= List of Jain temples =

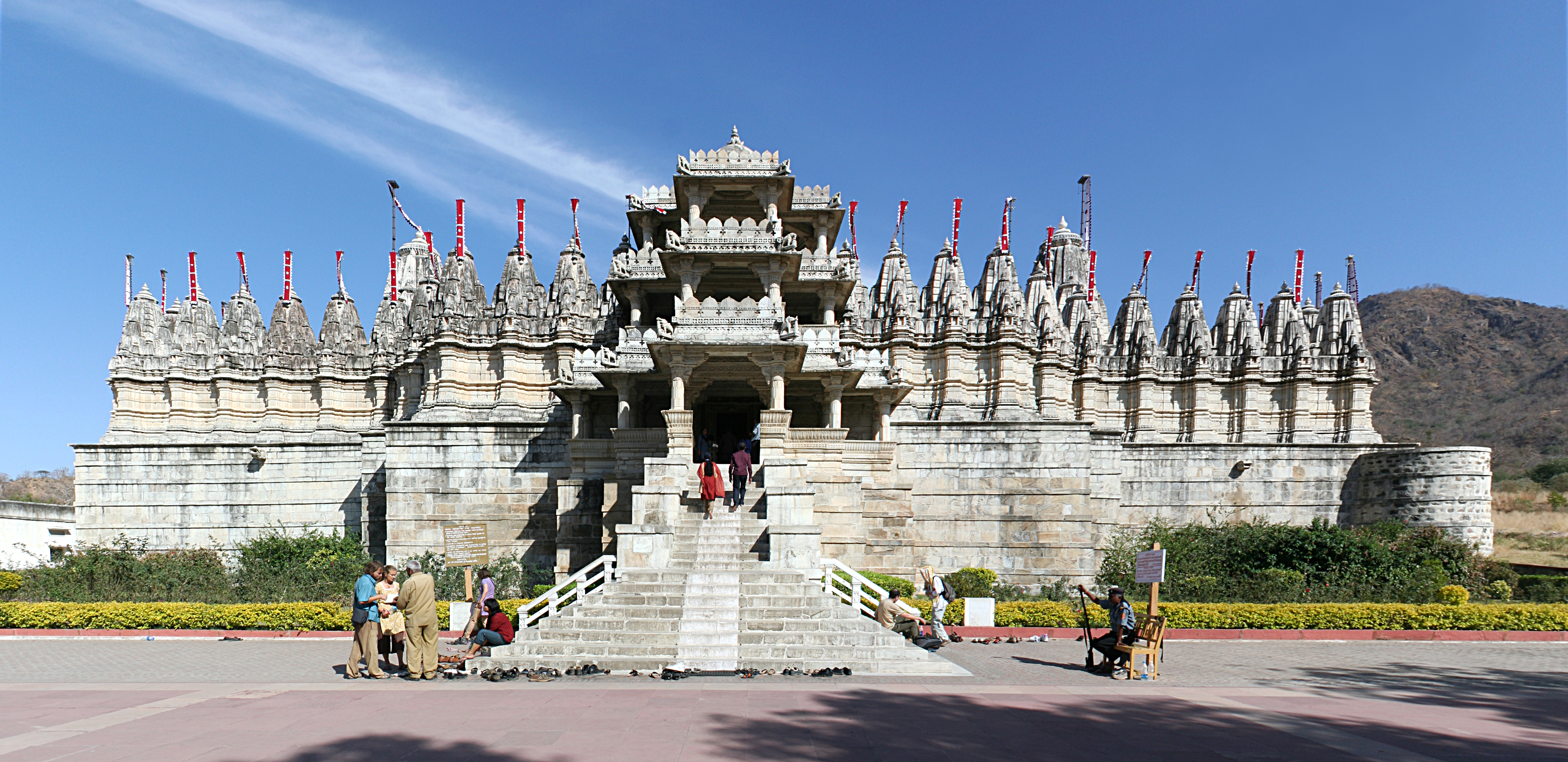
Ranakpur Jain temple in Ranakpur, Rajasthan

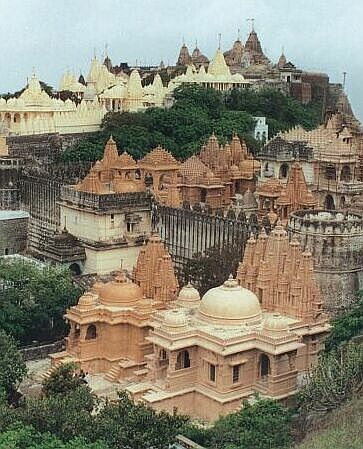
Palitana Tirtha

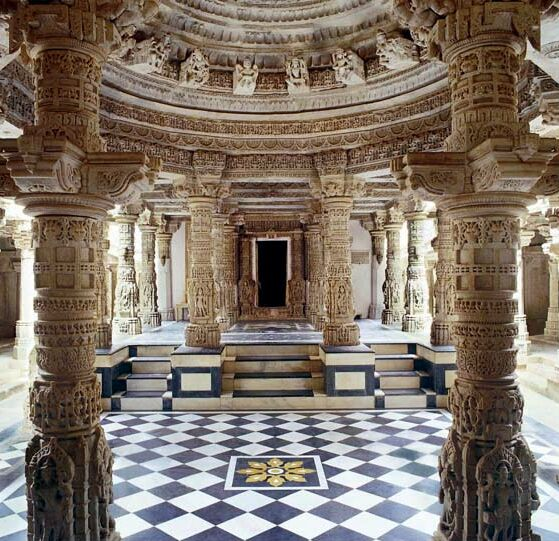
Dilwara Temples

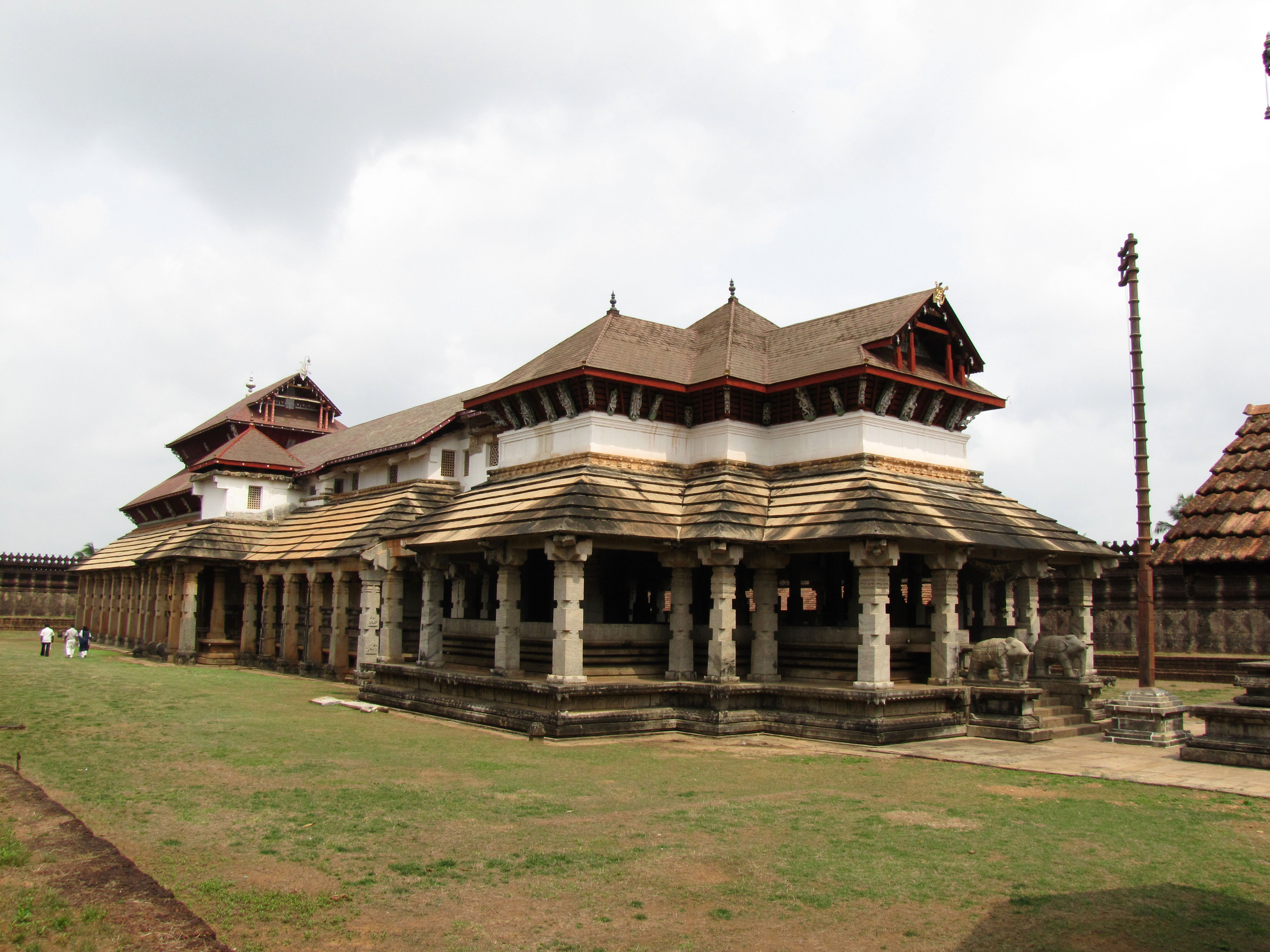
Saavira Kambada Basadi in Moodbidri

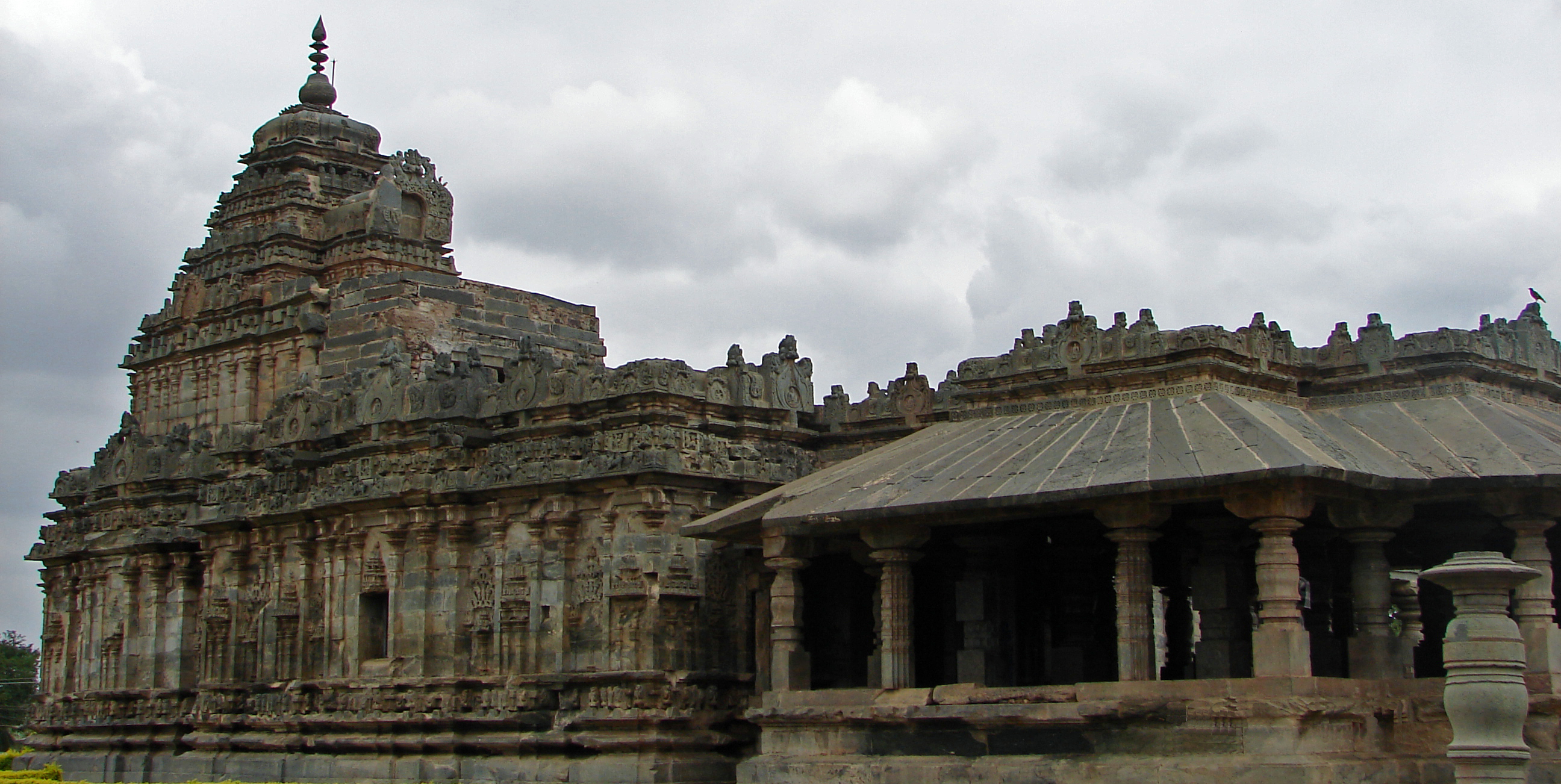
Brahma Jinalaya, Lakkundi

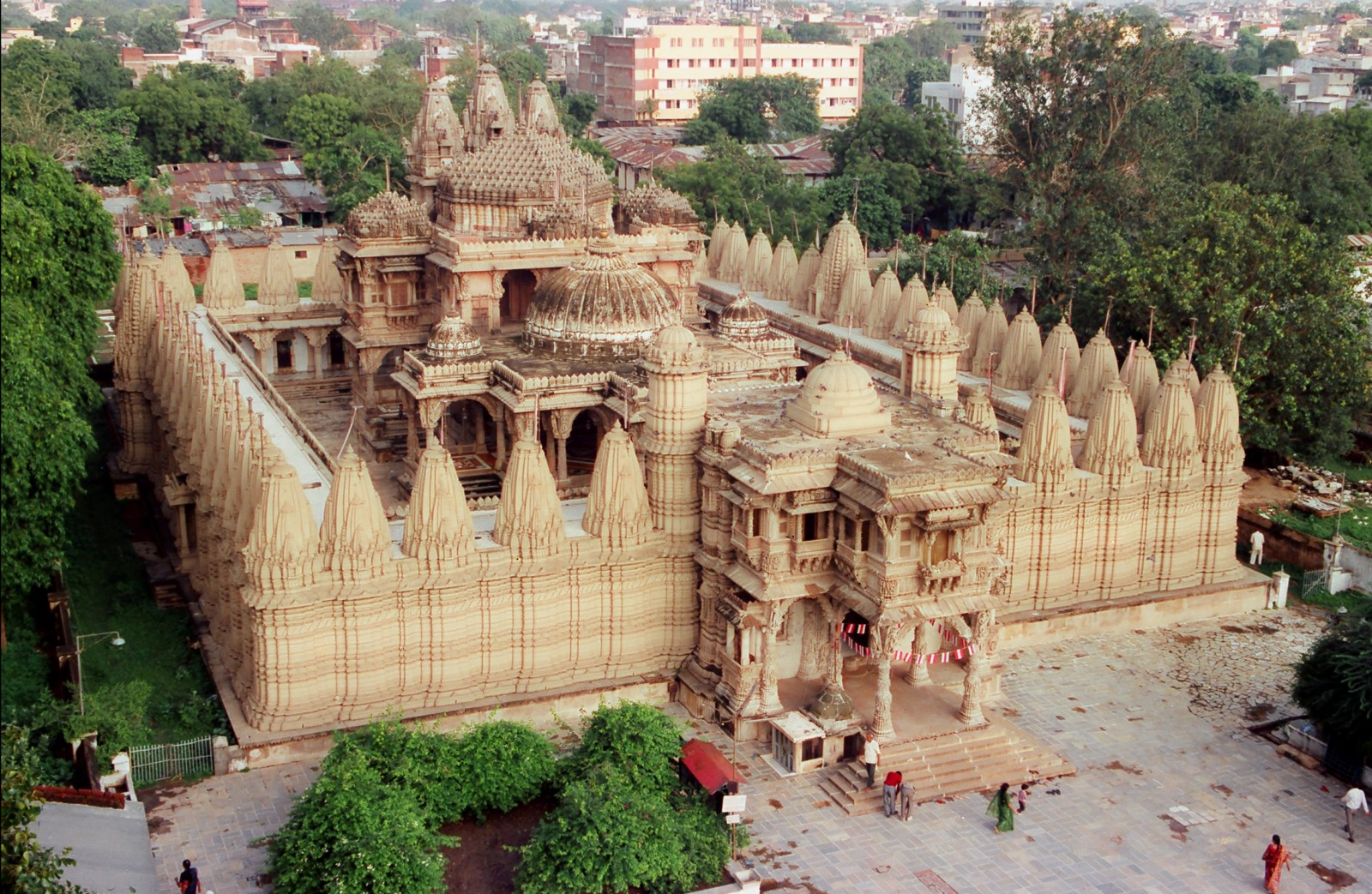
Hutheesing Jain Temple

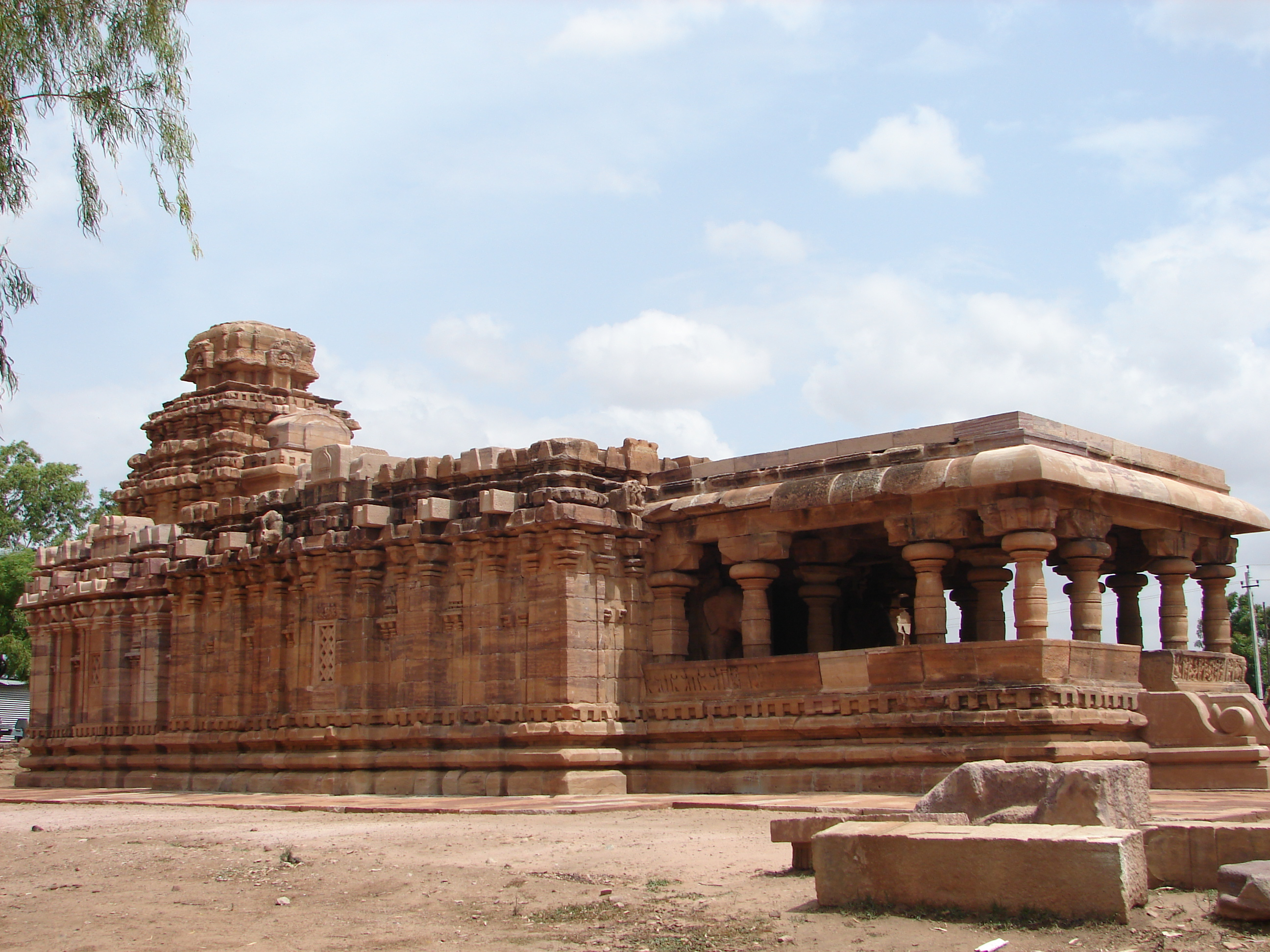
Jain Narayana temple: a UNESCO World Heritage Site

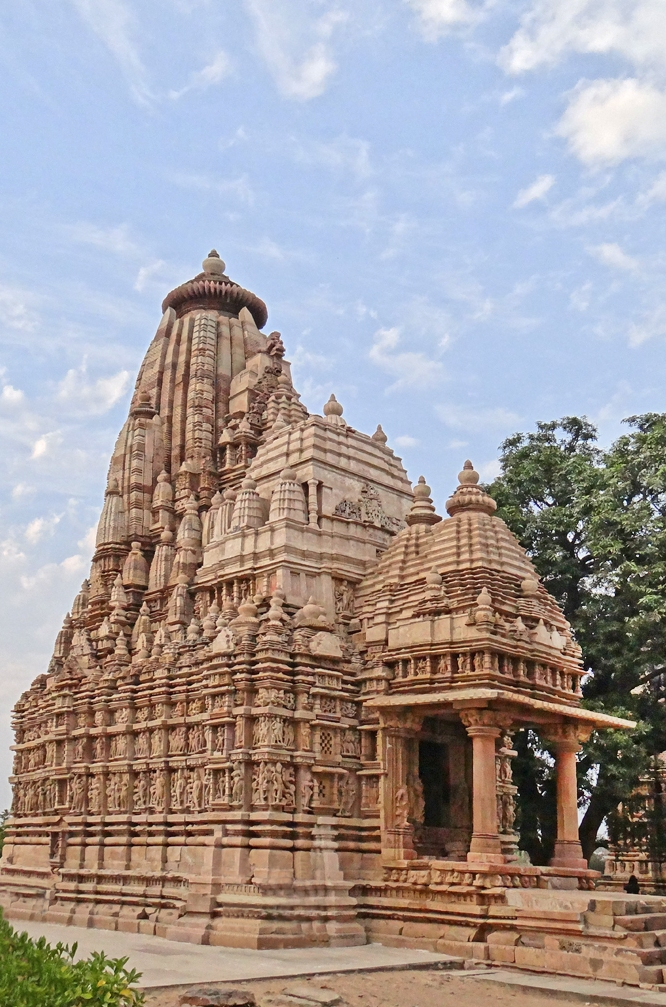
Parshvanatha temple, Khajuraho: a UNESCO World Heritage Site

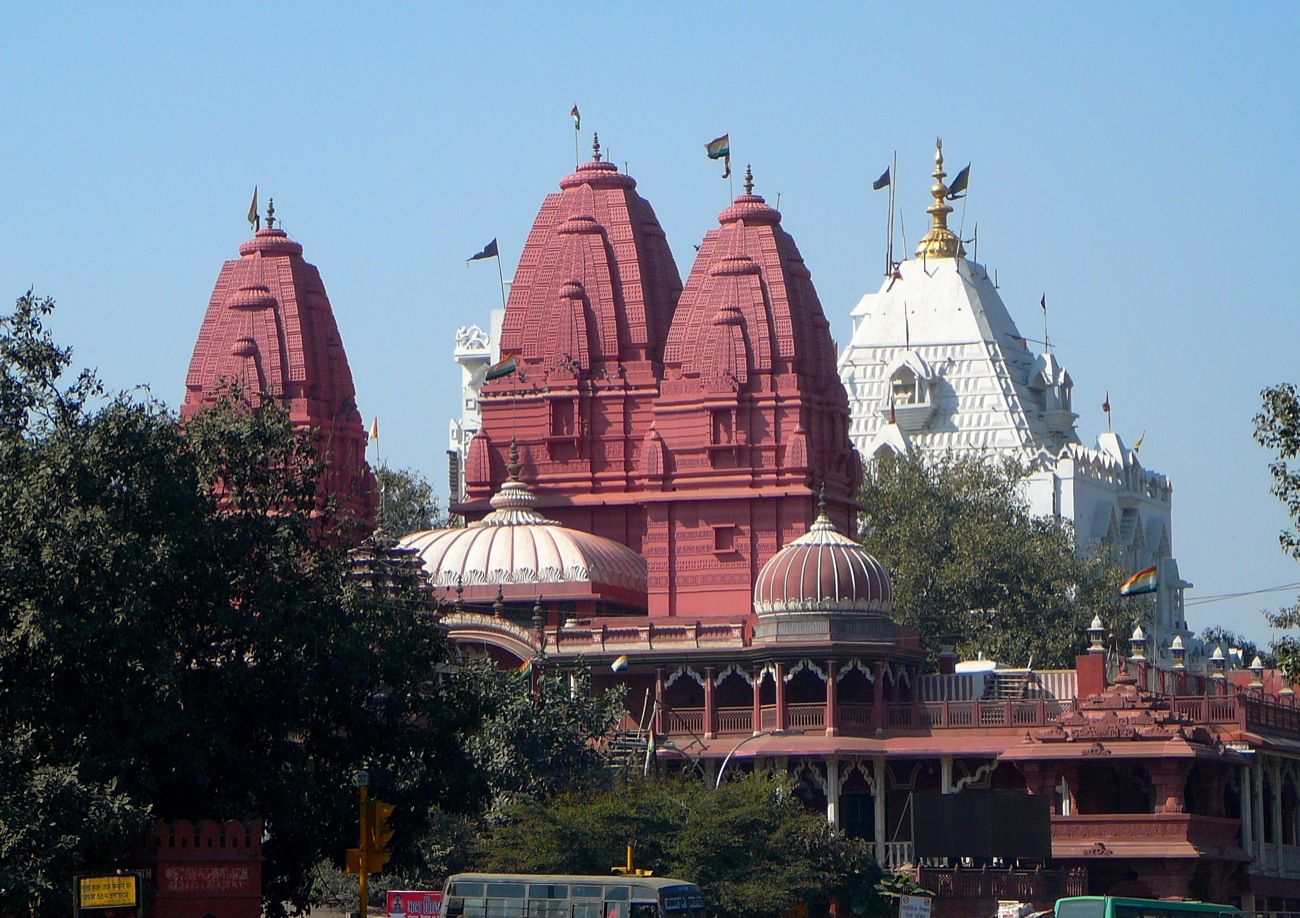
Lal Mandir in Delhi

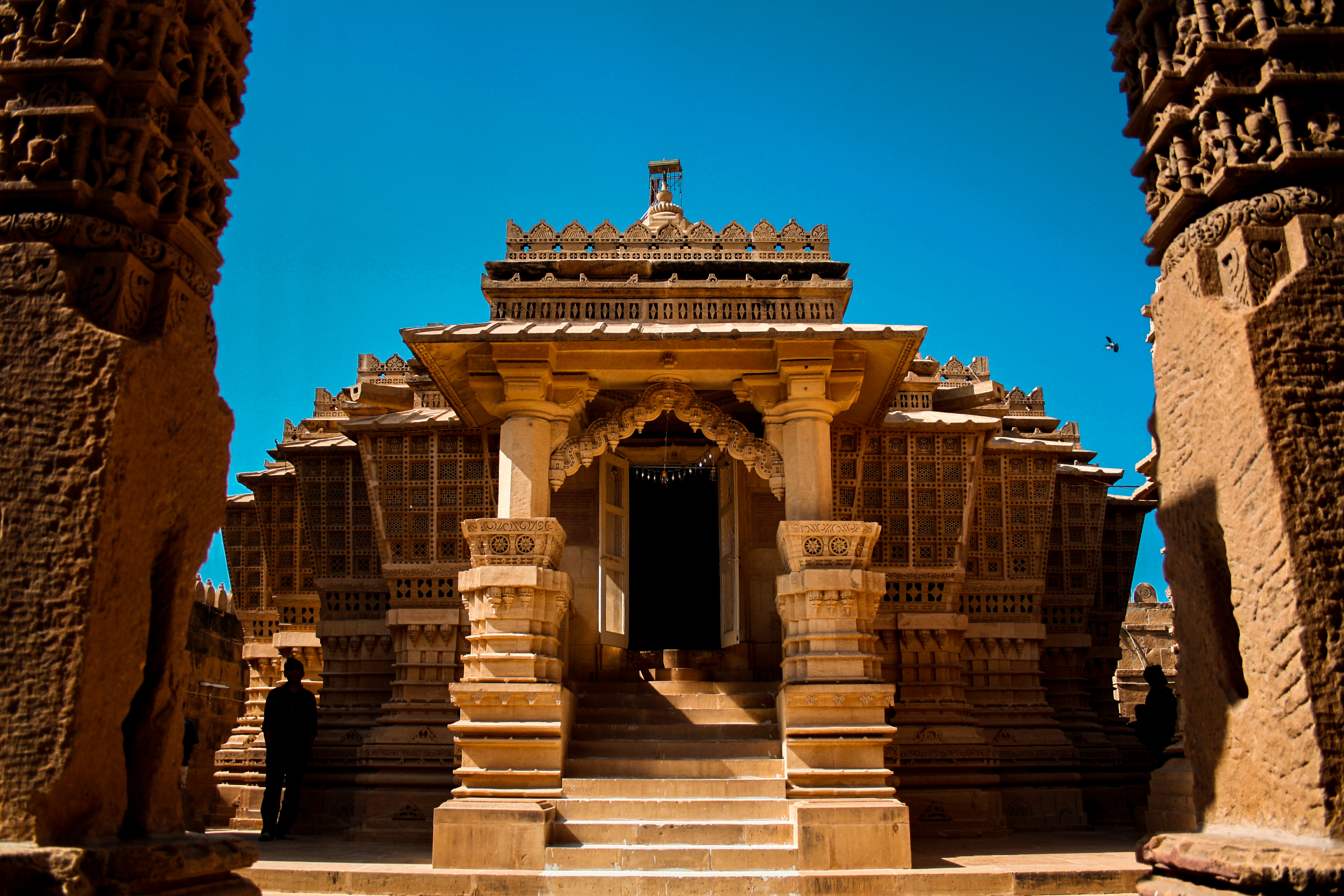
Lodhurva Jain temple

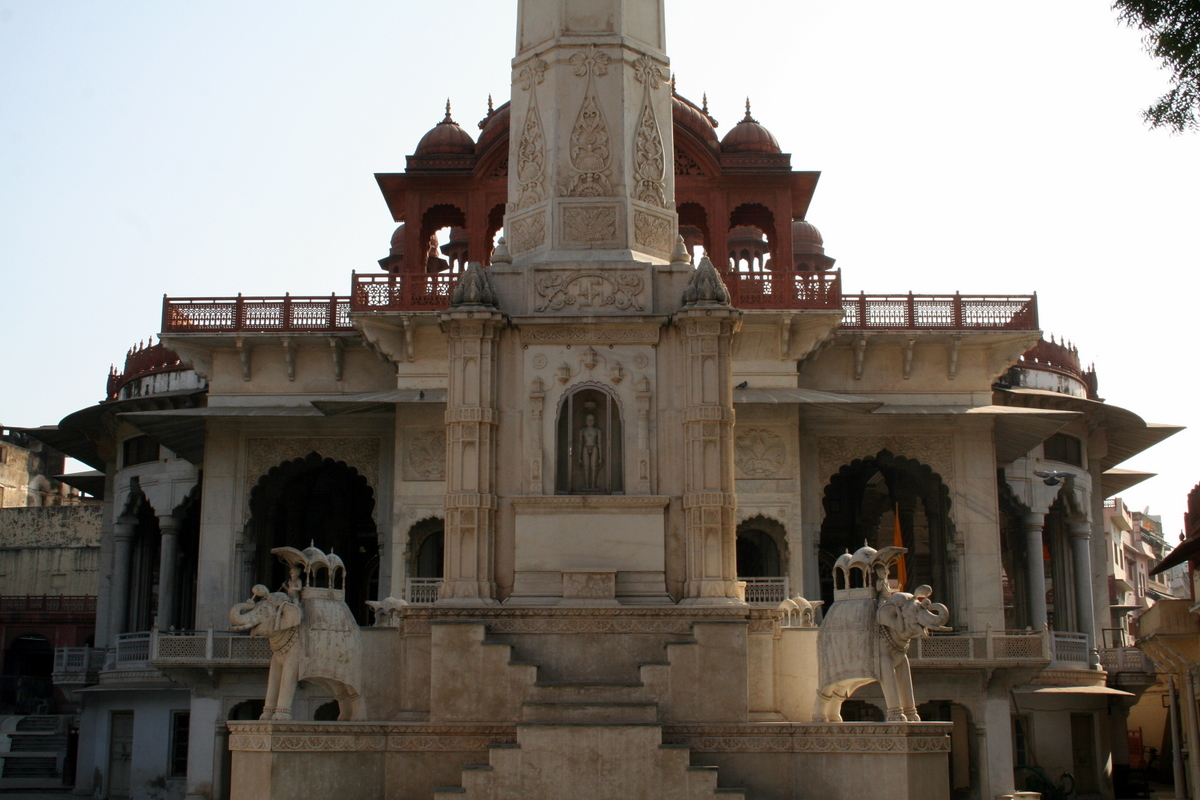
Soniji Ki Nasiyan

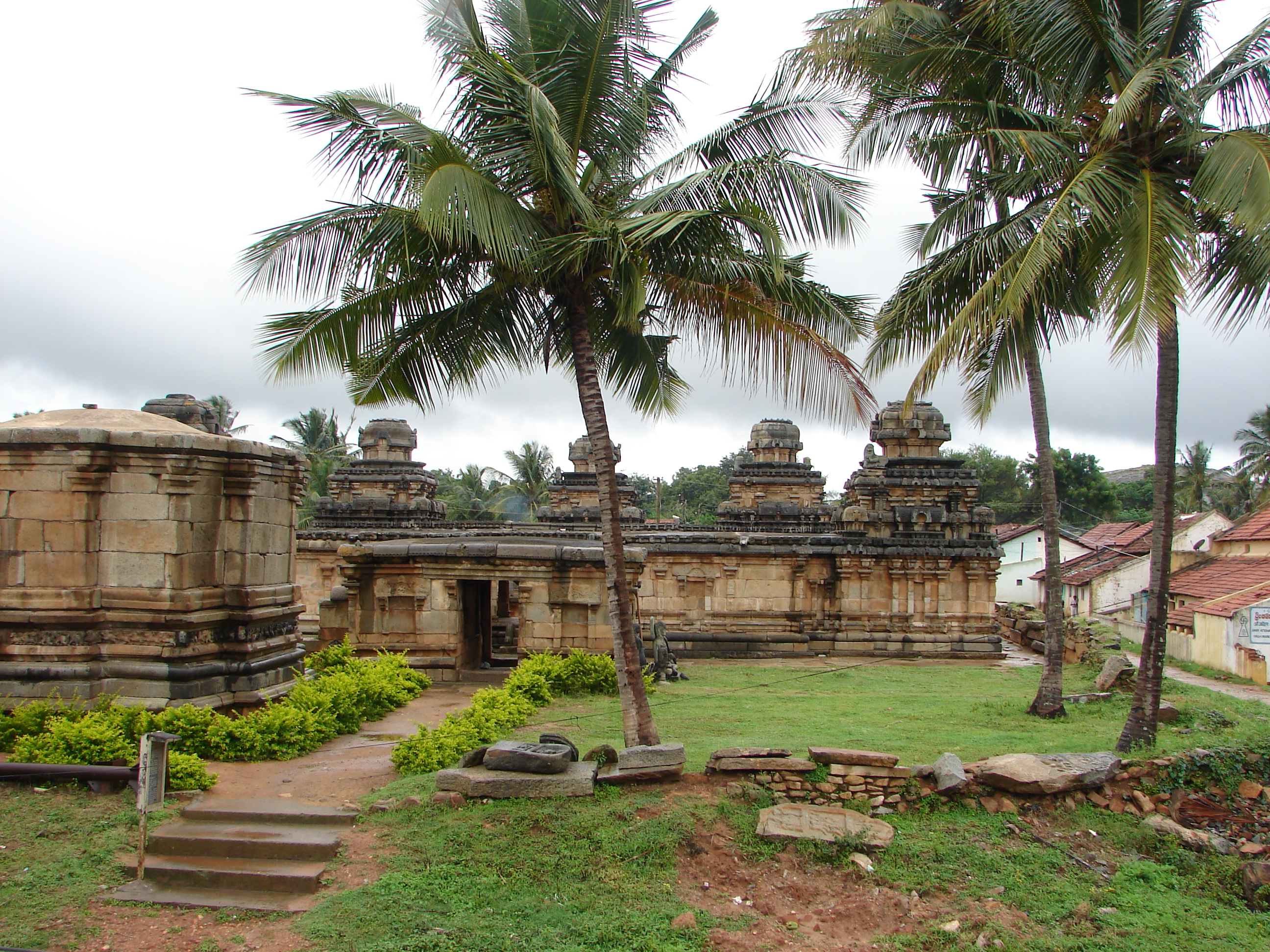
Panchakuta Basadi, Mandya

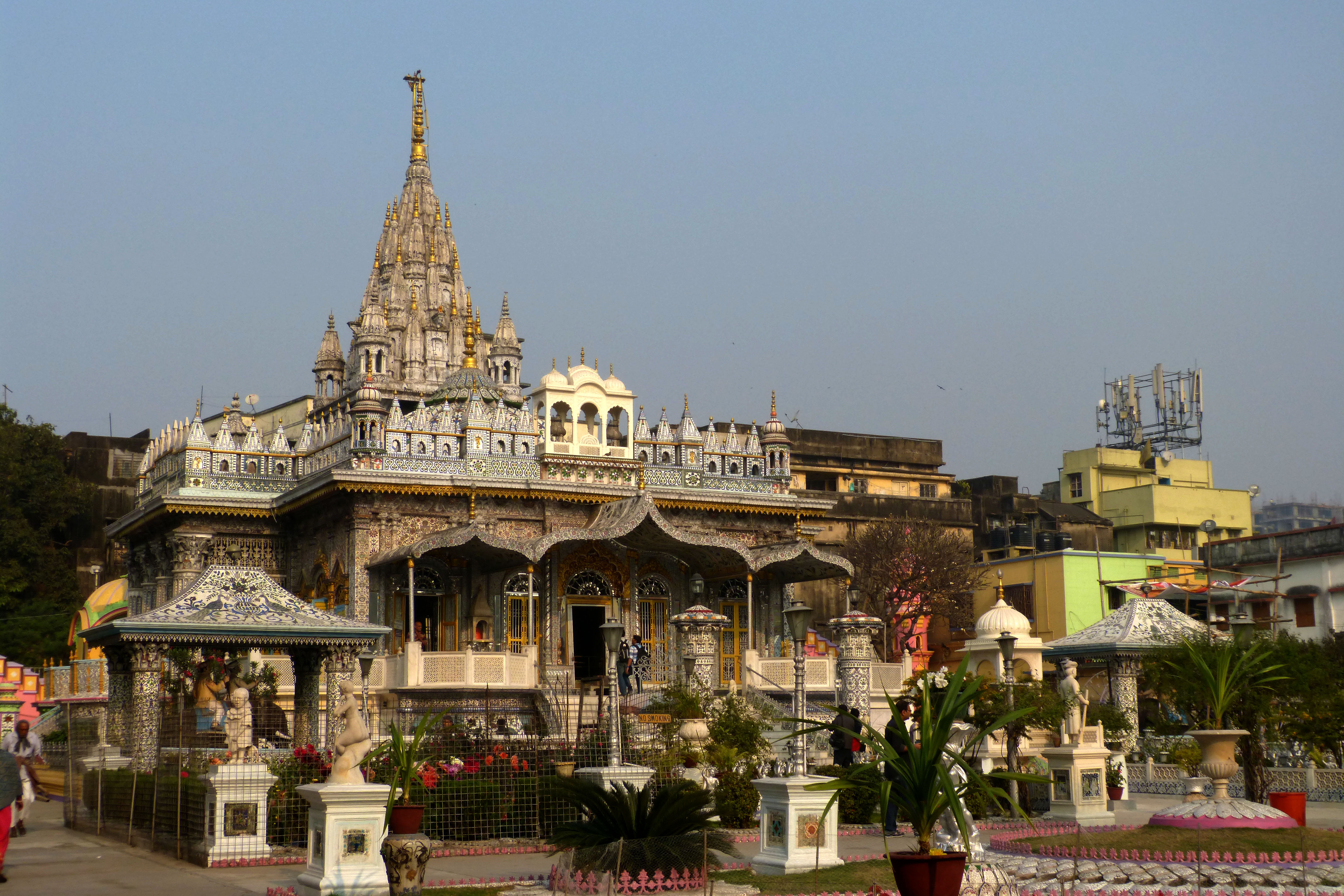
Parshwanath Temple, Calcutta

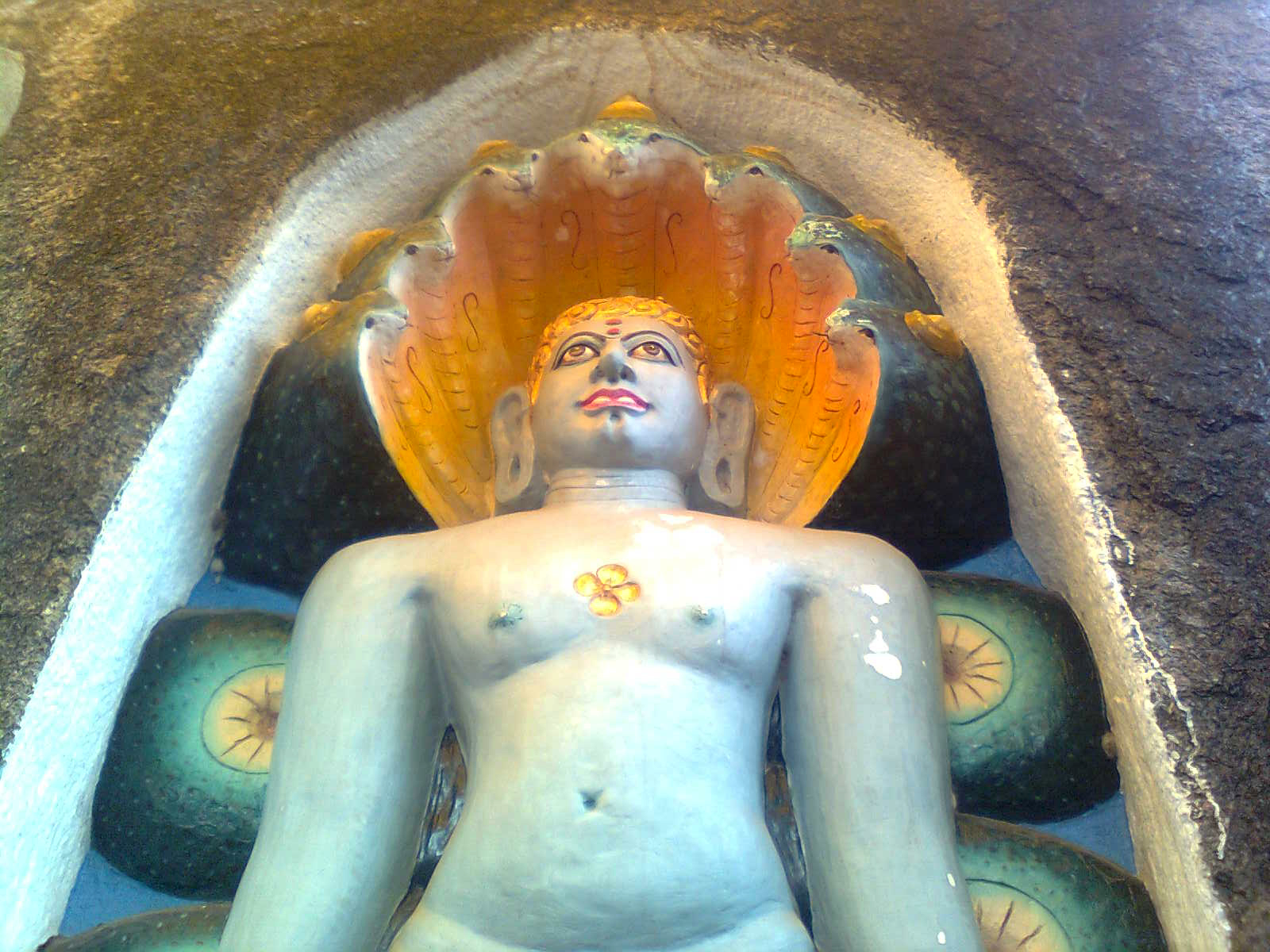
Jain Tirthankara Relief at Padmakshi Gutta, Warangal

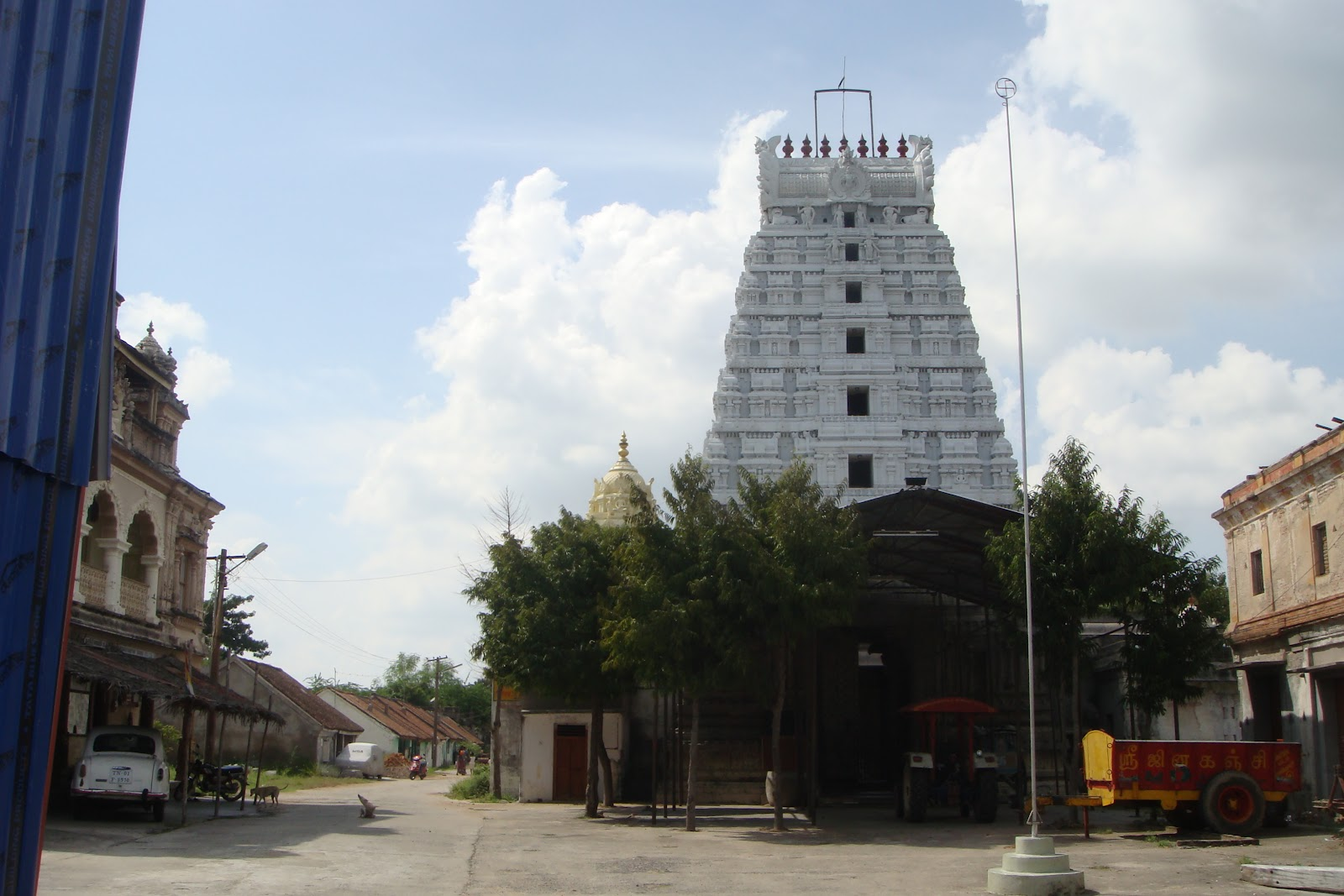
Mel Sithamur Jain Math

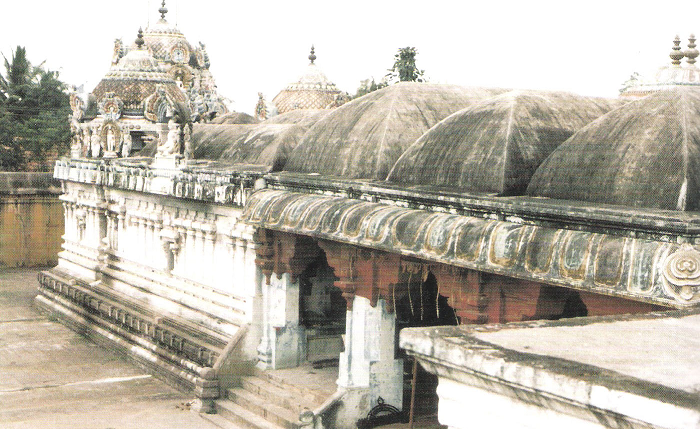
Mannargudi Mallinatha Swamy Jain Temple

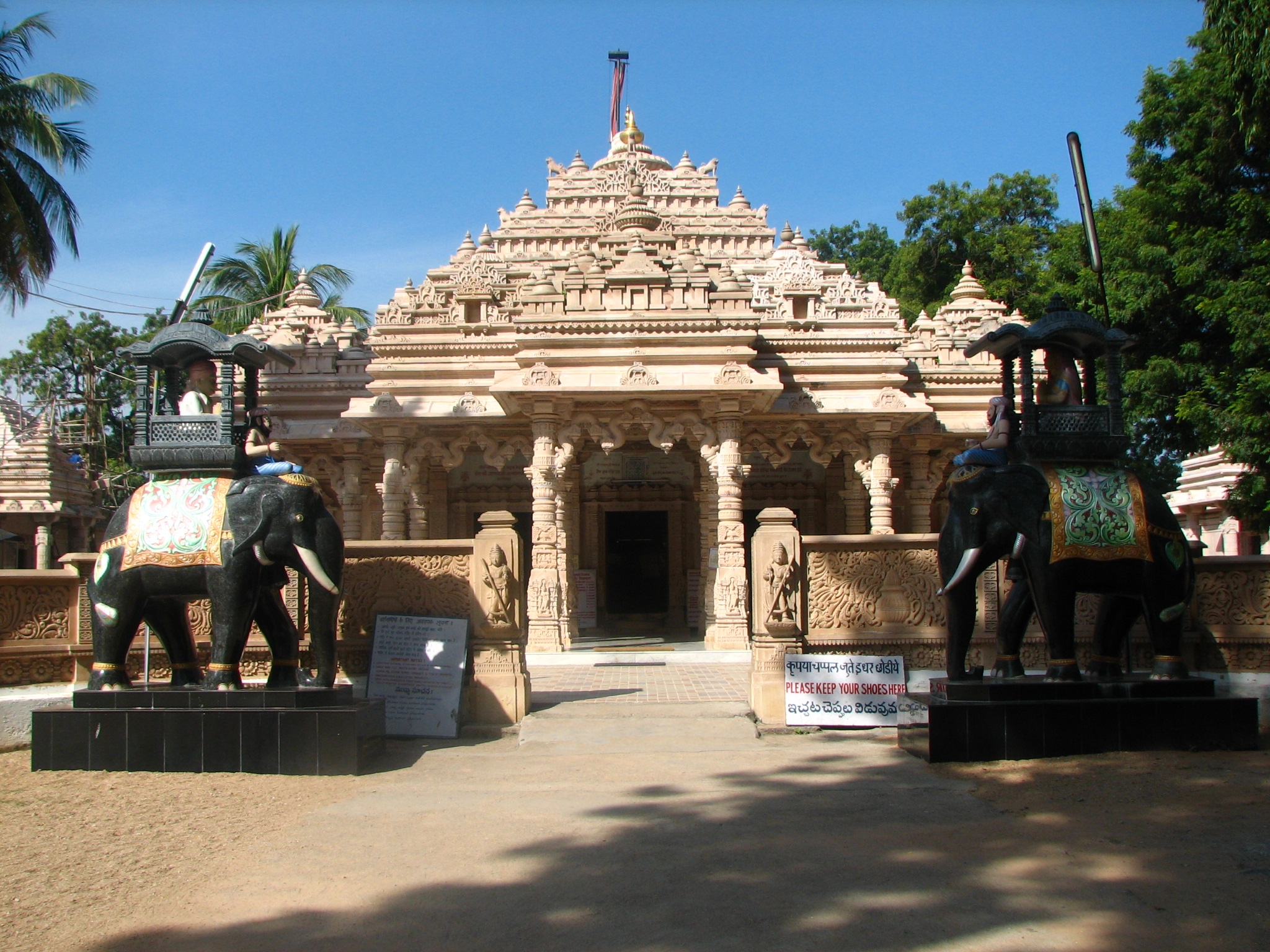
Kulpakji

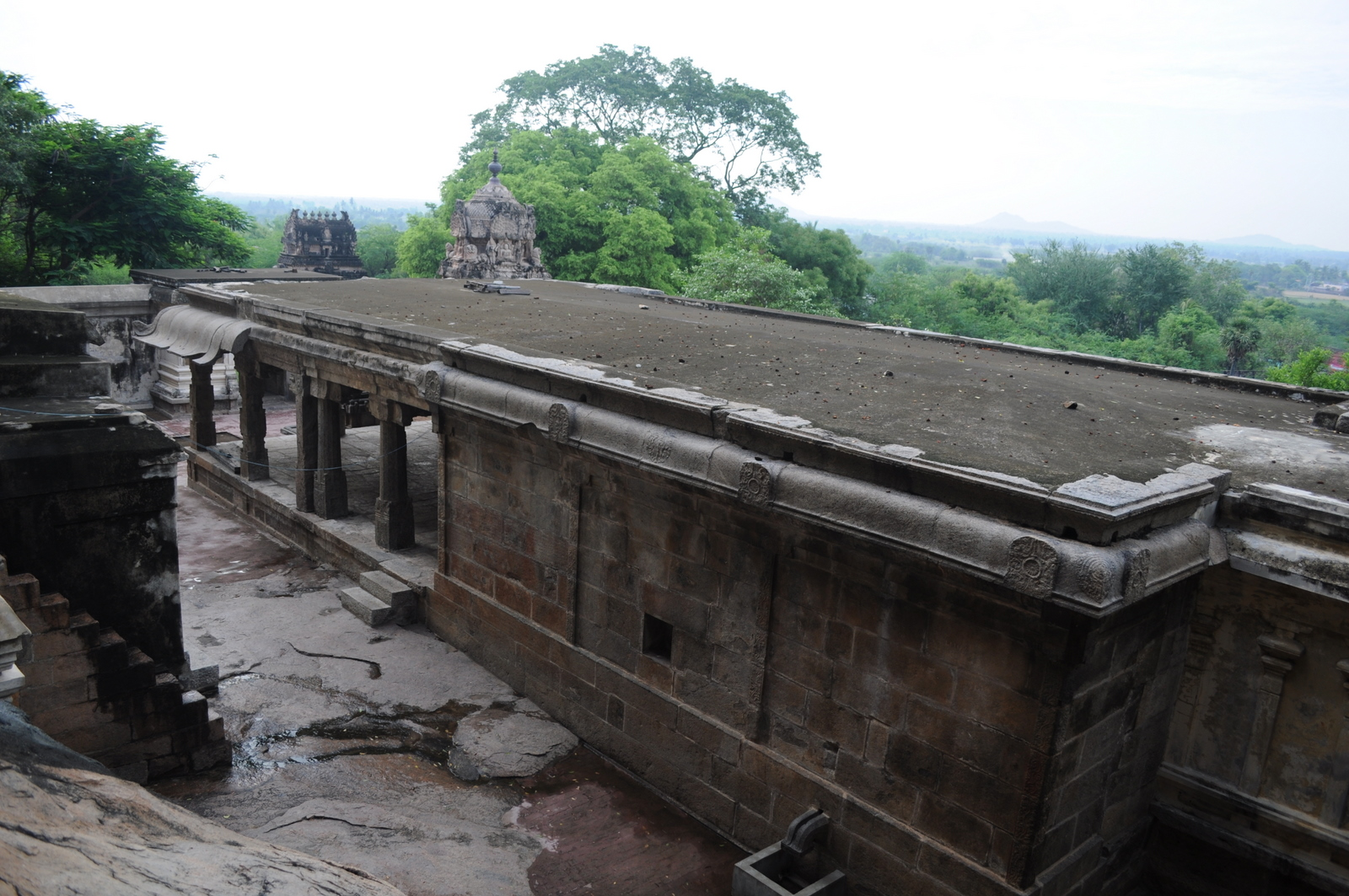
Arahanthgiri Jain Math

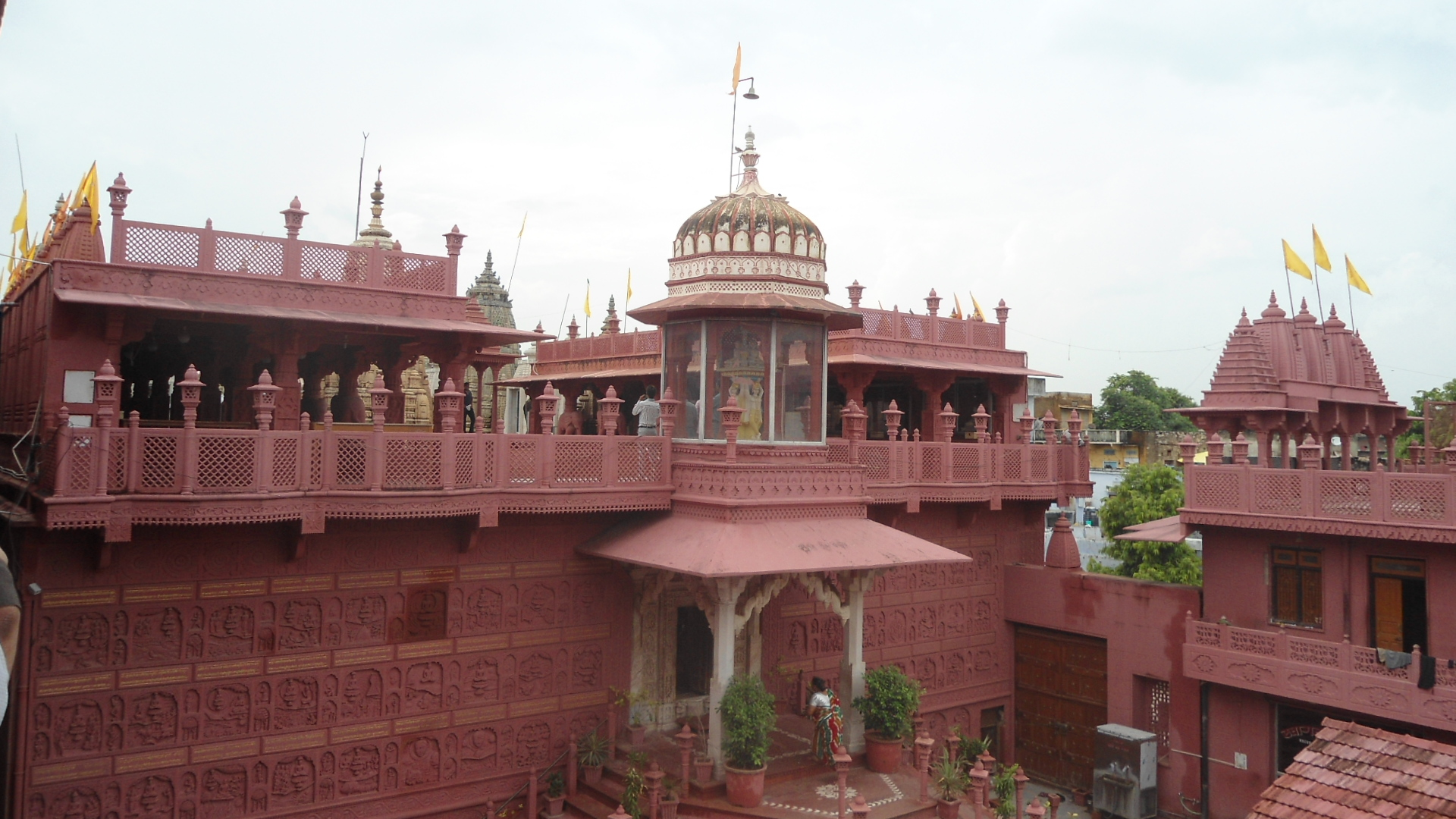
Sanghiji, Sanganer

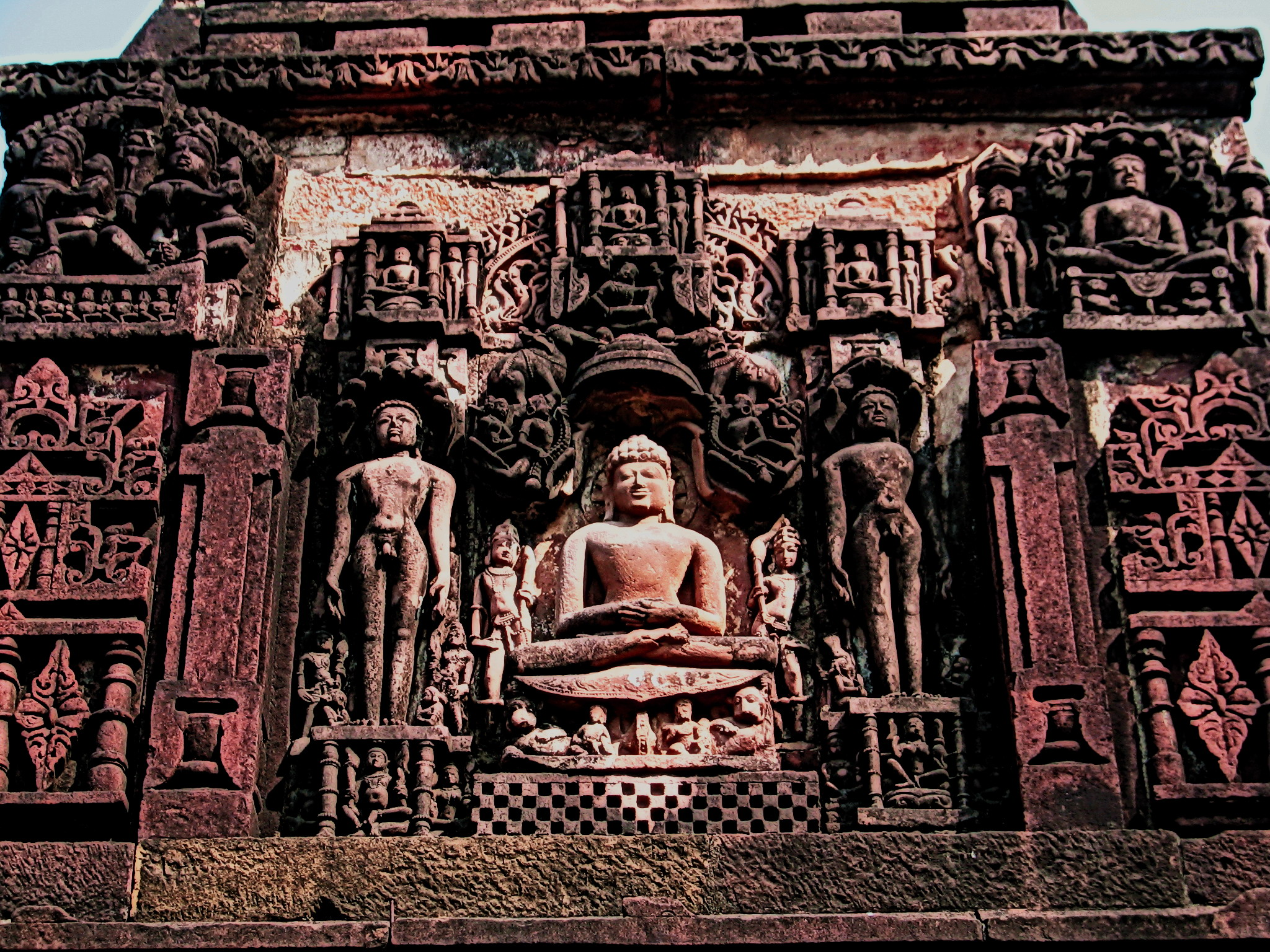
Shantinath Temple, Deogarh

Jain temples and tirtha (pilgrimage sites) are present throughout the Indian subcontinent, many of which were built several hundred years ago. Many of these temples are classified according to Jain sects. Idols of tirthankaras are present in these temples. Many Jain temples are found in other areas of the world. This article lists and documents prominent Jain temples and Tirthas around the world.

== India ==
=== Andhra Pradesh ===
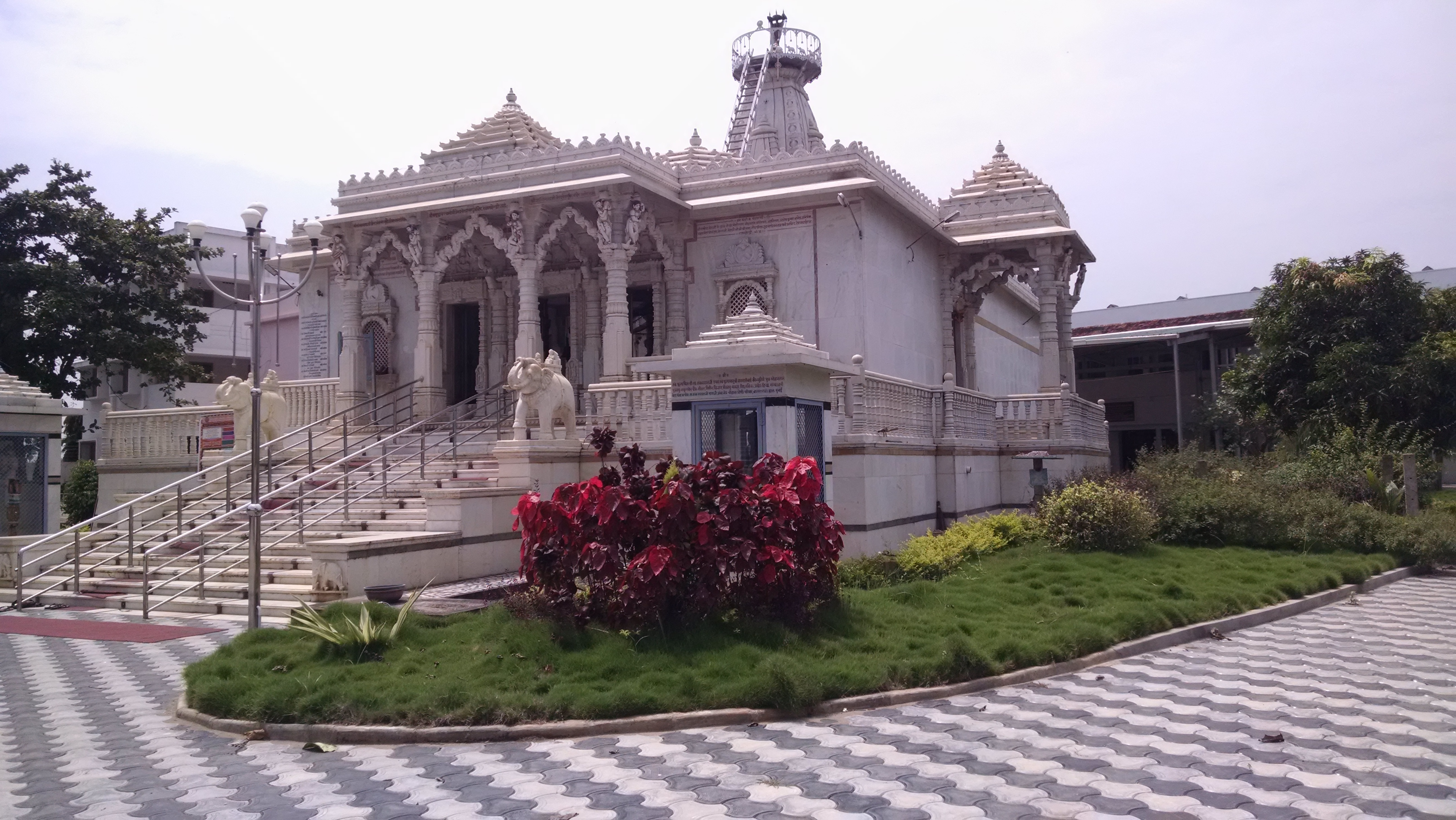
Shree Shankheshwar Parshwanath Jain Temple

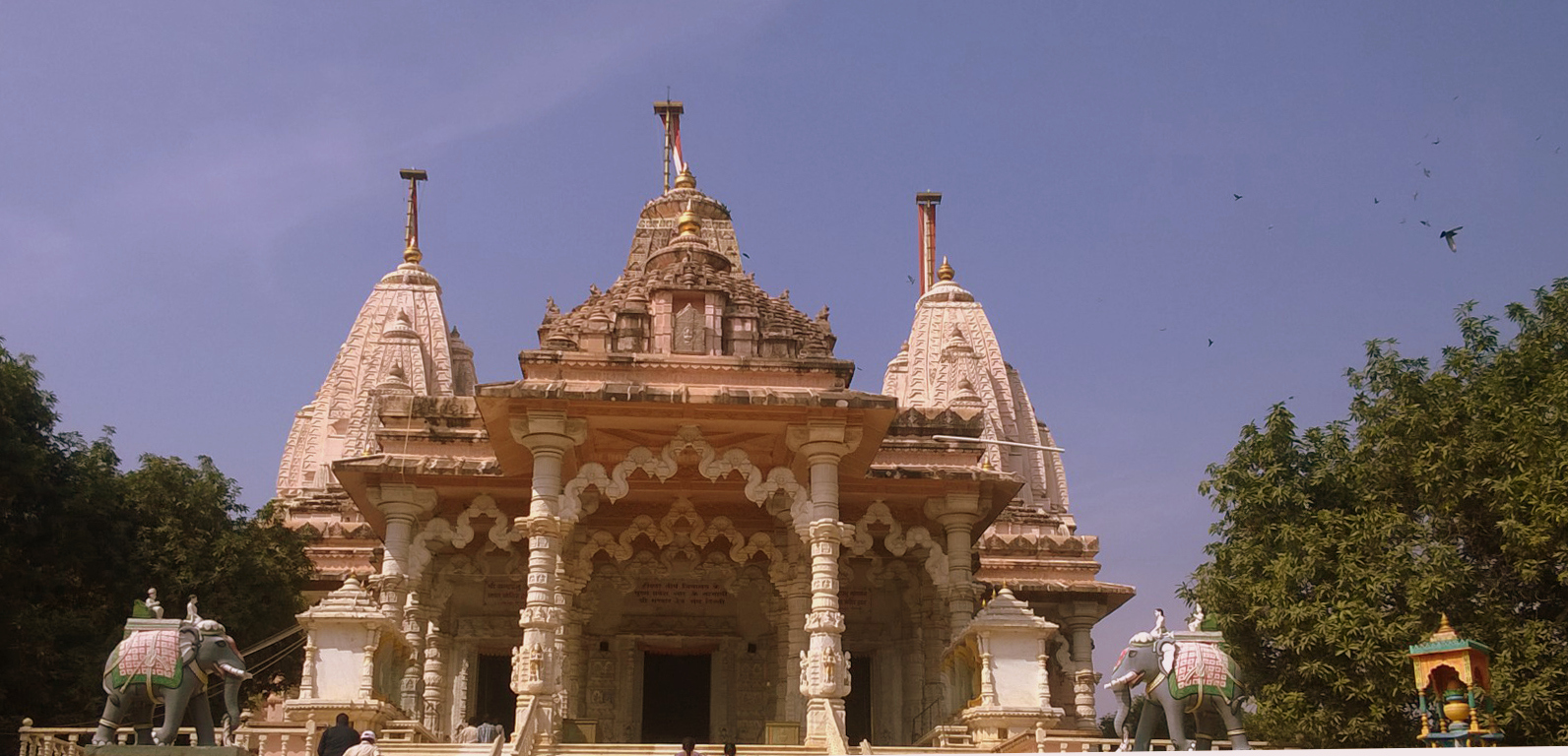
Hrinkar Teerth

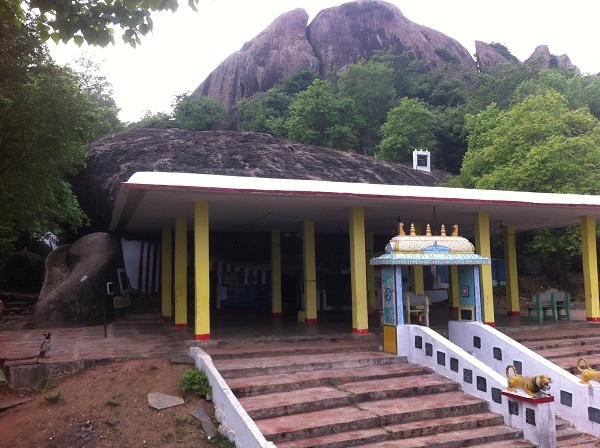
Siddalakona cave temple

Cave temples

- Undavalli Caves
- Ambapuram cave temple
- Bodhikonda and Ghanikonda Caves
- Siddalakona

Main temples

- Danavulapadu Jain temple
- Shree Shankheshwar Parshwanath Jain temple in Gummileru
- Hrinkar Teerth near NH 5, Namburu.

=== Assam ===
- Jain Temple in Tihu, Tihu
- Sri Surya Pahar

=== Bihar ===
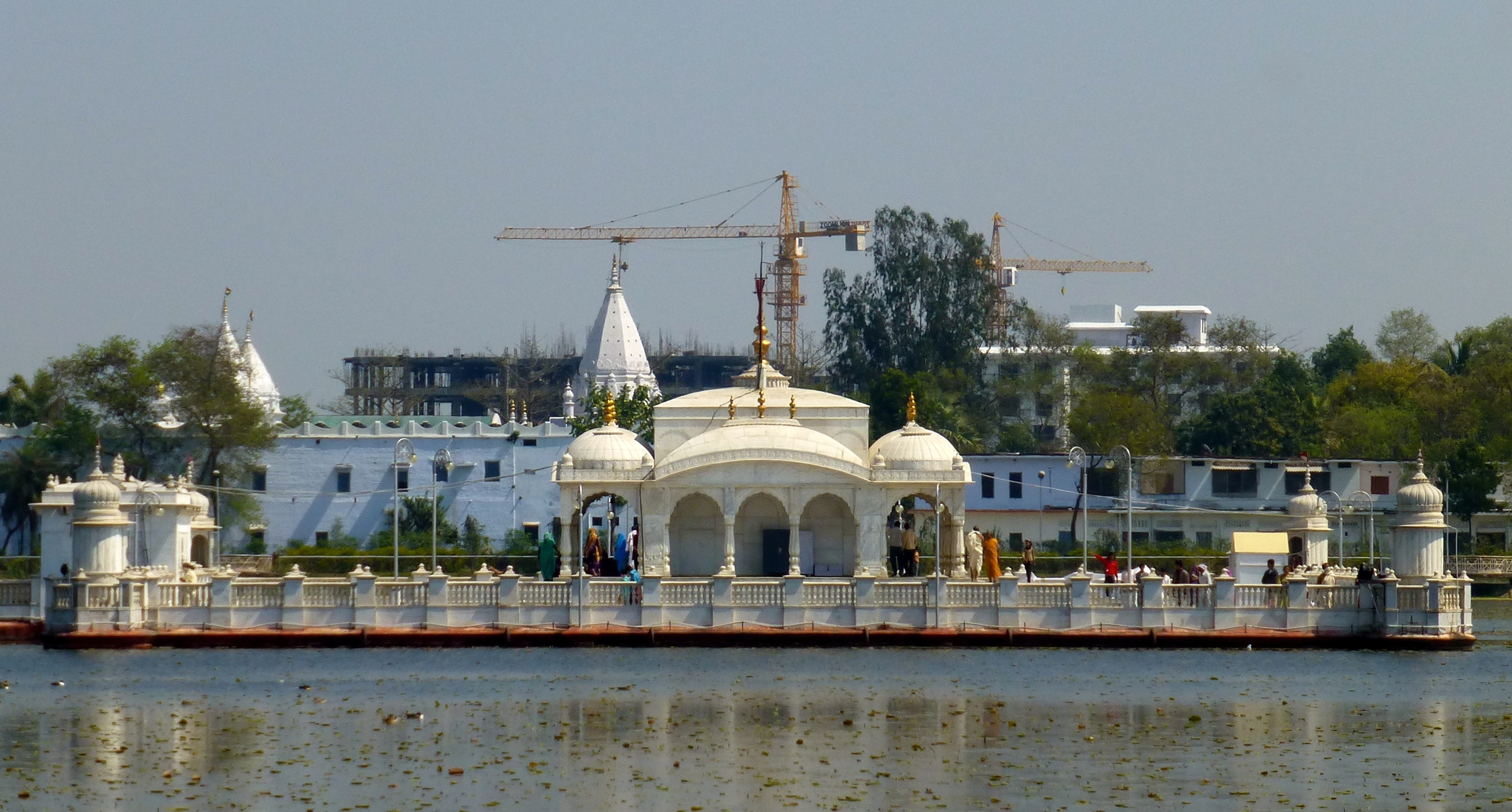
Jal Mandir, Pawapuri

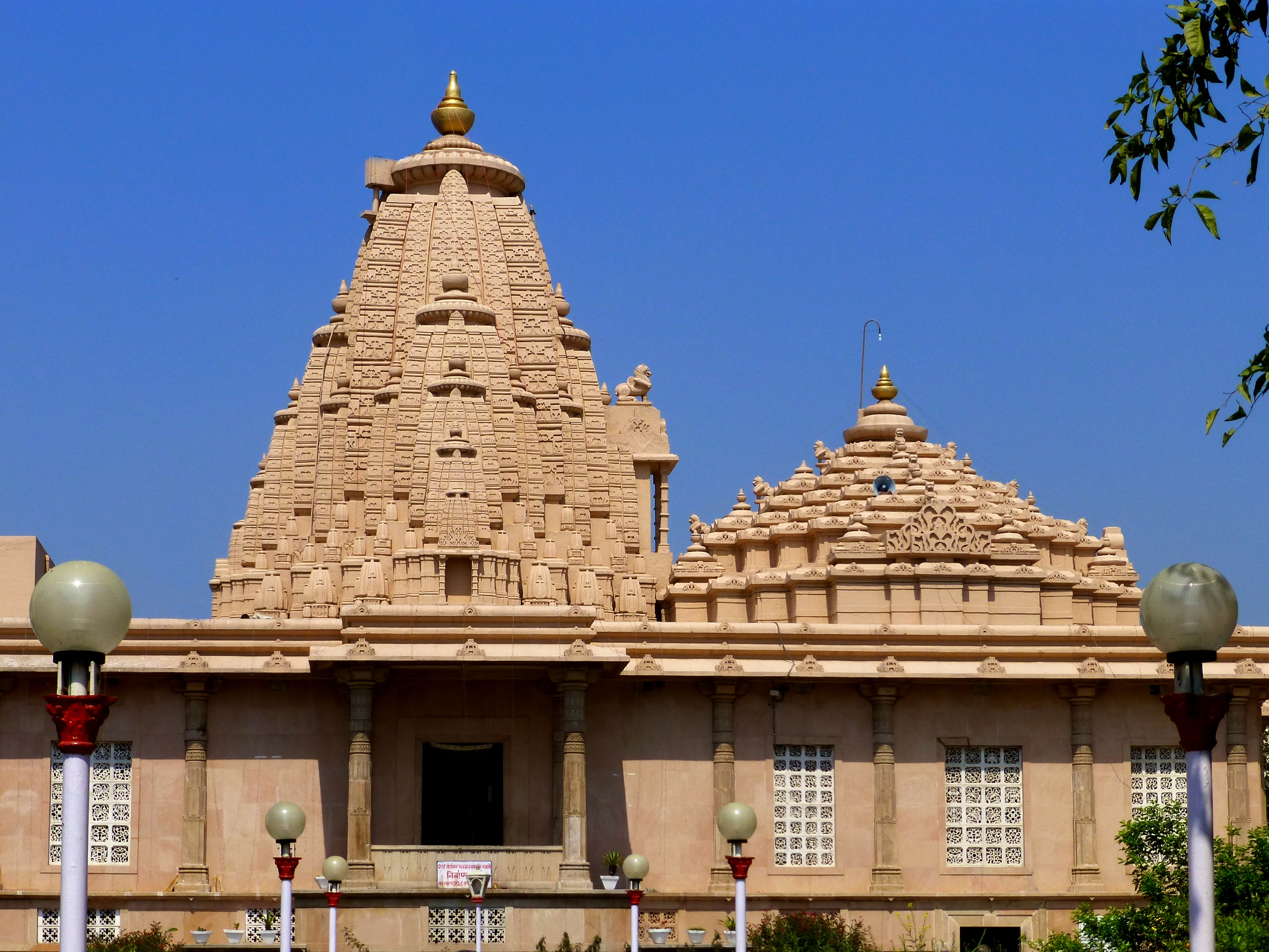
Gaon mandir, Pawapuri

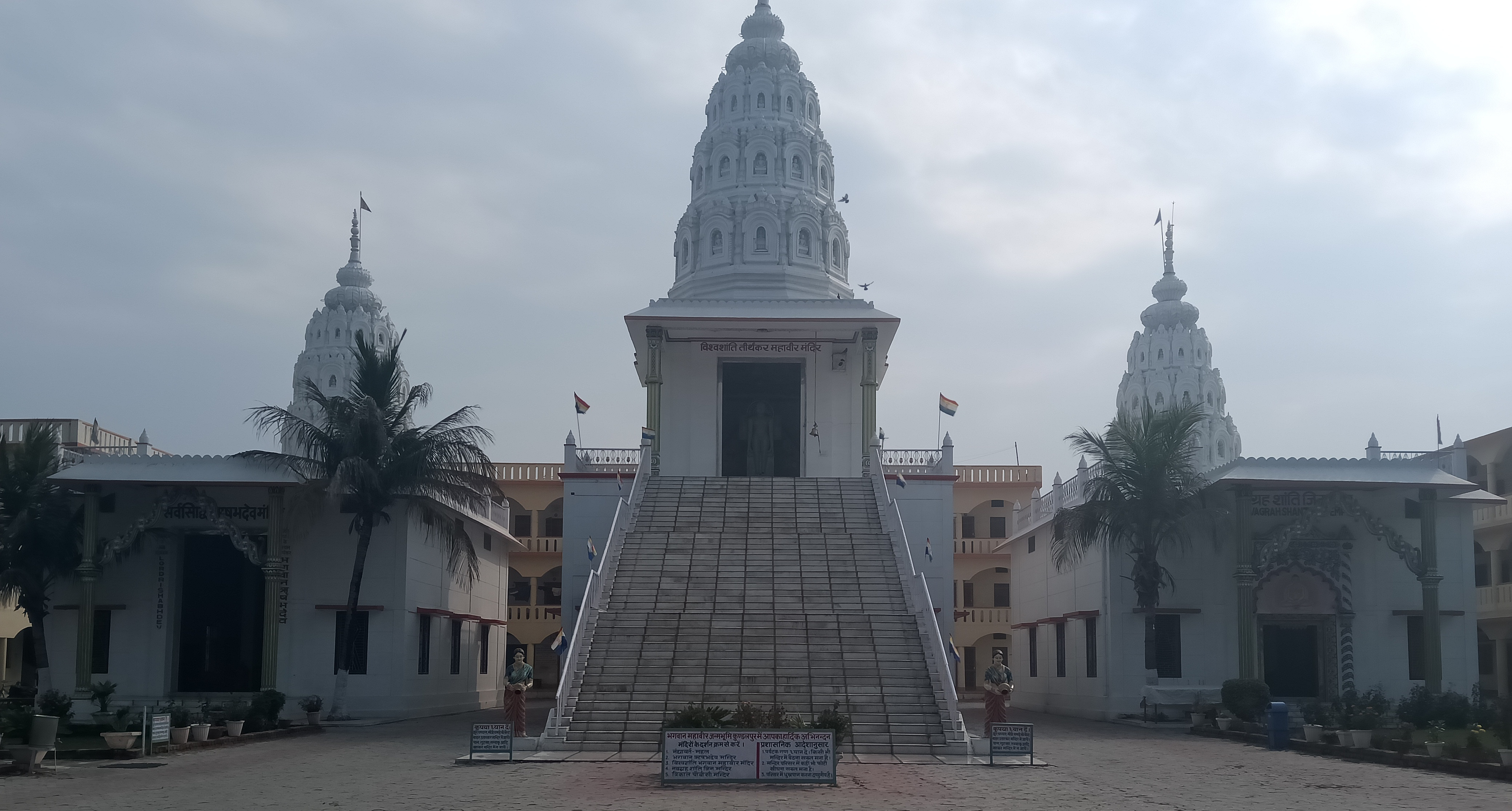
Jain temple, Kundalpur, Bihar

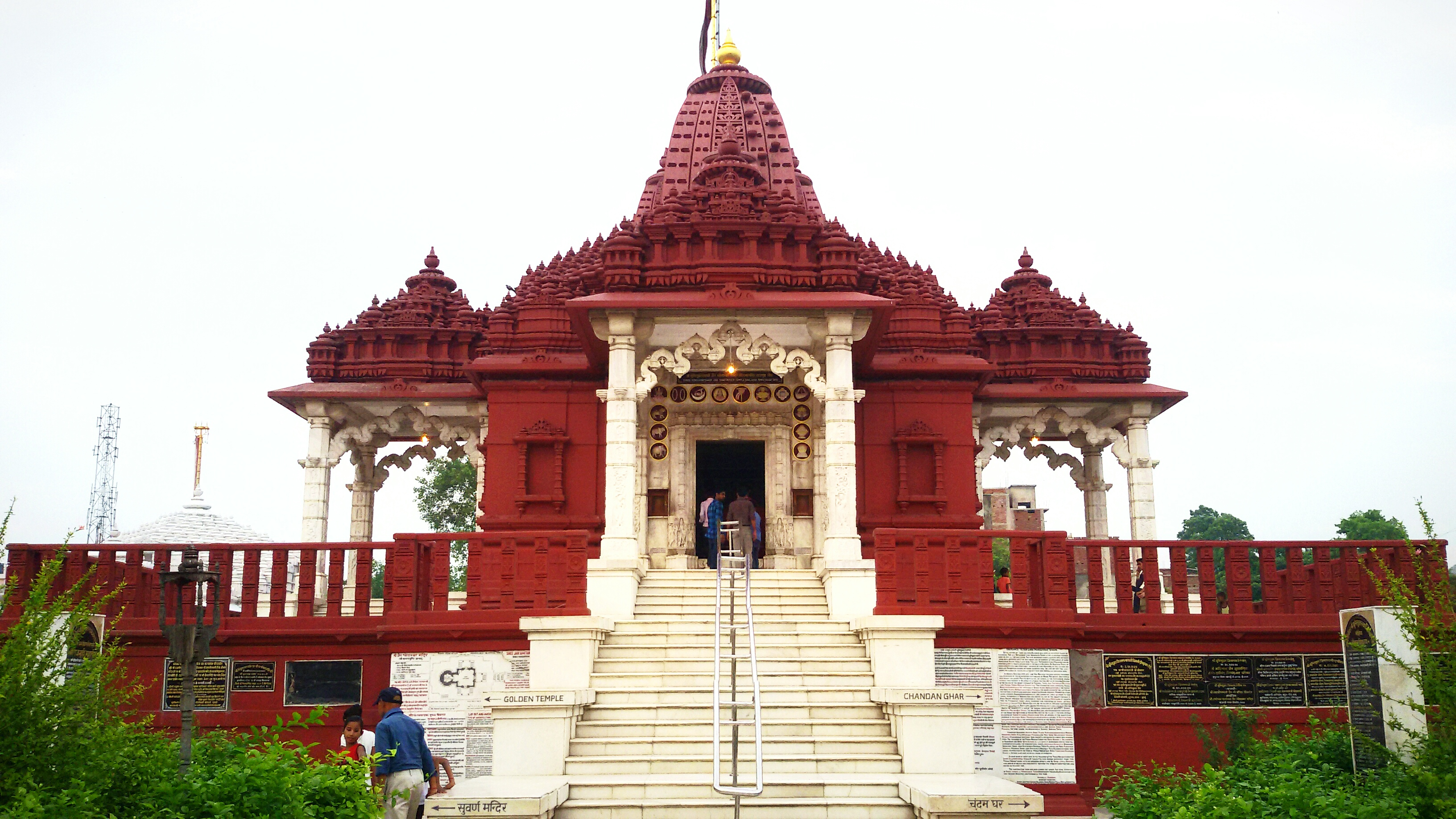
Naulakha Mandir, Rajgir

Cave temple

- Son Bhandar Caves

Main temple

- Jain temples, Rajgir
- Jal Mandir, Pawapuri
- Champapuri
- Lachhuar Jain temple, Jamui district
- Kamaldah Jain temple in Pataliputra
- Vikramashila
- Jain temple, Kundalpur
- Mandargiri, Bihar
- Arrah – 44 Jain temples including Parashanatha Temple, Arrah
- Mithilapuri Jain Teerth

=== Chhattisgarh ===
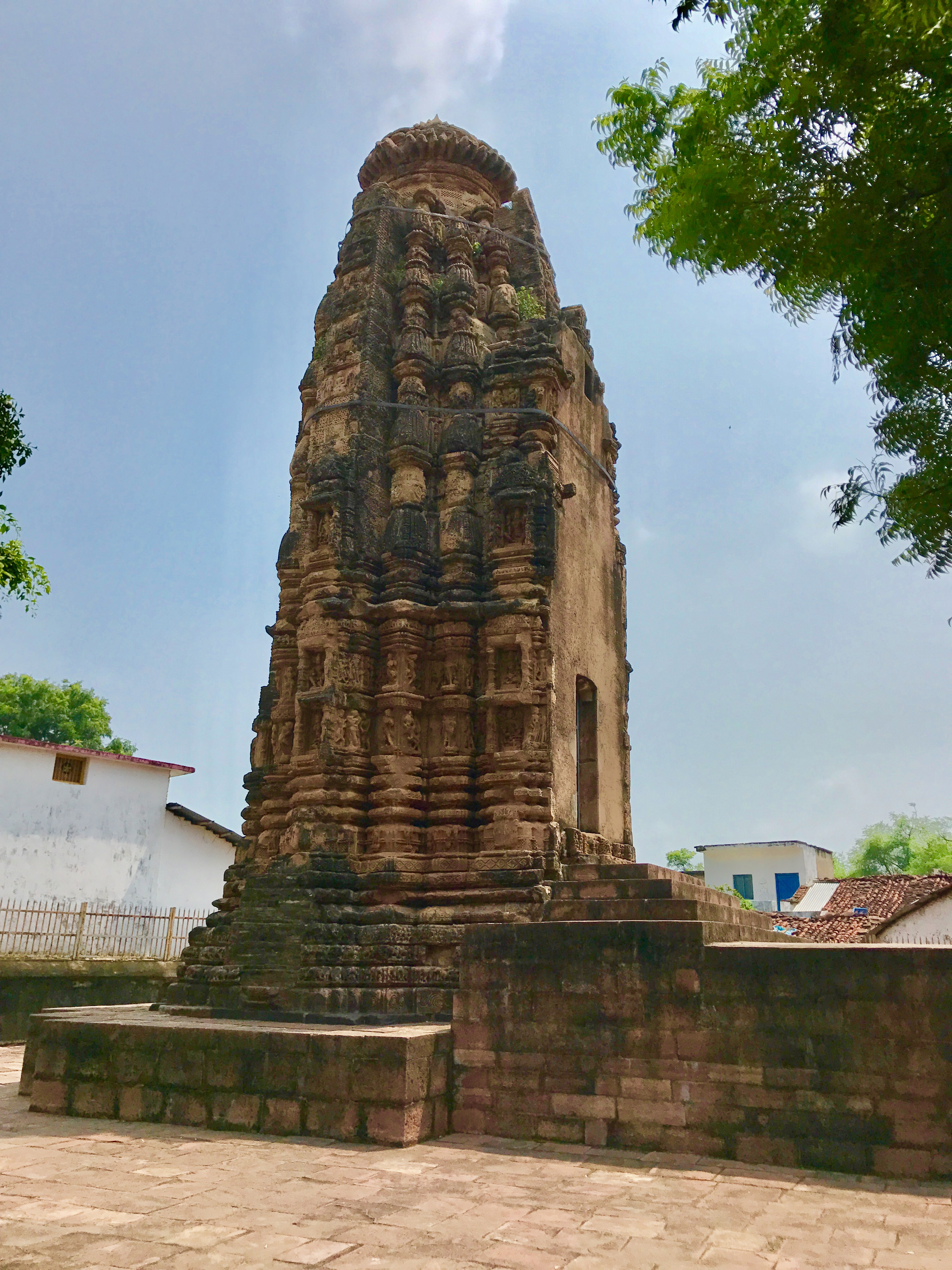
Terracota Bhand Dewal temple, Arang

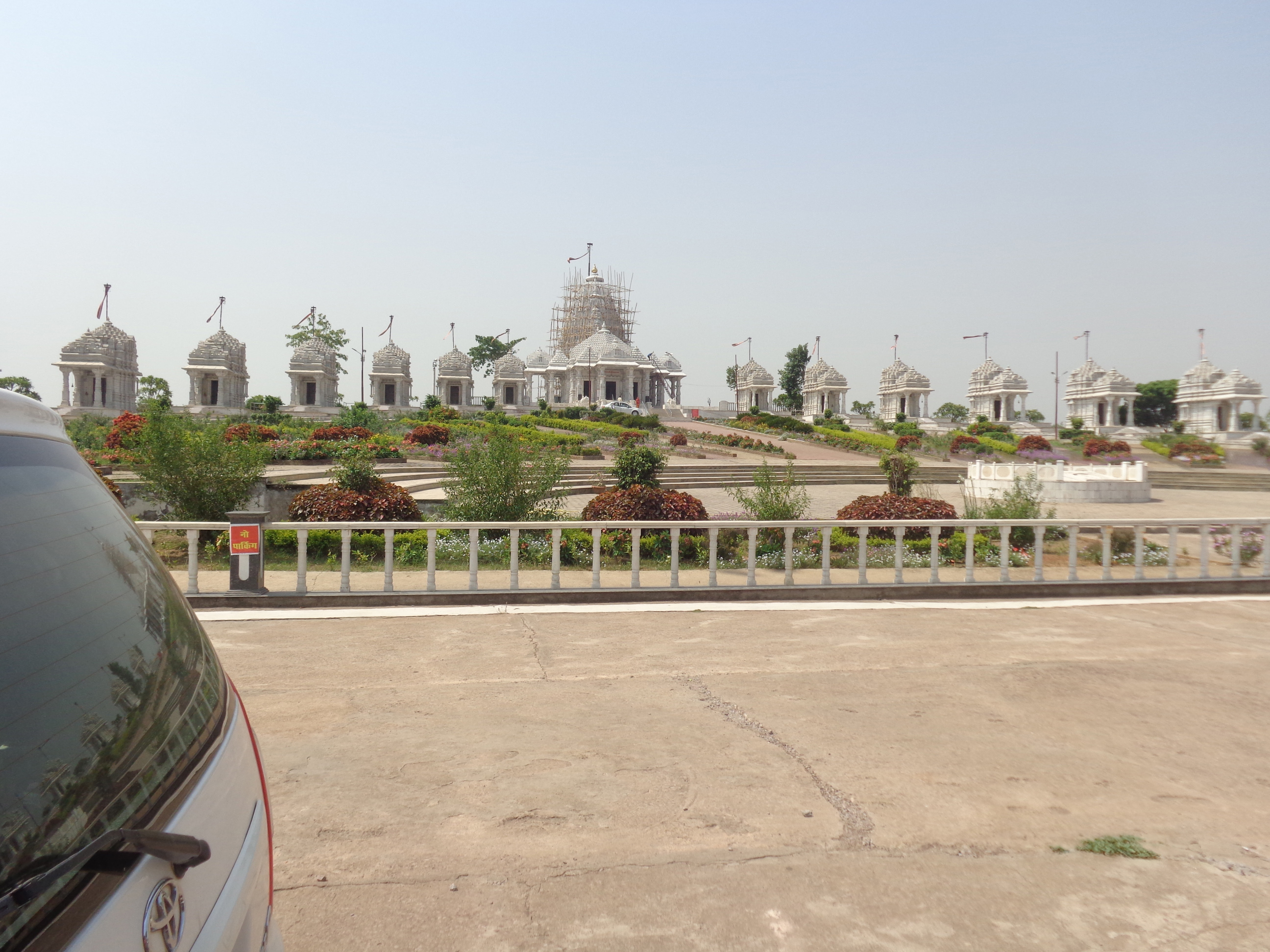
Kevalya Dham Jain Tirth

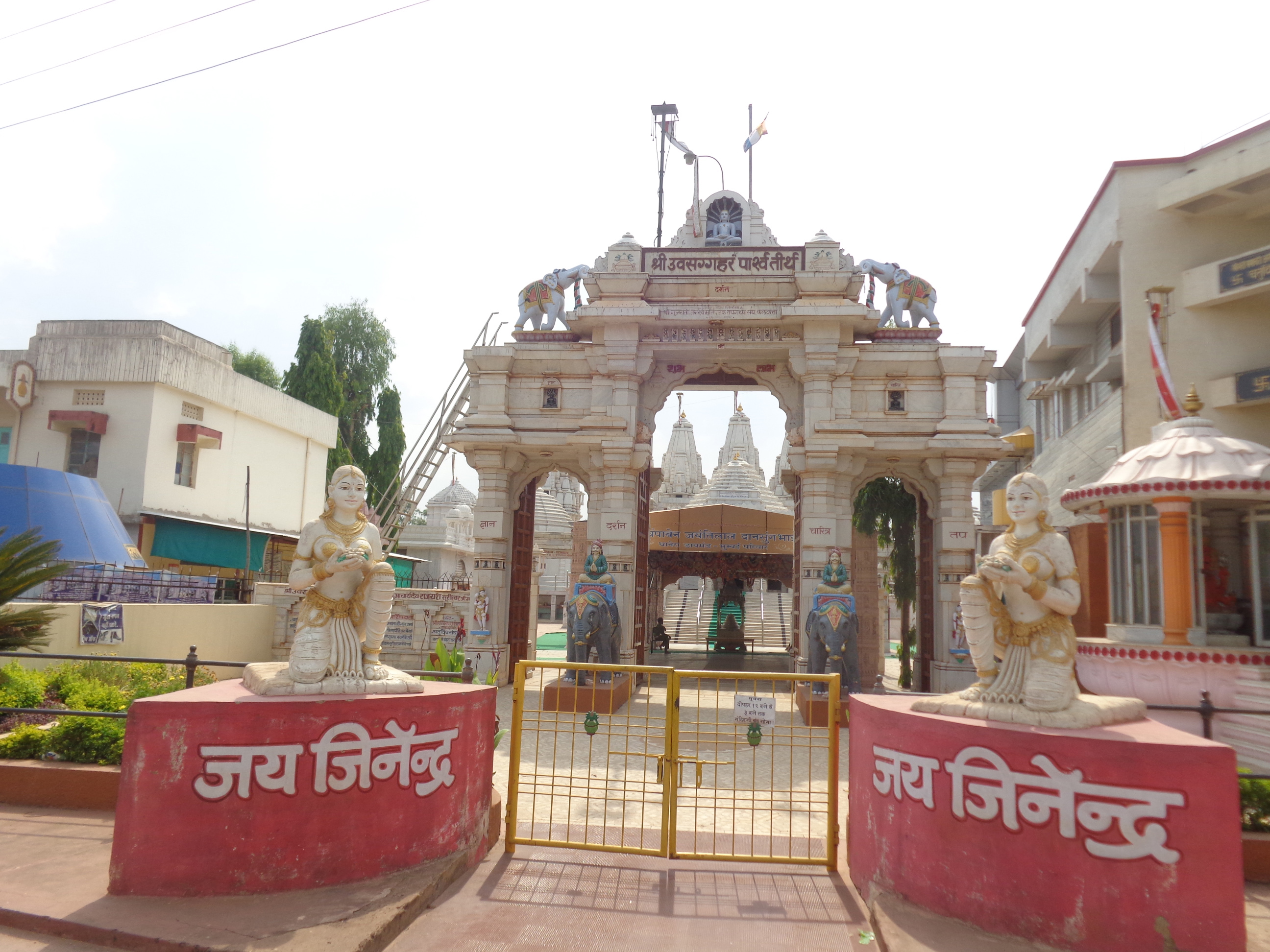
Uwasaggaharam Parshwa Teerth
- Arang Jain temples, Arang
- Kevalya Dham, Kumhari
- Uwasaggaharam Parshwa Teerth, Durg

=== Daman and Diu ===
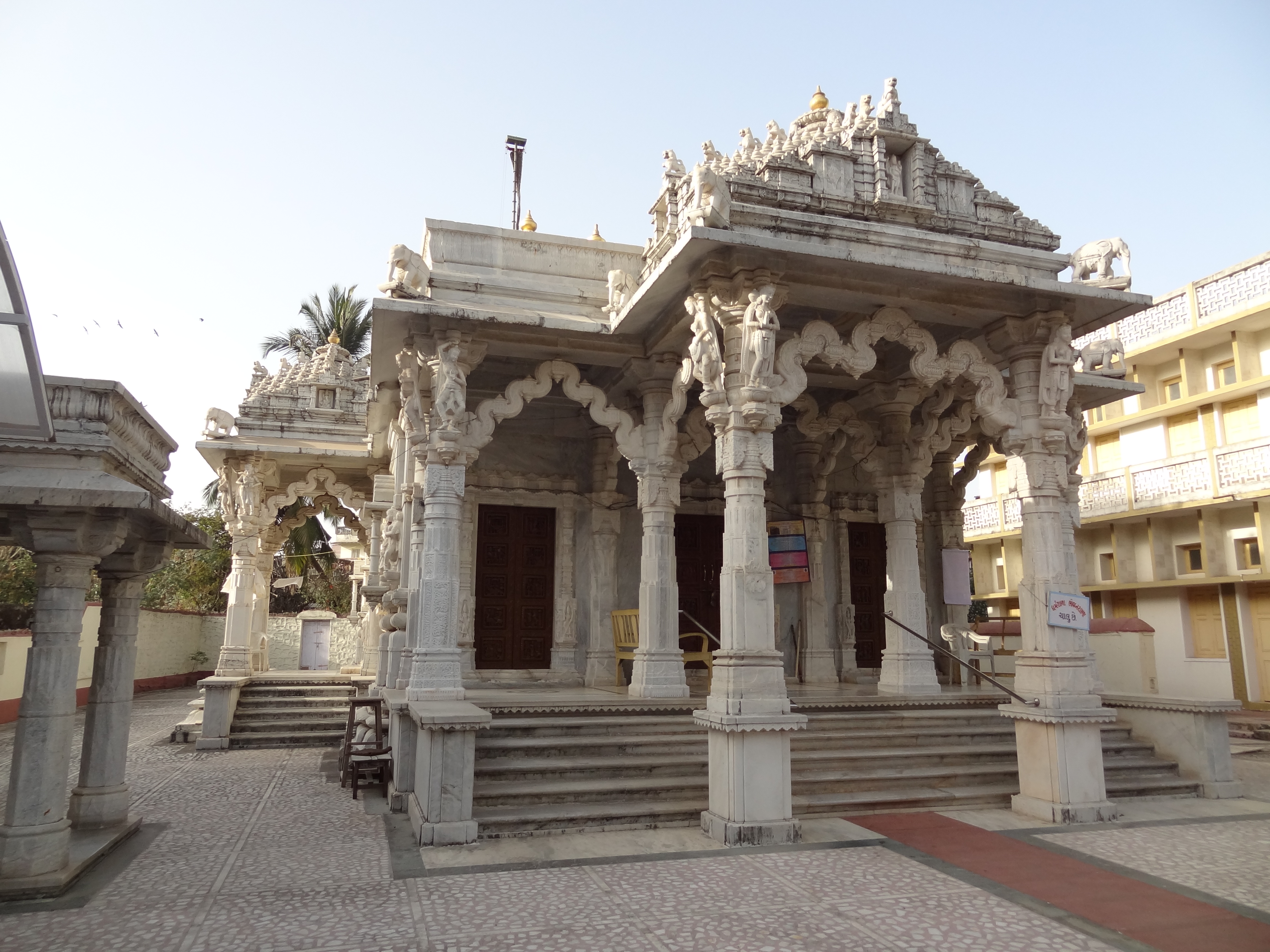
Jain Temple inside Nani Daman Fort
- Jain Temple, Daman Fort

=== Delhi ===
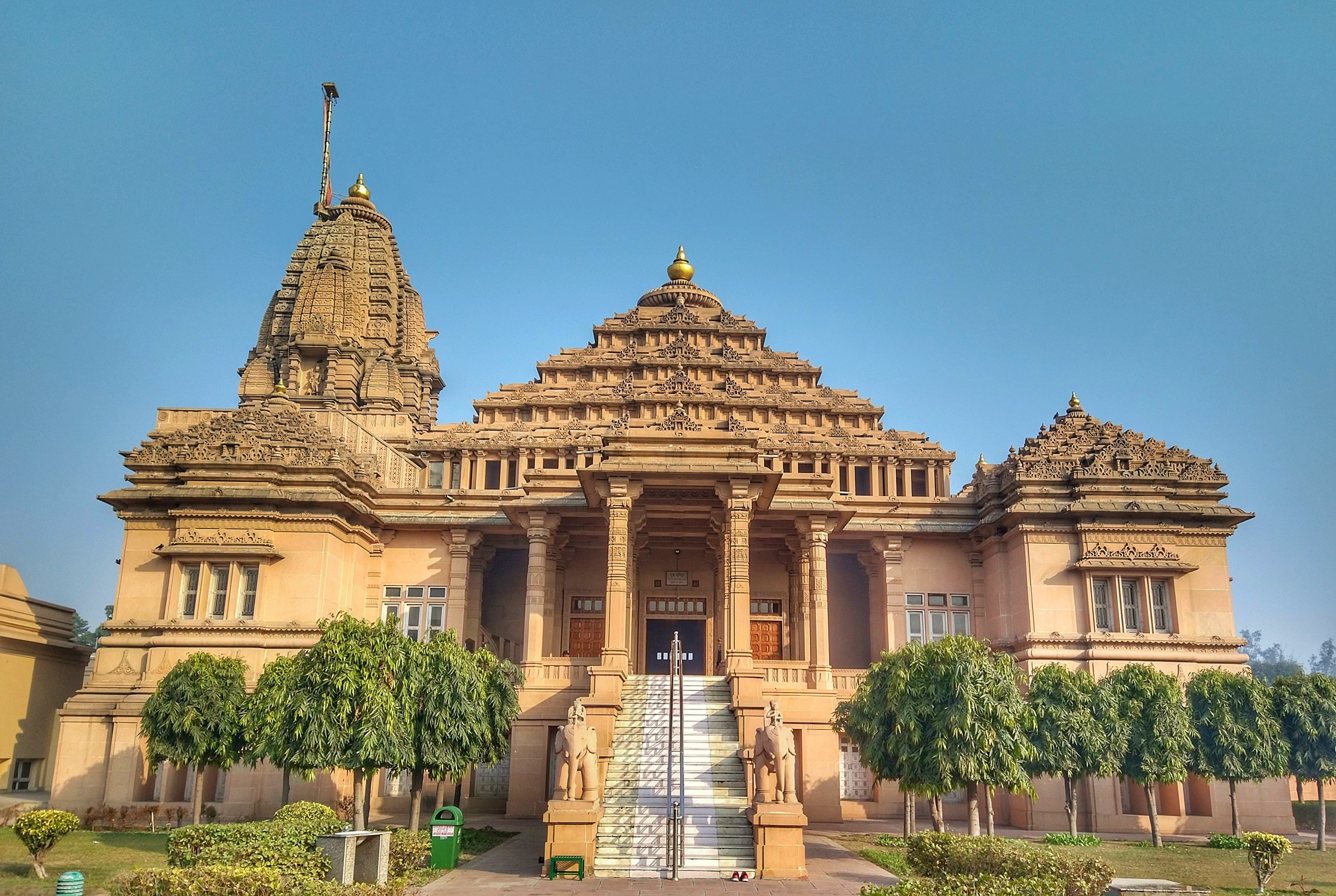
Shri Atma Vallabh Jain Smarak

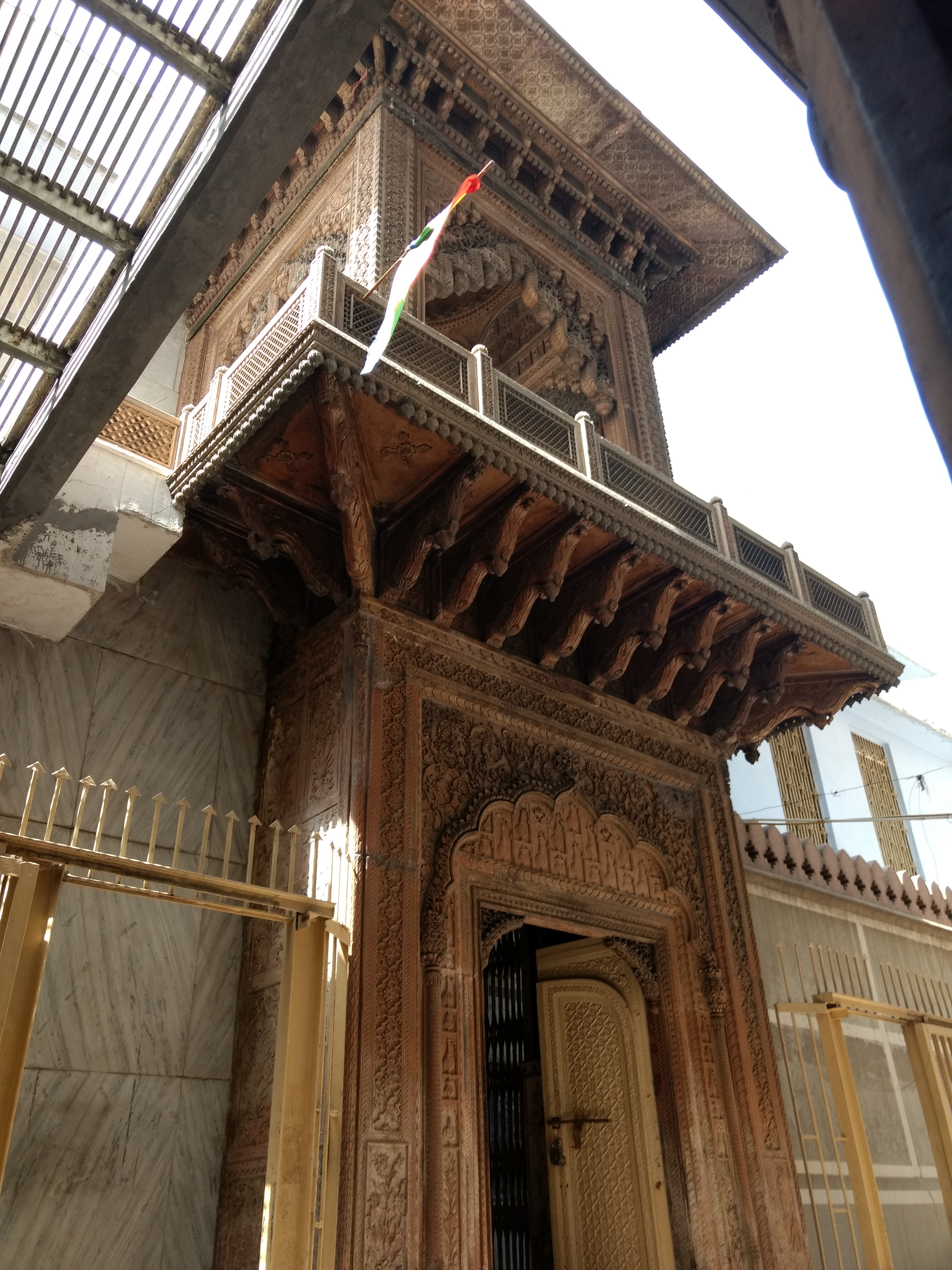
Naya Mandir

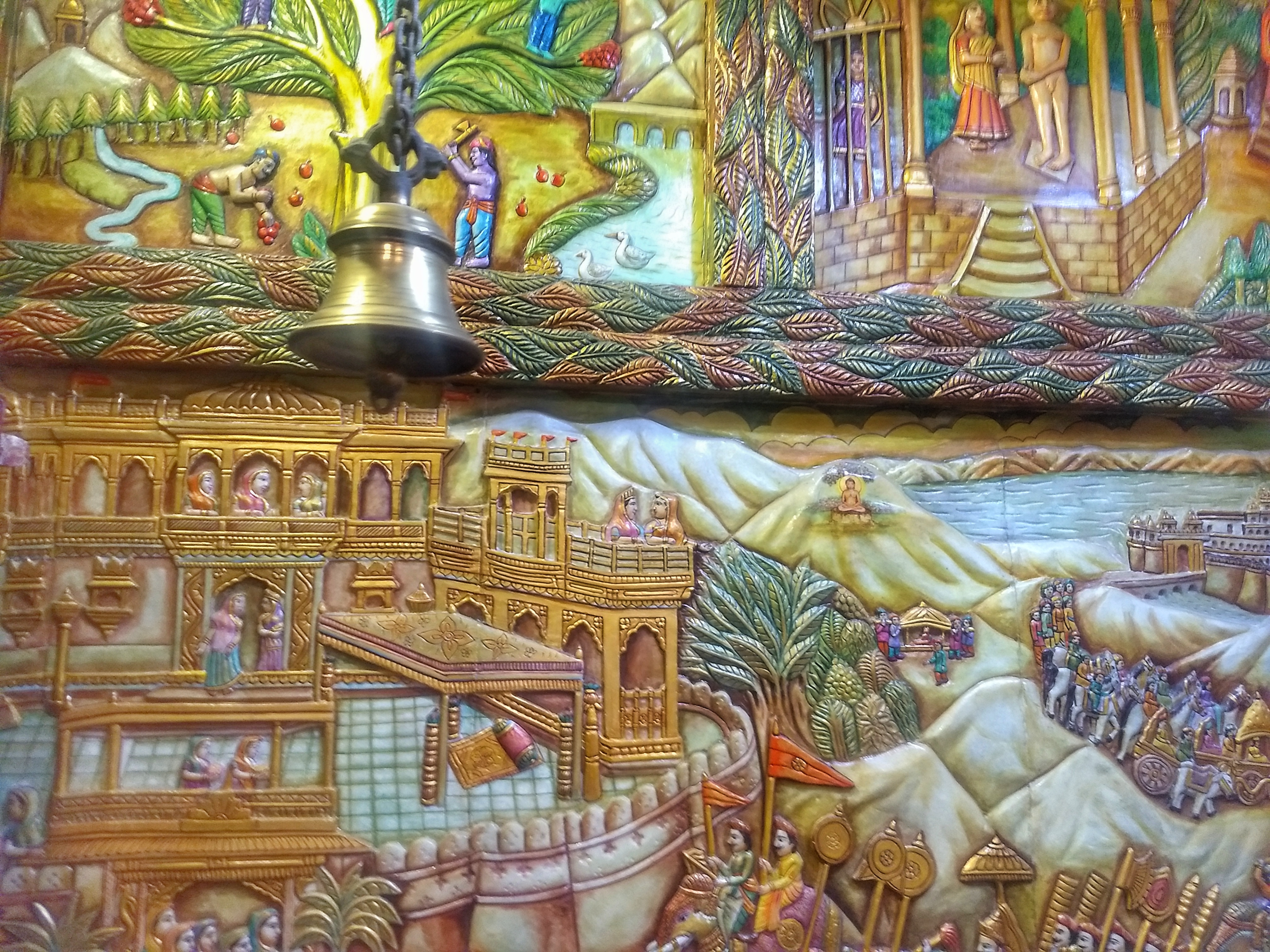
Interior in Shri Padmavati Purwal Digamber Jain Mandir
- Sri Digambar Jain Lal Mandir
- Naya Mandir, Dharampura
- Ahinsa Sthal, Mehrauli
- Shri Atma Vallabh Jain Smarak
- Dādābadī, Mehrauli

=== Goa ===
- Neminath Jain Basti at Bandivade
- Cudnem Jain Temple
- Narve Jain Temple Ruins

=== Gujarat ===
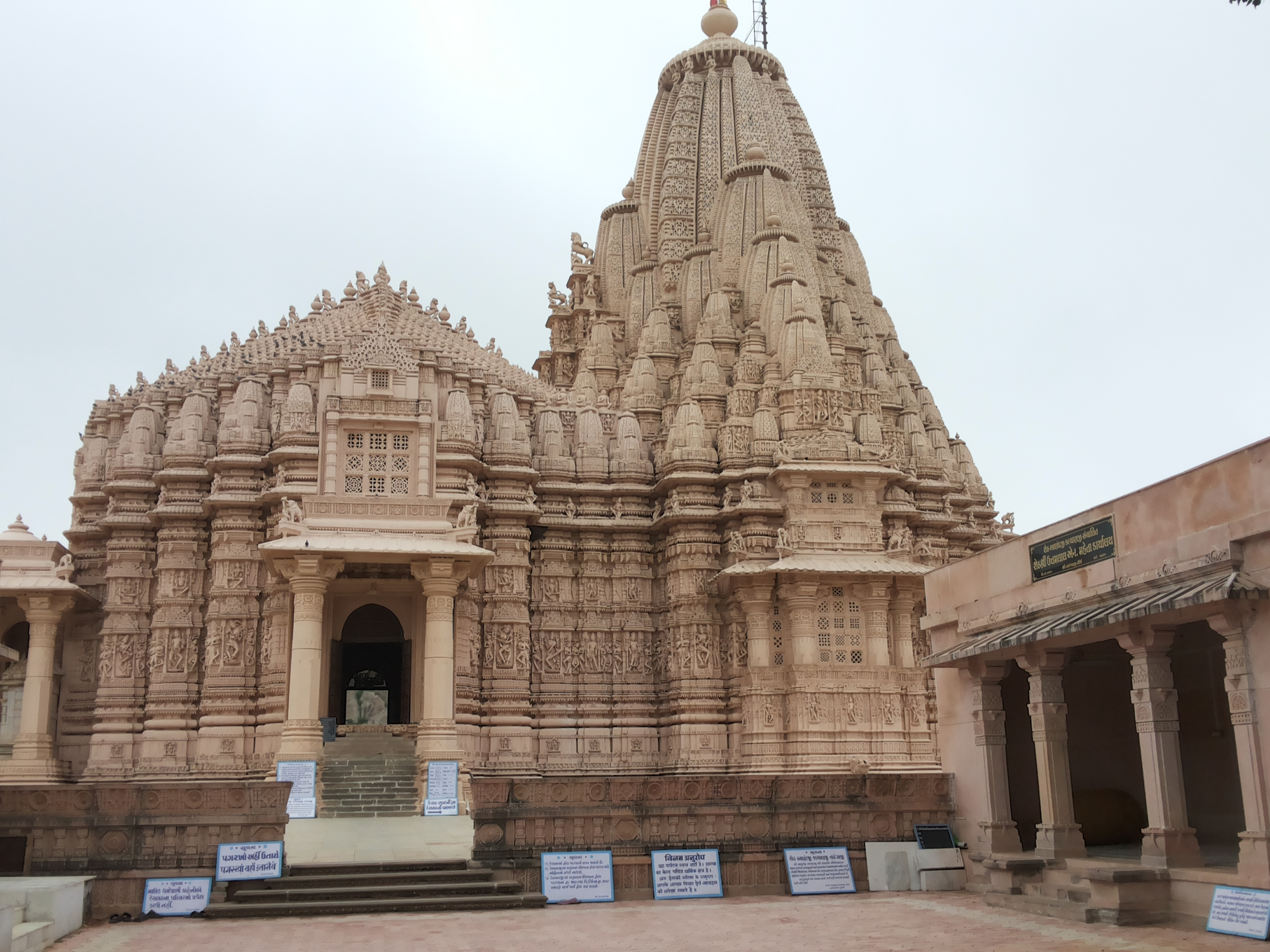
Ajitnath Temple

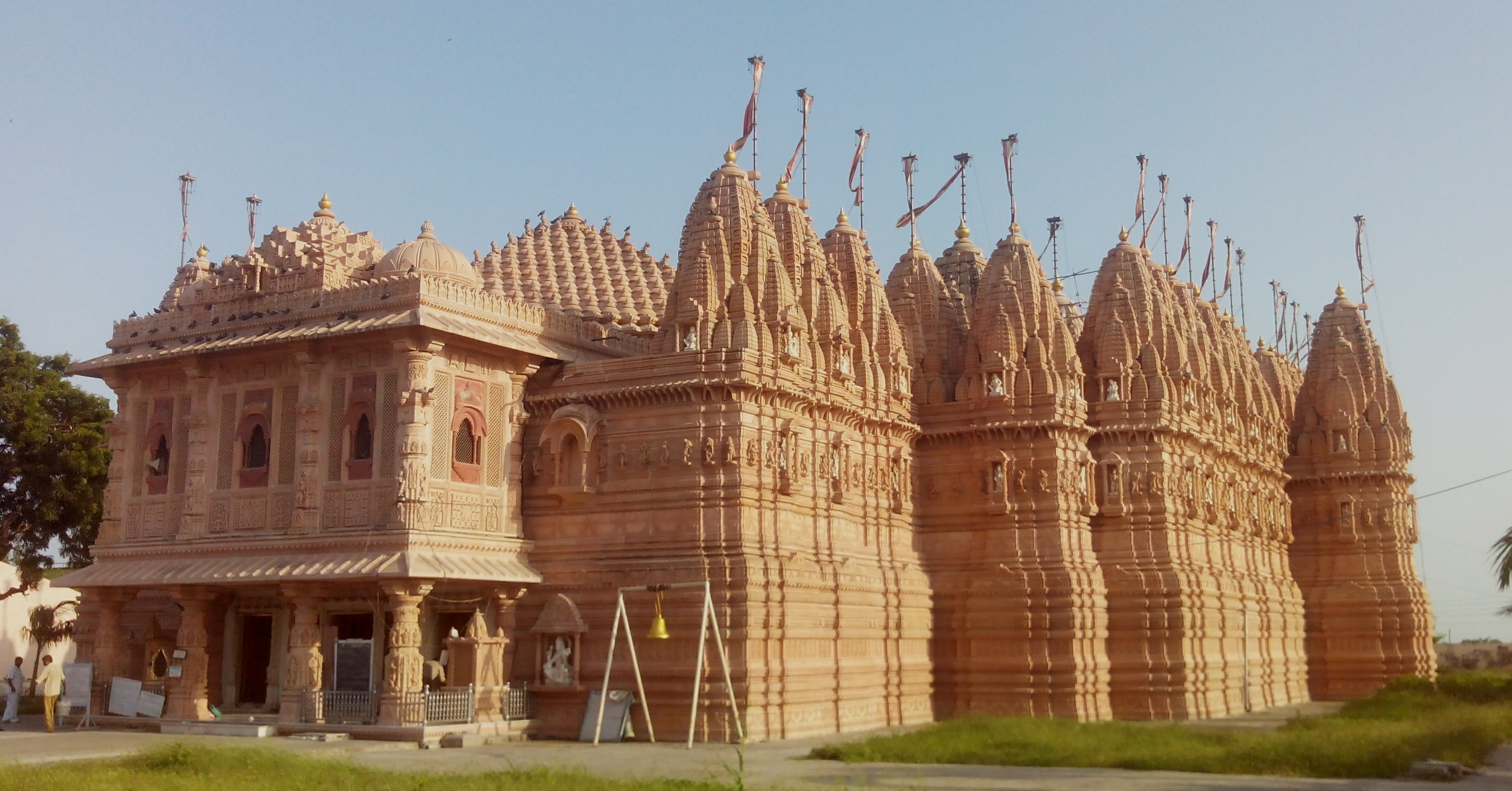
Vasai Jain Temple

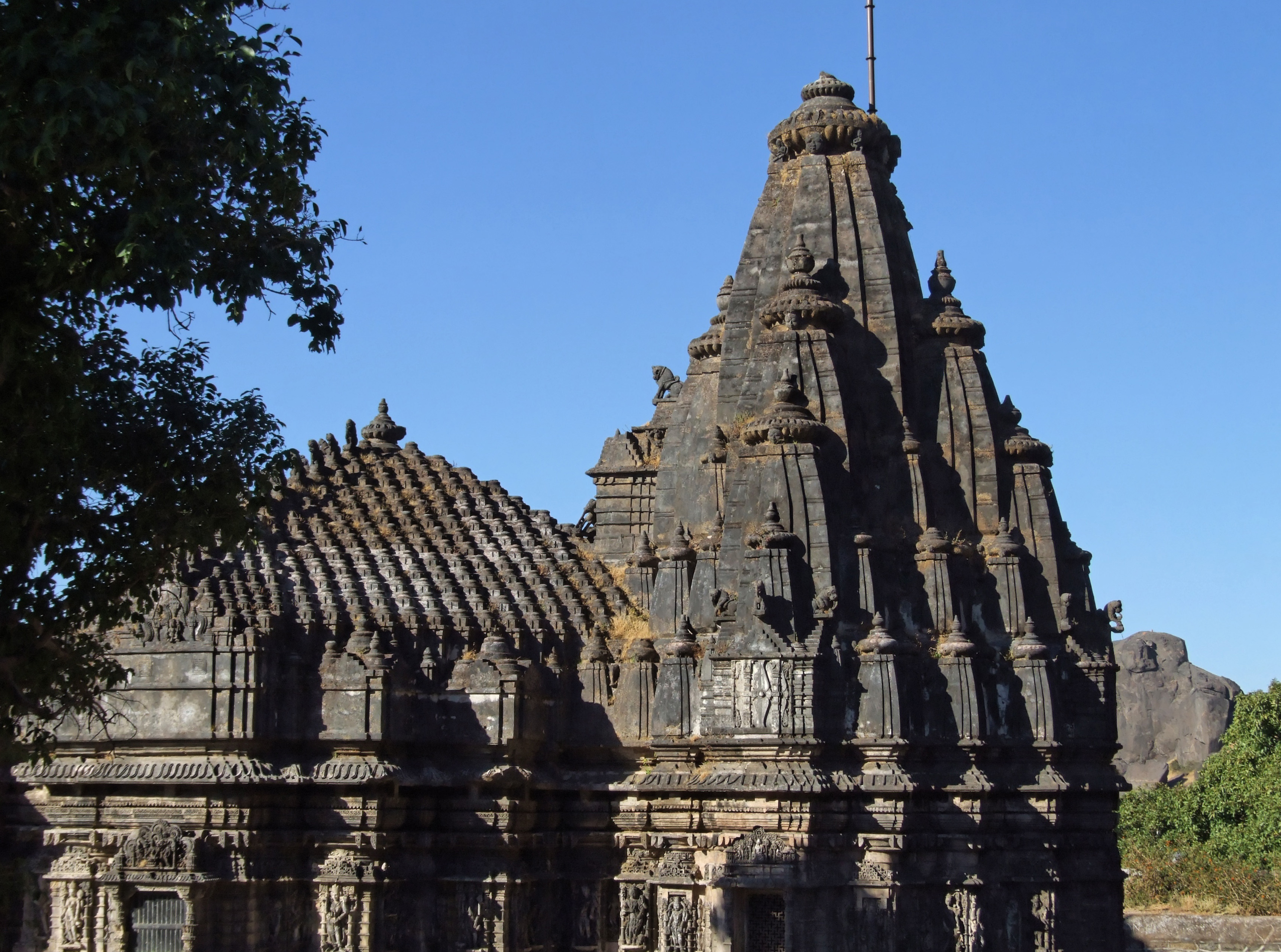
Girnar

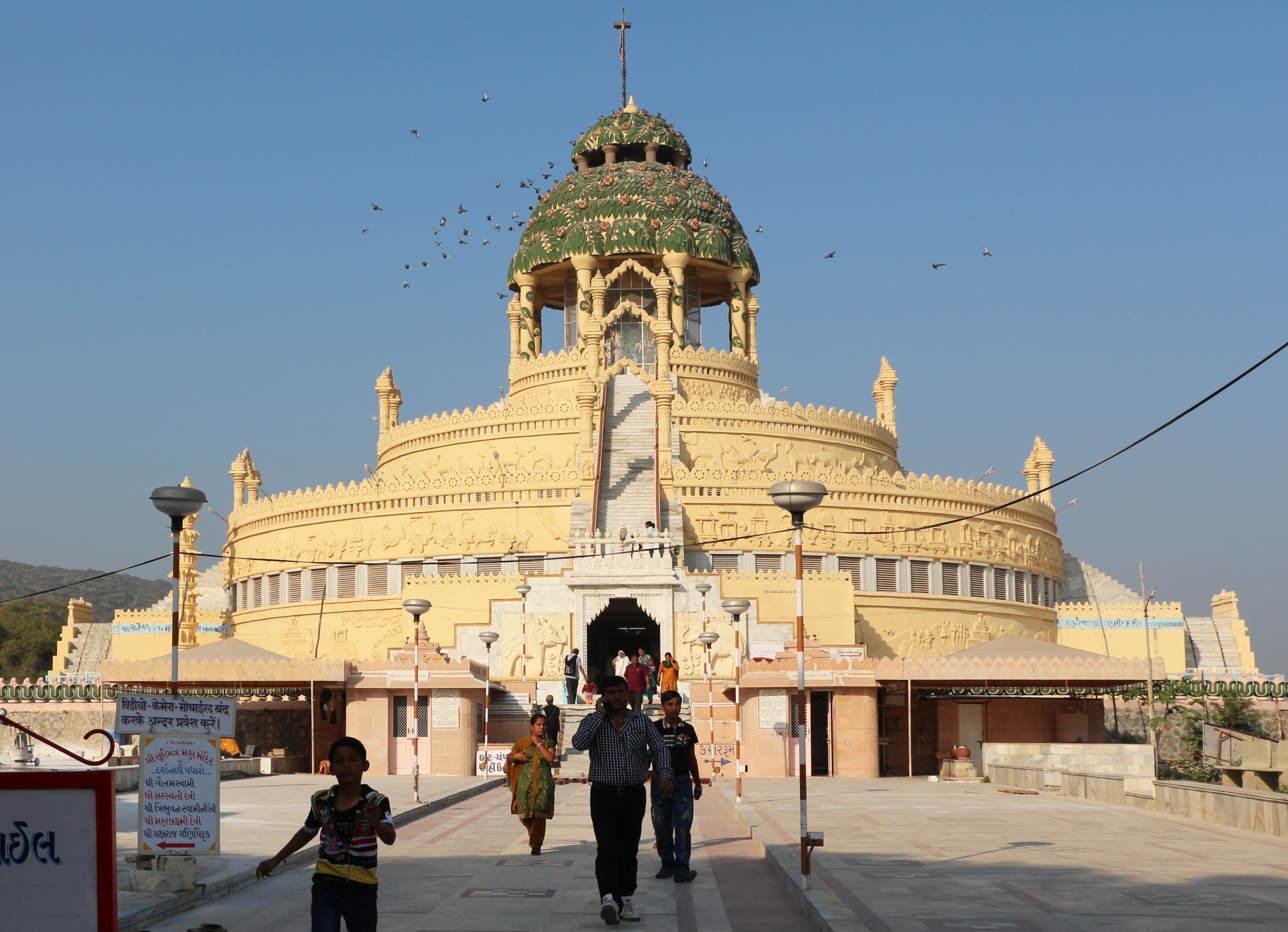
Samovsaran Mandir, Palitana Teerth

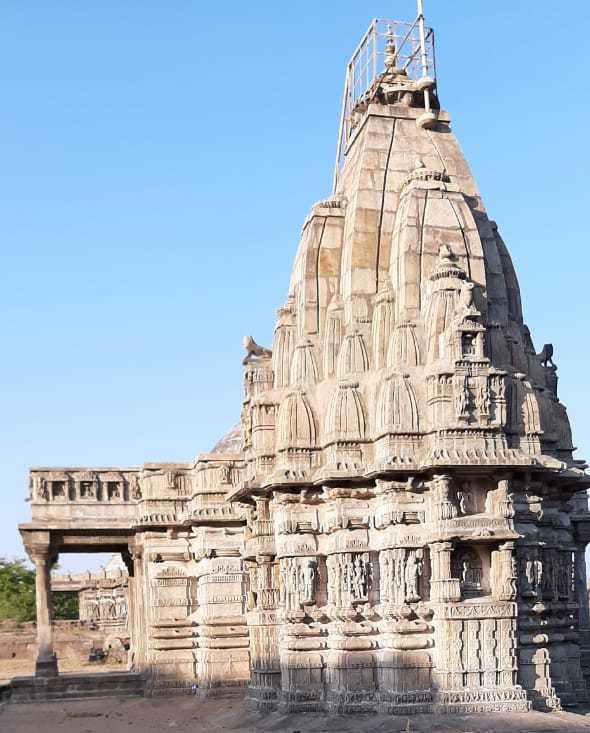
Pavagadh Jain temples part of Champaner-Pavagadh Archaeological Park, a UNESCO World Heritage Site

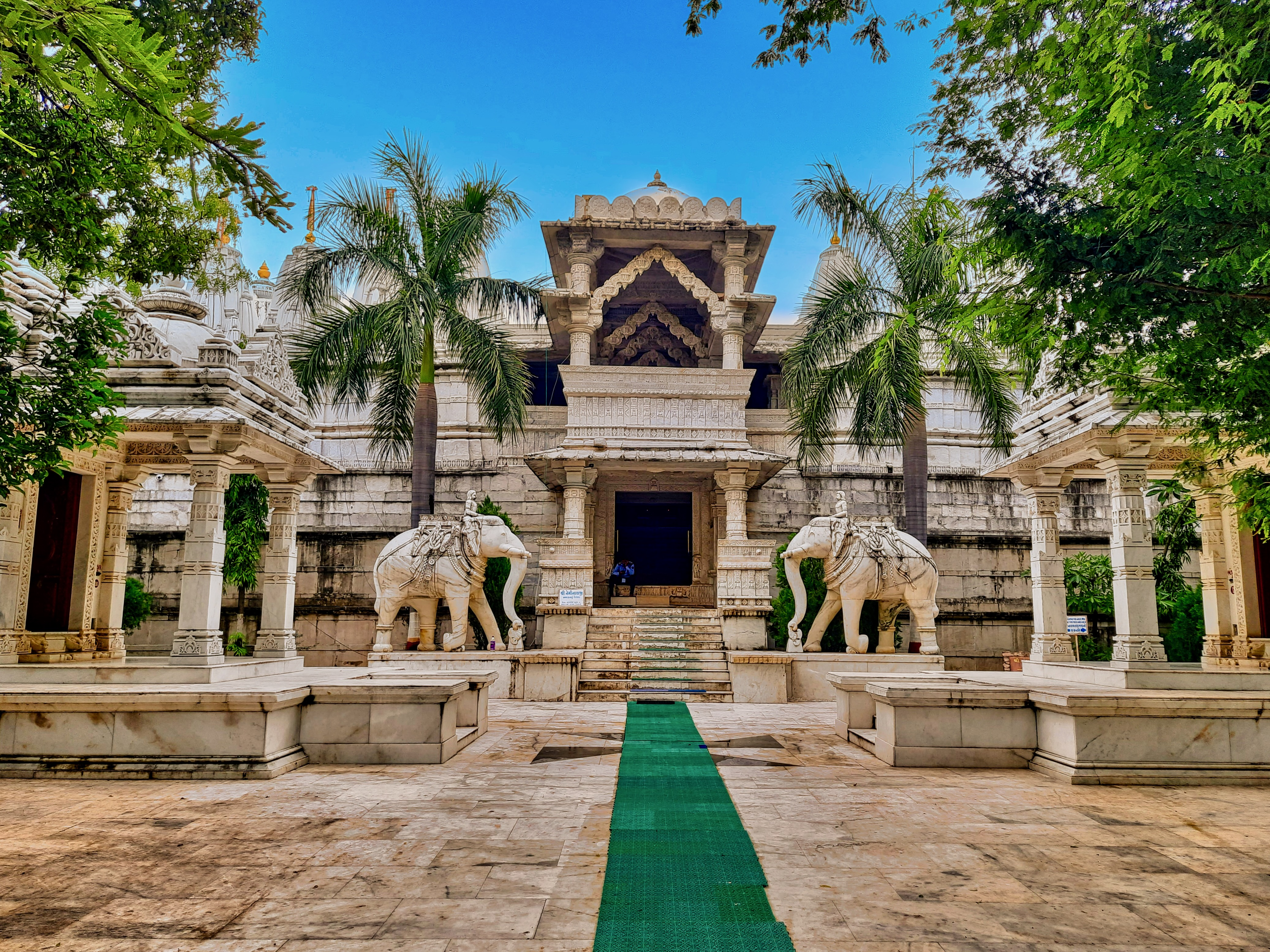
Neminatha temple, Kumbharia

Cave temple

- Bava Pyara Caves
- Dhank Caves
- Talaja Caves

Main temple

Shri Dharampur Tirth (Jain Mandir) most visited Jain temple in Gujarat

- Palitana Tirtha,
- Shri Shankeshwar Tirth
- Girnar Jain temples
- Taranga Jain temple
- Hutheesing Jain Temple
- Vasai Jain Temple in Bhadresar
- Mahudi Jain Temple
- Shantinath Jain temple in Kothara, Kutch
- Kumbharia Jain temples
- Panchasara Parshwanath temple, Patan
- Songadh Tirtha – main tirth for Kanji Panth
- Vataman
- Jain temples, Abhapur
- Trimandir, Adalaj in Gandhinagar
- Shri Pavagadh Tirth
- Naliya Jain Derasar
- Simandhar Swami Jain Derasar in Mehsana
- Pallaviya Parshwanath Temple in Palanpur
- Vardhman Shah's Temple and Shantinath Mandir in Jamnagar
- Chintamani Jain Temple in Surat
- Shri Talaja Tirth
- Simandhar Swami Jain Derasar in Bhilad
- Vijapur Derasar in Vijapur
- Chandaprabhu Digambar Jain Bavan Jinalya, Bhiloda
- Rajgadhi Timbo
- Trimandir, Godhra in Godhra
- Shri Suthri Jain Derasar, Suthari
- Jain Derasar of Tera, Kutch
- Jain temples in Ghogha
- Pushpagiri, Sonkatch

=== Haryana ===
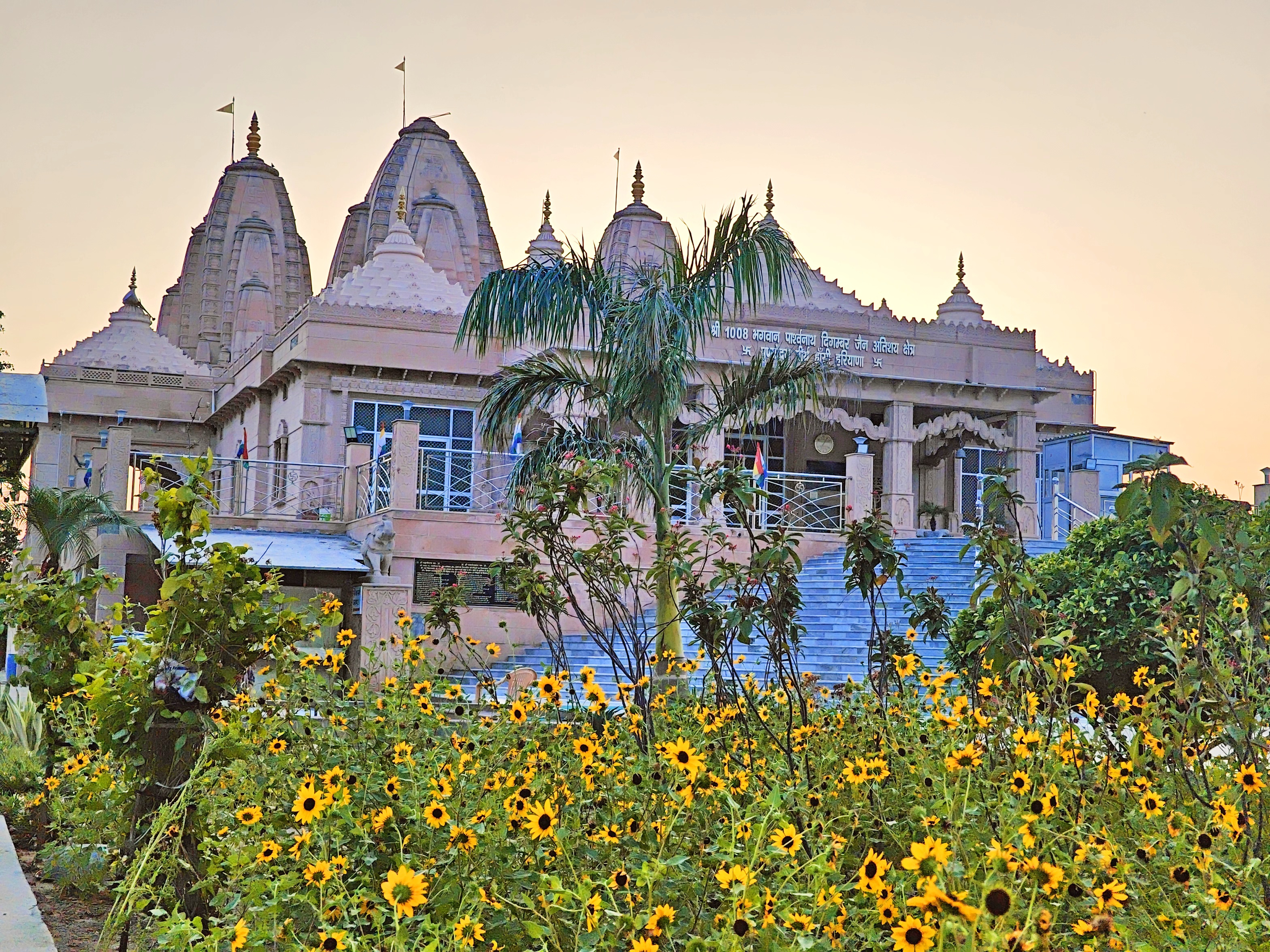
Hansi Jain temple

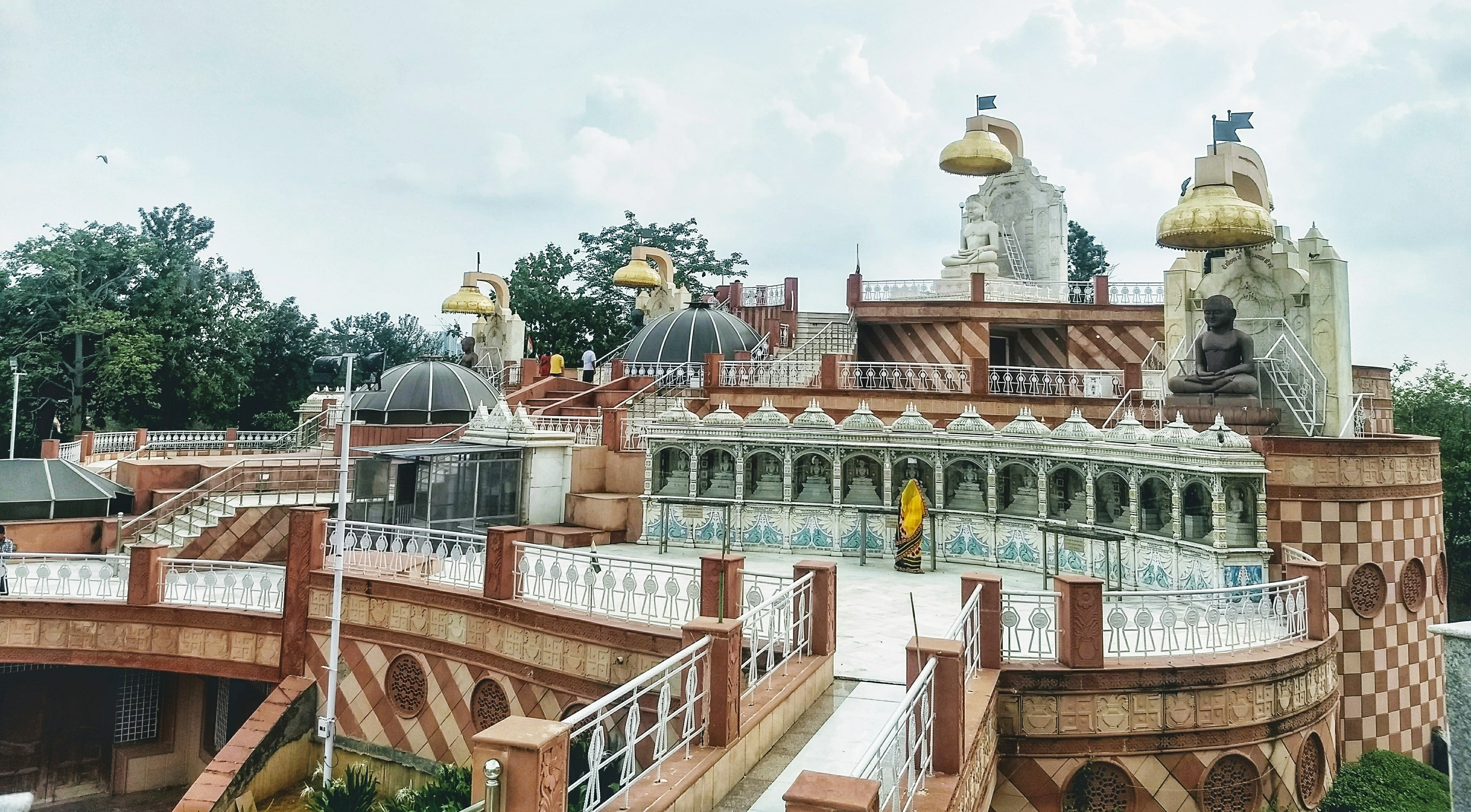
Siddhant Tirth Kshetra Shikohpur

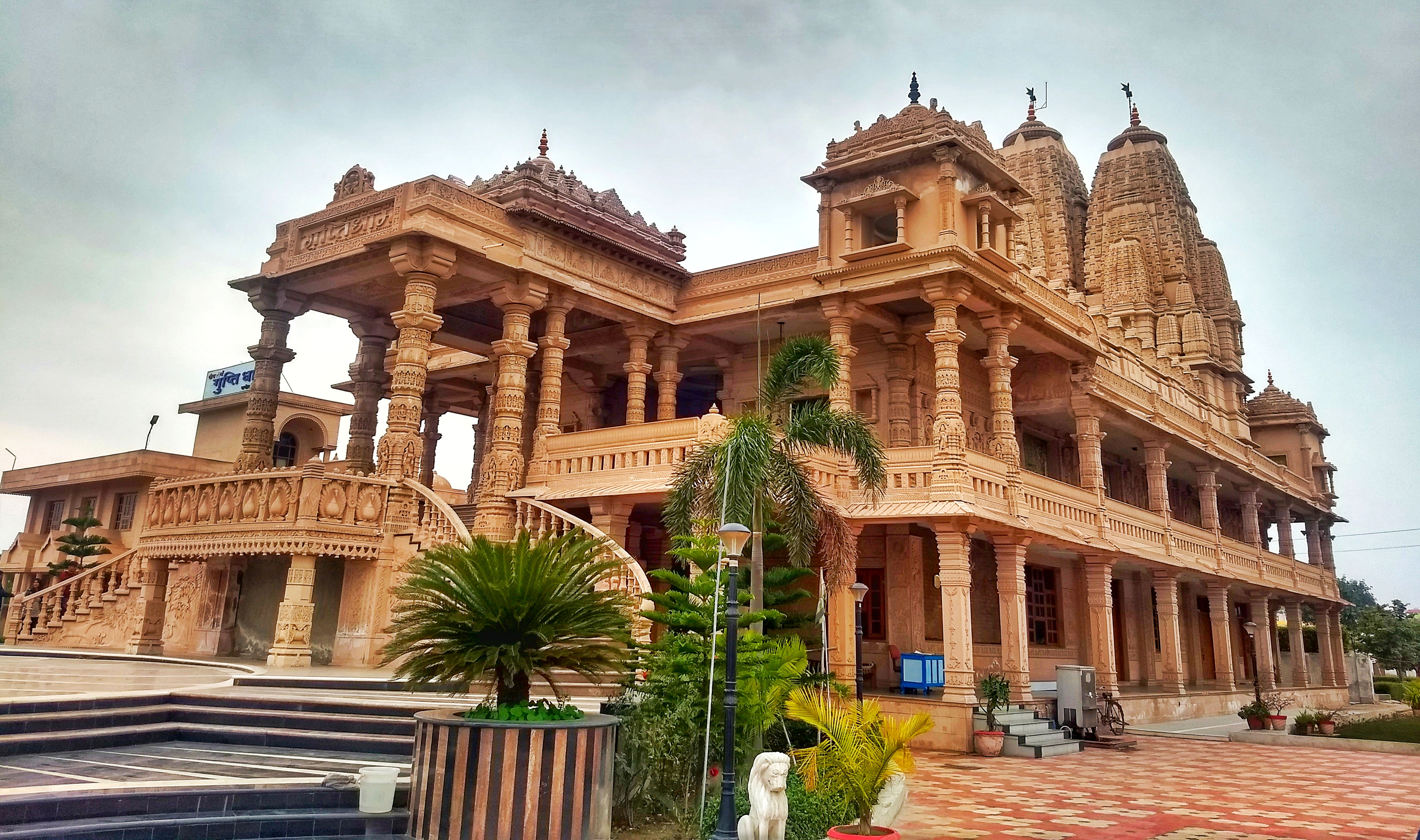
Gupti Dham
- Ranila Jain temple
- Punyoday Tirth
- Dehra Temple

=== Himachal Pradesh ===
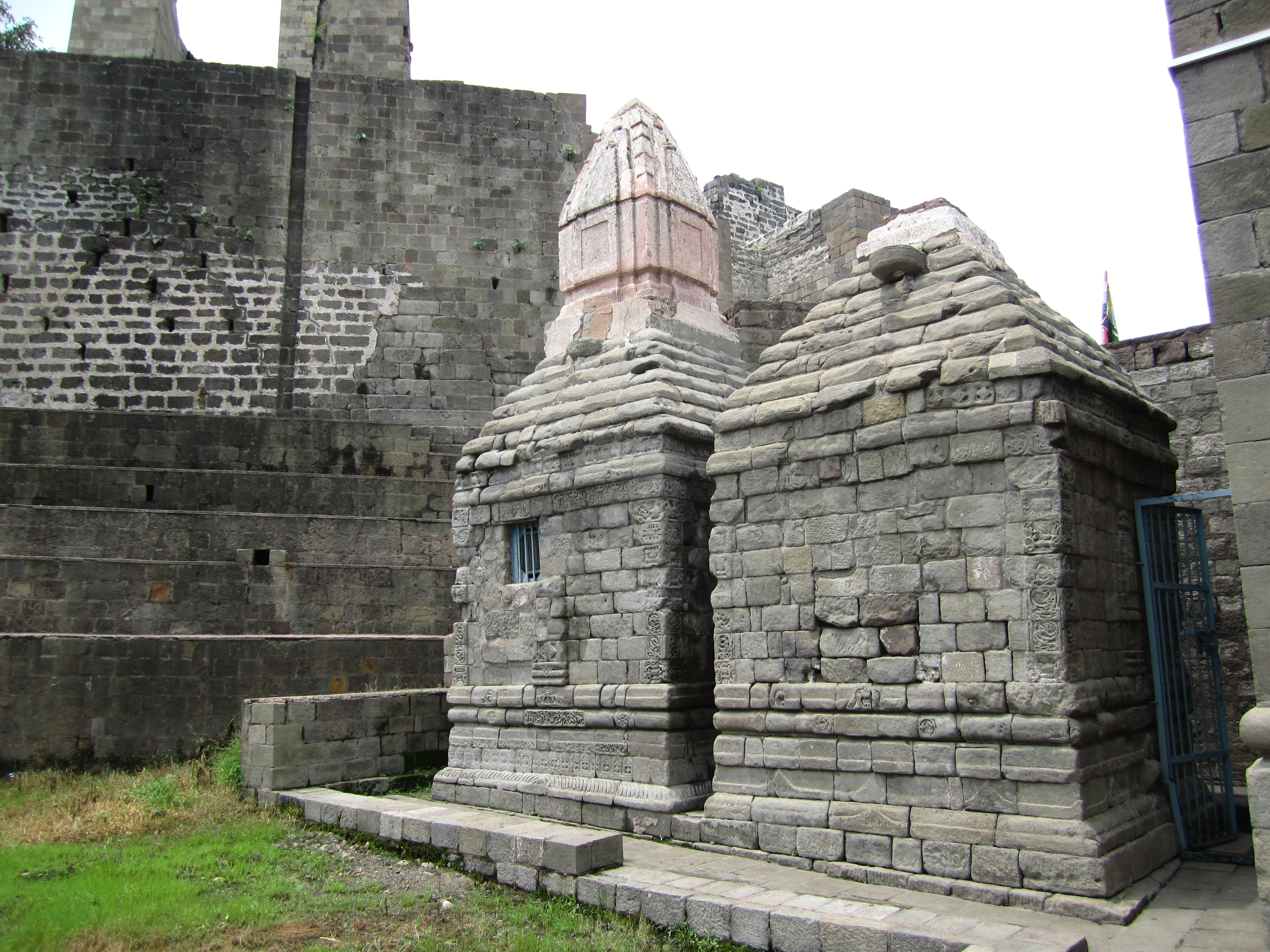
Ambika mata temple, Kangra fort

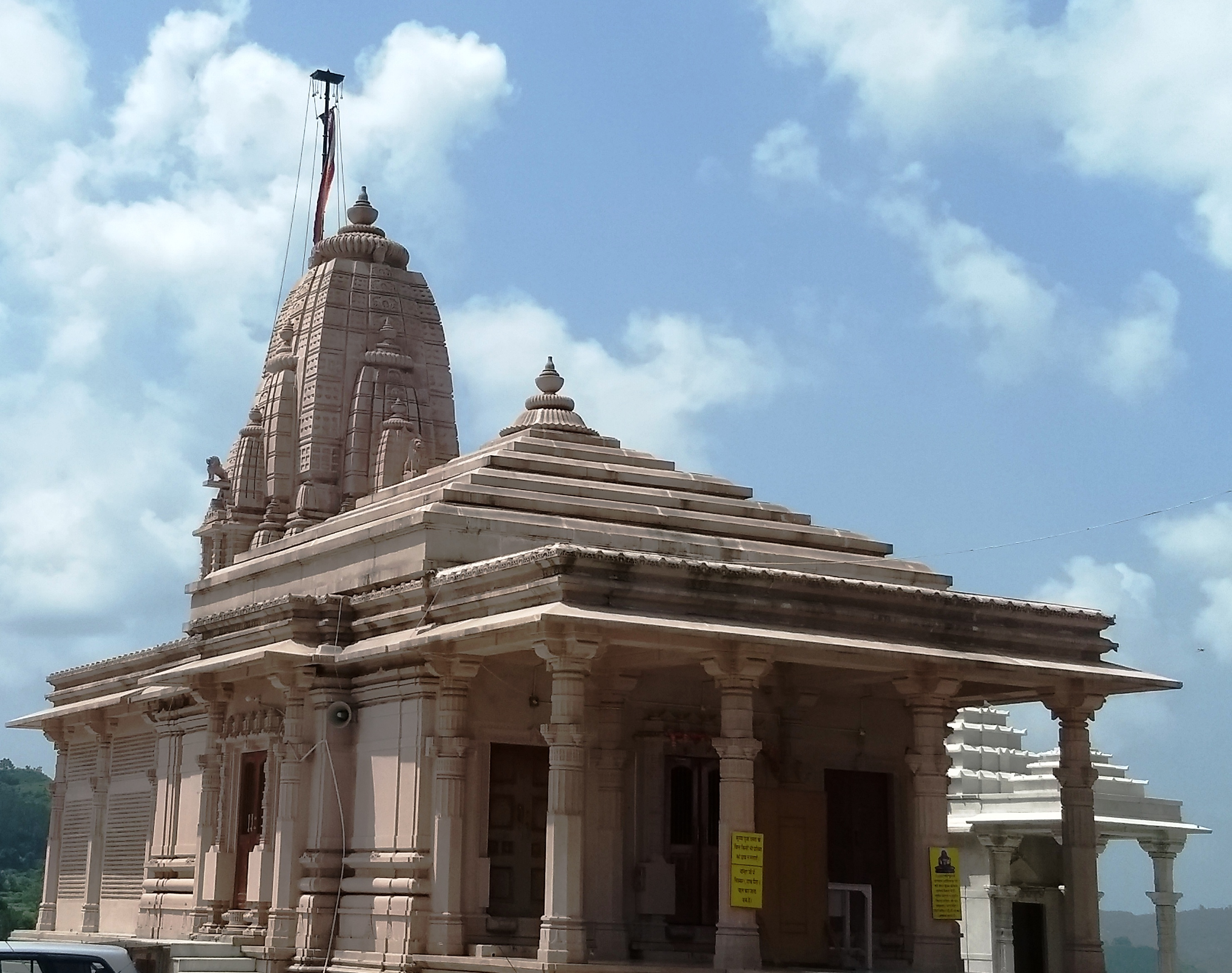
Kangra Śvetāmbara Jain temple
- Ambika mata temple, Kangra fort
- Kangra Śvetāmbara Jain temple

=== Jharkhand ===
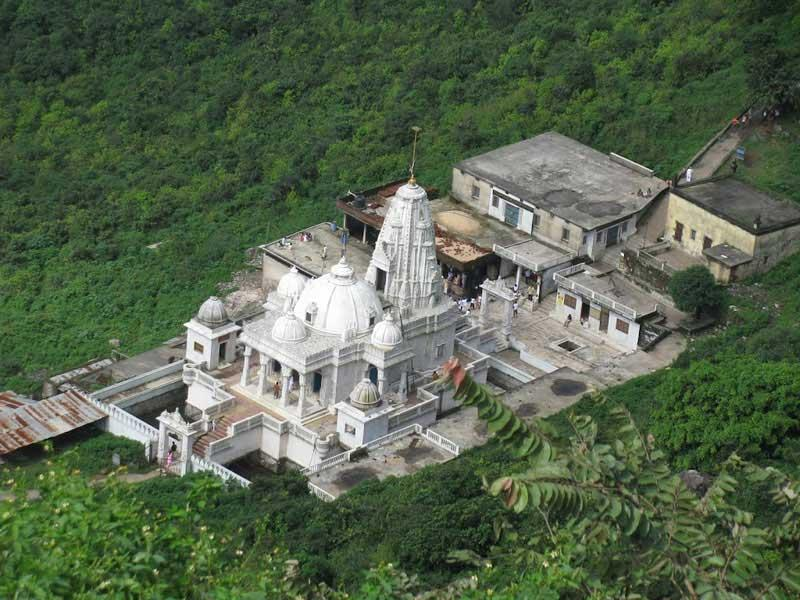
Jal Mandir

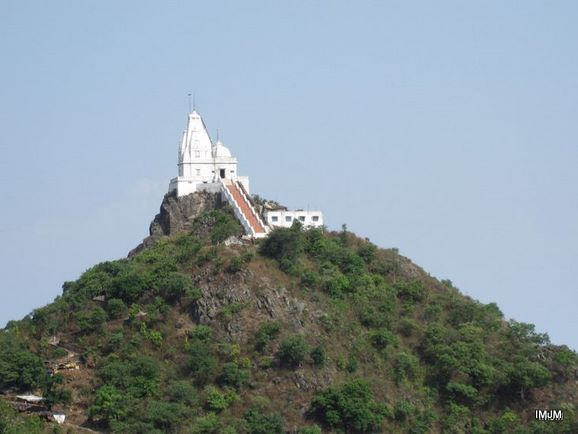
Shri Sammed Shikharji
- Shri Sammed Shikharji

=== Karnataka ===
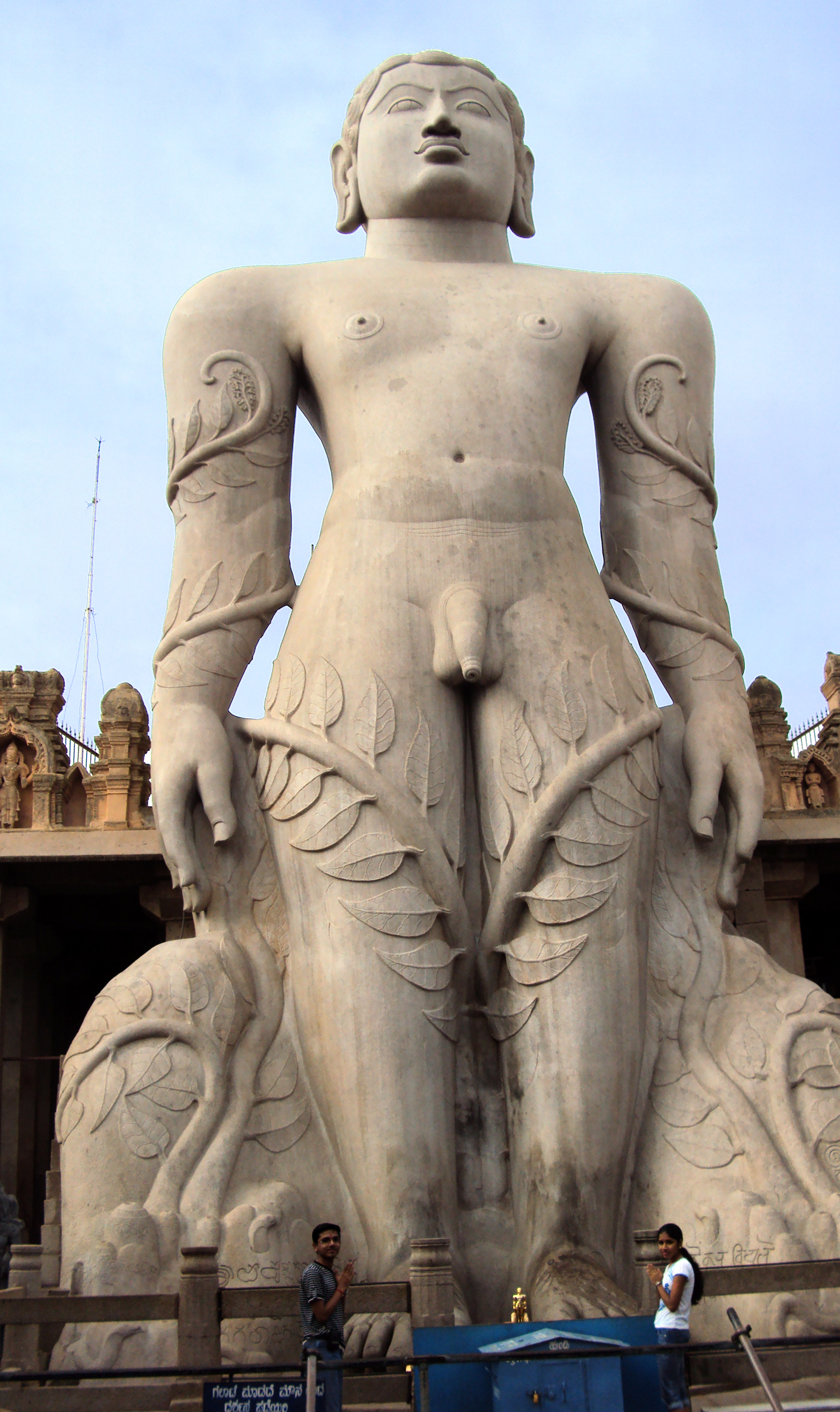
The famous monolithic Gommateshwara statue at Shravanabelagola was built in 10th century

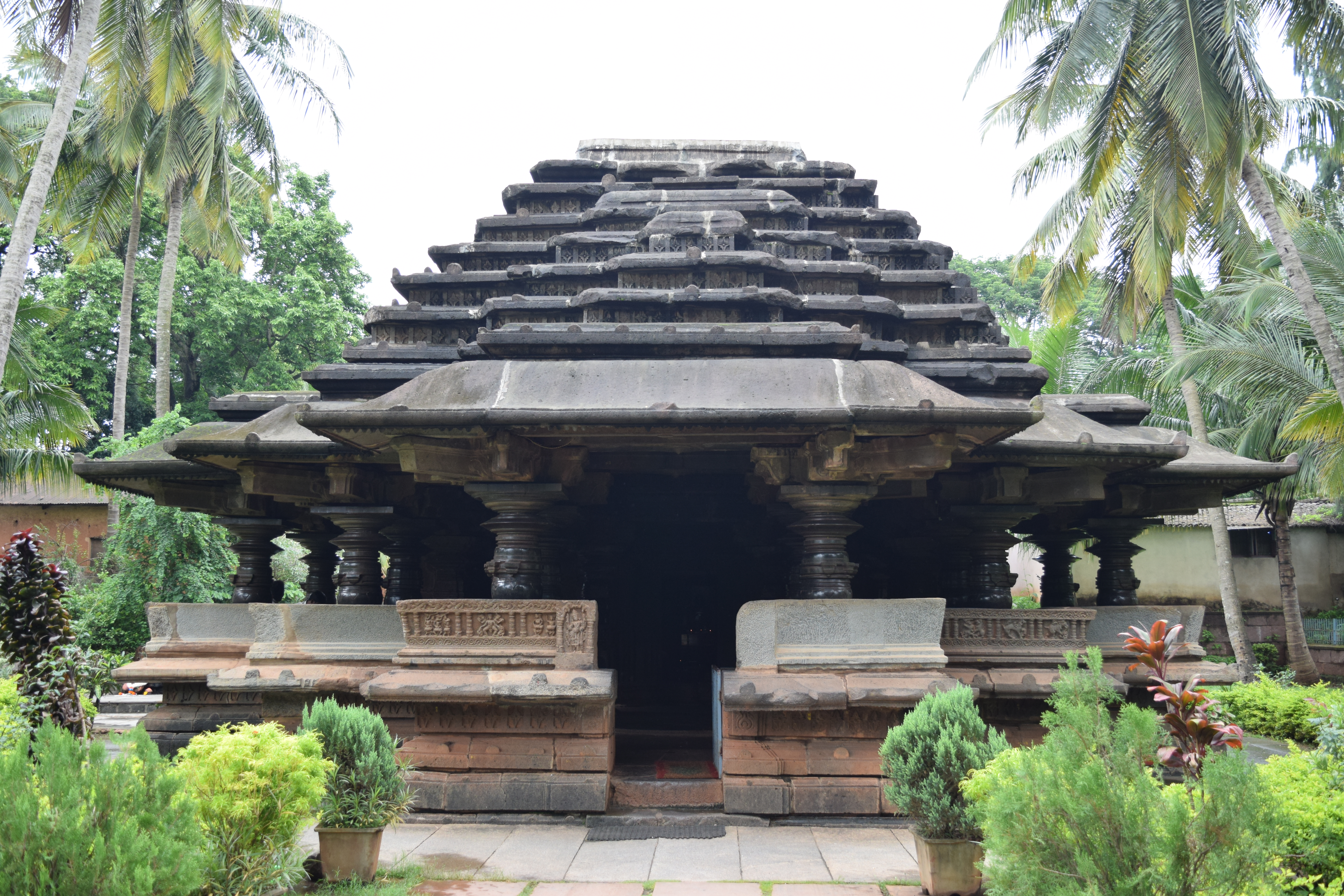
Kamal Basadi at Belgaum Fort

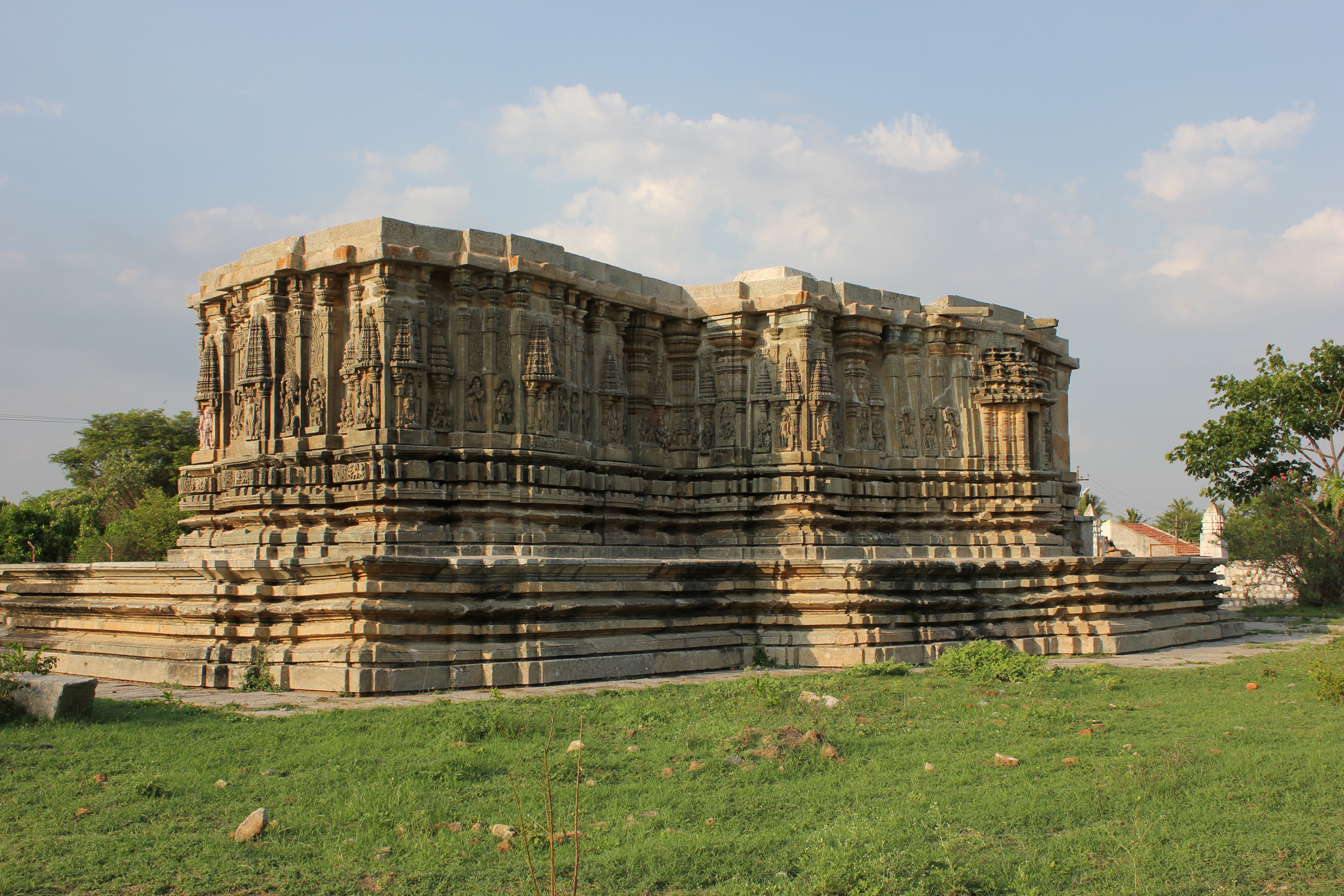
Shantinatha Basadi

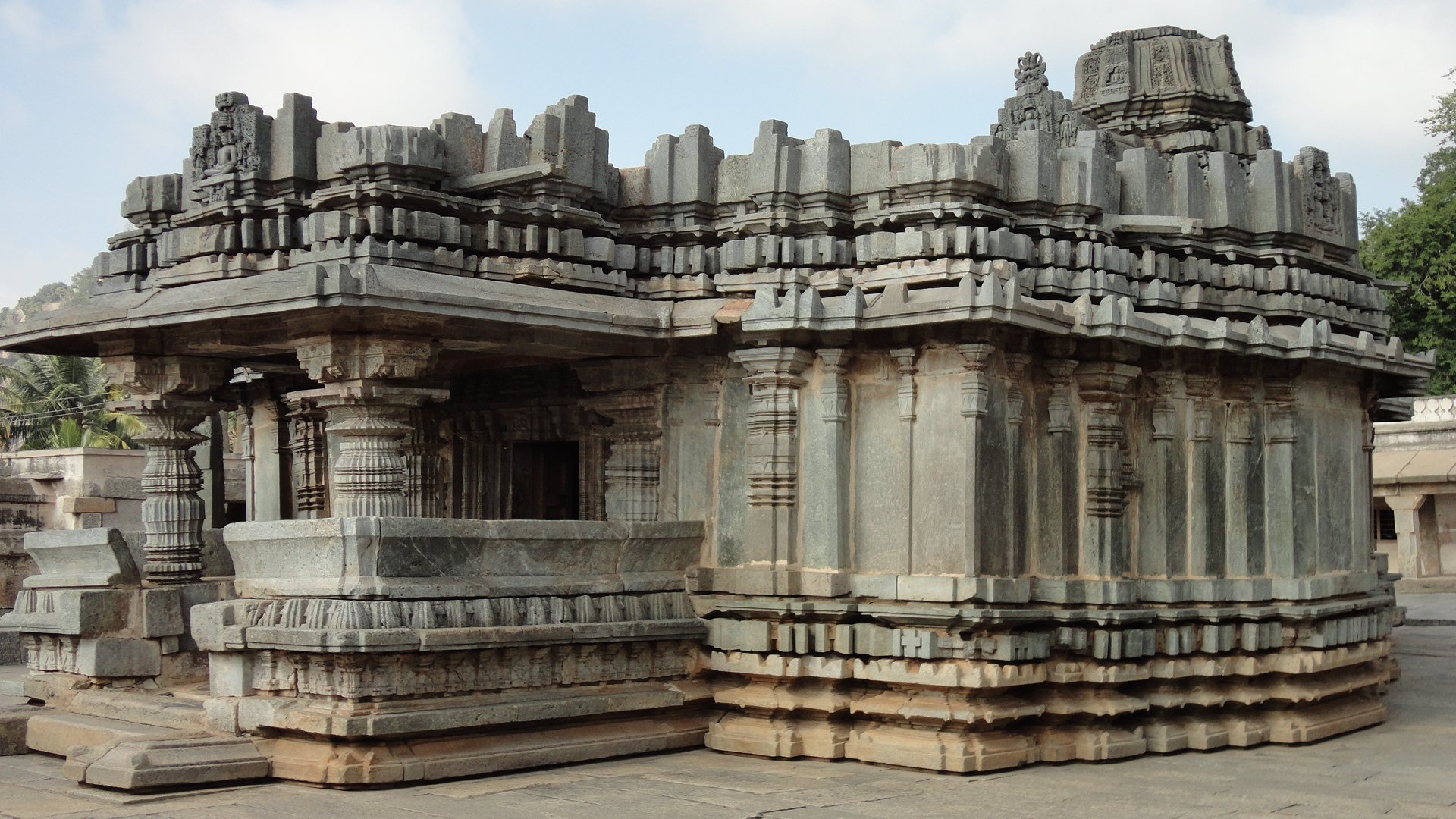
Akkana Basadi

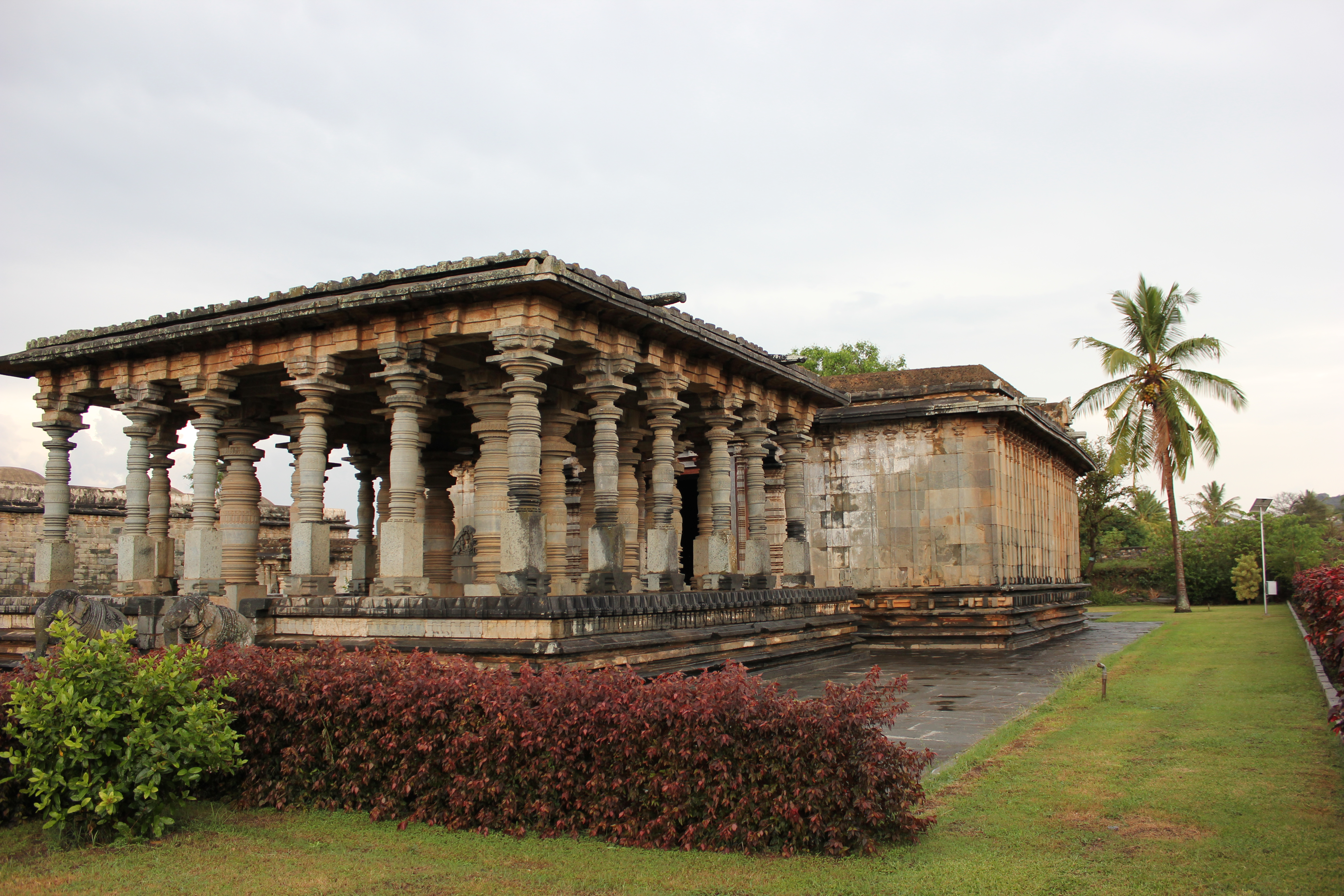
Parshvanatha basadi, Halebidu a UNESCO World Heritage Site

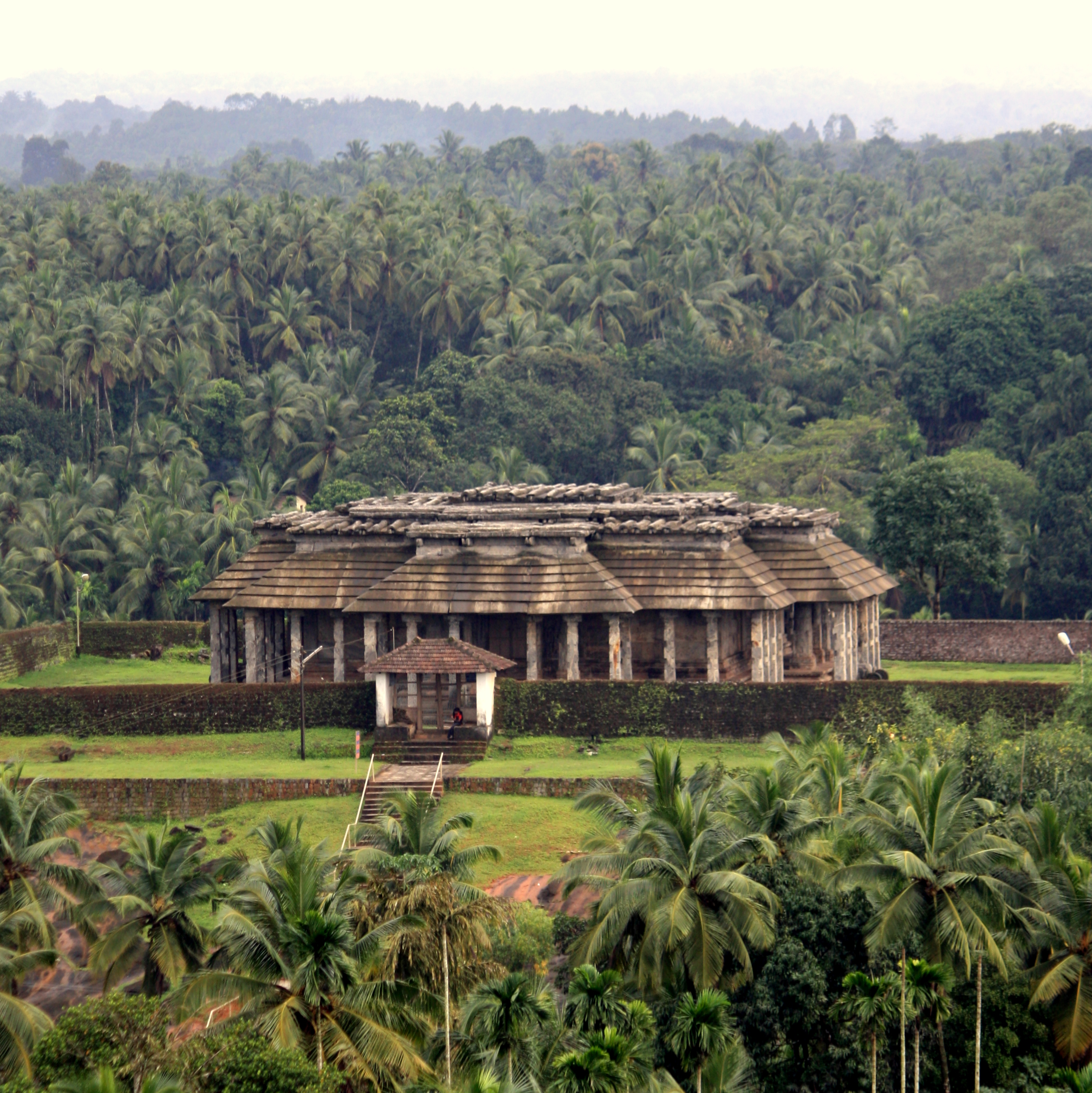
Chaturmukha Basadi

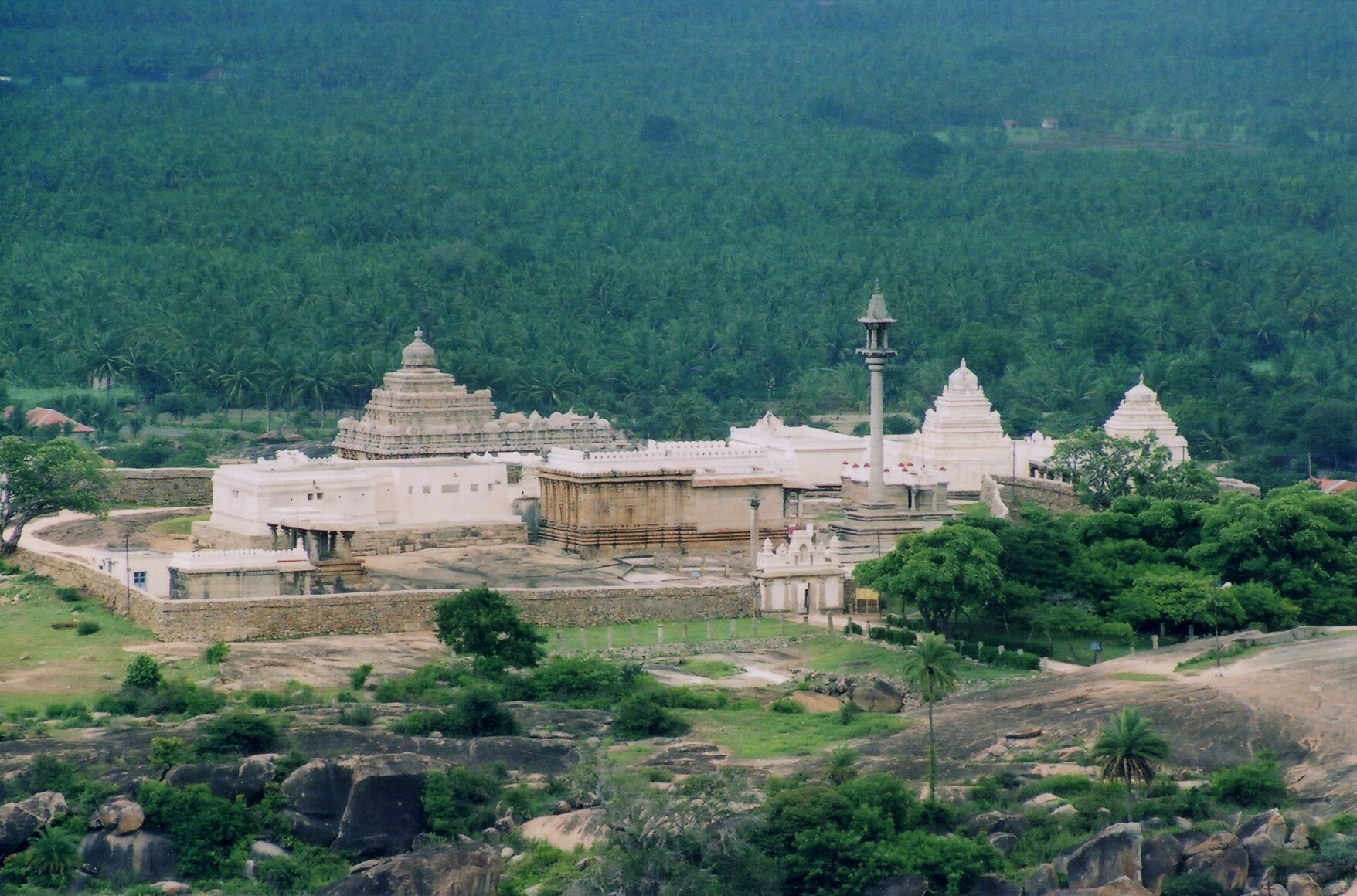
Chandragiri Complex, Shravanbelgola

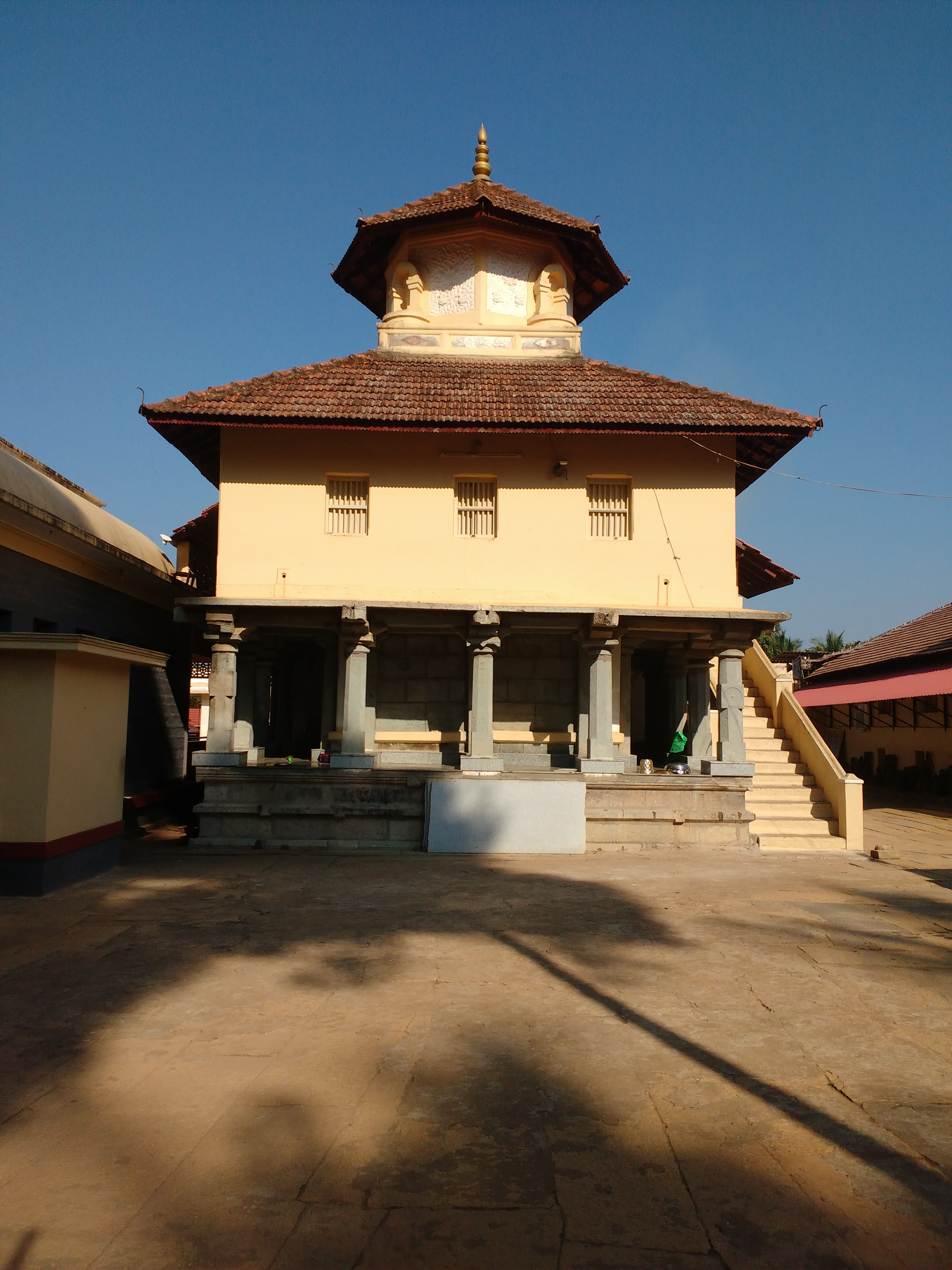
Humcha

Cave temples

- Badami cave temples in Badami
- Aihole cave temple

Main temples

- Shravanabelagola, a monumental Gommateshwara statue (Bahubali) in Hassan district. 27 Basadi complex including Akkana Basadi, Odegal basadi, Parshvanatha basadi, Chandragupta basadi, Bhandara Basadi and Chavundaraya Basadi
- Karkala, 1. Hiriyangadi Basadi 2. Chathurmukha Basadi 3. Padmavathi Kere Basadi. The famous monolithic 42 feet (13 m) Gommateshwara statue the second tallest in Karnataka is also here.
- Dharmasthala, a 39 feet (12 m) Gomateshwara idol.
- Venur, a 35 feet (11 m) Gomateshwara idol.
- Gommatagiri, a 20 feet (6.1 m) Gomateshwara idol.
- Moodabidri, 18 ancient Jain temple including Saavira Kambada Basadi the Thousand Pillars Temple and Guru Basadi
- Brahma Jinalaya in Lakkundi
- Humcha Jain temples
- Navagraha Jain Temple in Hubli
- Sankighatta
- Jain Narayana Temple, Pattadakal
- Kundadri: It is said this is Samadhi sthal of Acharya Kundakunda
- Chaturmukha Basadi in Karkala
- Basadi complex, Halebidu: 1. Parshvanatha Basadi 2. Shantinatha Basadi 3. Adinatha Basadi
- Varanga – This is an important Jain centre. The Kere basadi is located in midst of a lake. There are many other basadis too.
- Aihole Jain complex – Meguti Jain temple, Charanthimatha Group of temples, Yoginarayana group and Jain cave temple
- Kanakagiri Jain tirth
- Shanka Basadi and Ananthanatha basadi at Lakshmeshwara
- Shantinatha Basadi, Jinanathapura
- Panchakuta Basadi, Kambadahalli
- Jain Matha, Shravanabelgola
- Hadavalli Jain Temple
- Simhanagadde Jain temple, Narasimharajapura
- Kamal Basadi and Chikki Basadi at Belgaum Fort
- Chaturmukha Basadi, Gerusoppa
- Mandaragiri
- Aretippur Jain temple
- Jain Bhattaraka Math at Manyakheta
- Aagam Mandir, Tumkur
- Kamthana Jain temple
- Shri 1008 Adinath Digamber Jin Mandir, Jayanagar, Bangalore
- Shri Mahavira Digambara Jain temple, Chickpet
- Kalya (Kalyana pura)
- Gundwad Jain Basadi
- Kathale Basadi, Barkur
- Sri Parshwanath Swamy Basadi
- Jain temple inside Hangal Fort, Hubli
- Hampi Jain complex
- Padmabbarasi Basadi, Naregal
- Shantinatha Basadi, Kalaghatagi
- Godageri
- Sargur
- Shri Parshwa Sushil Dham, Attibele

=== Kerala ===
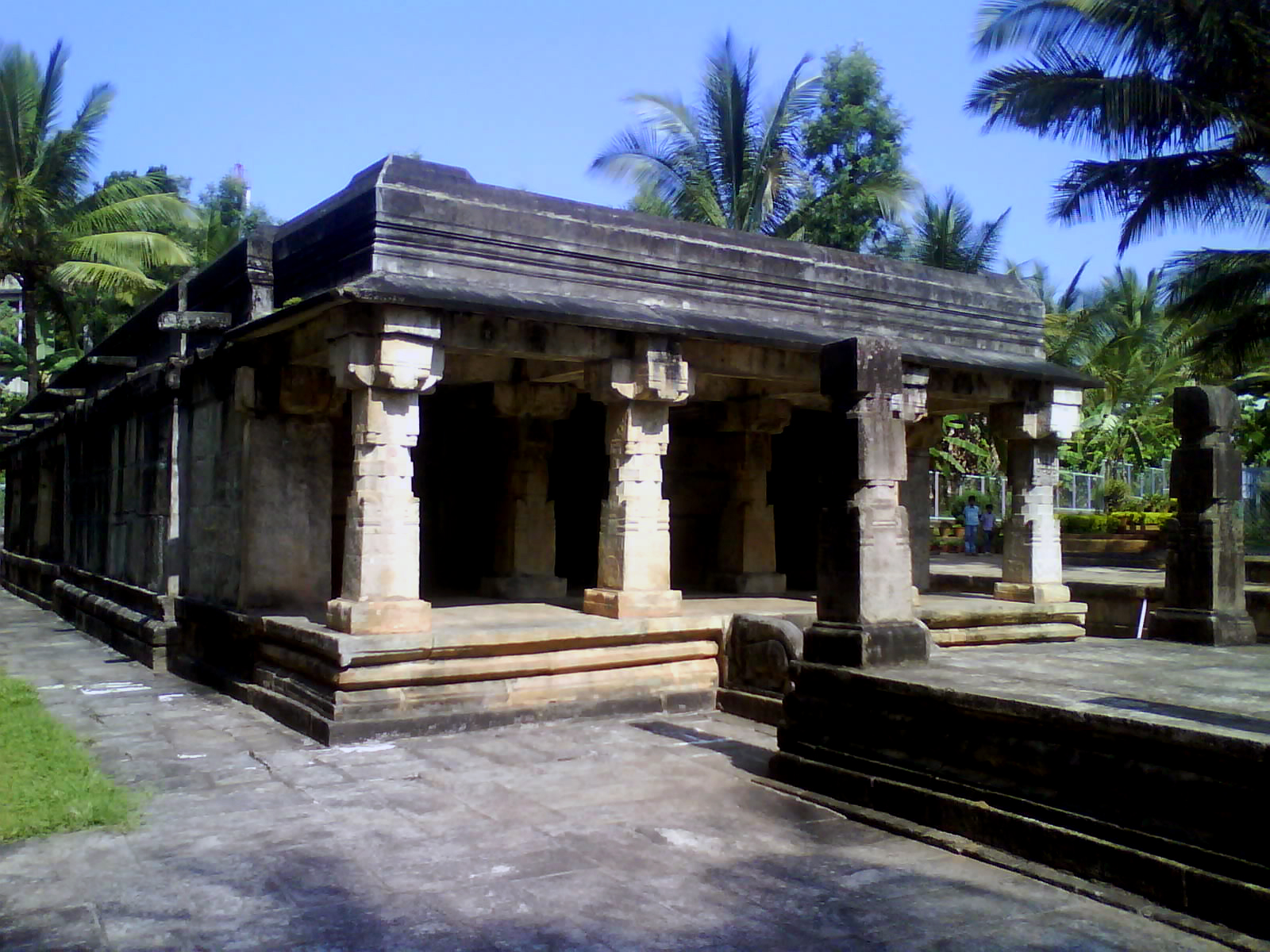
Anantnath Swami Temple

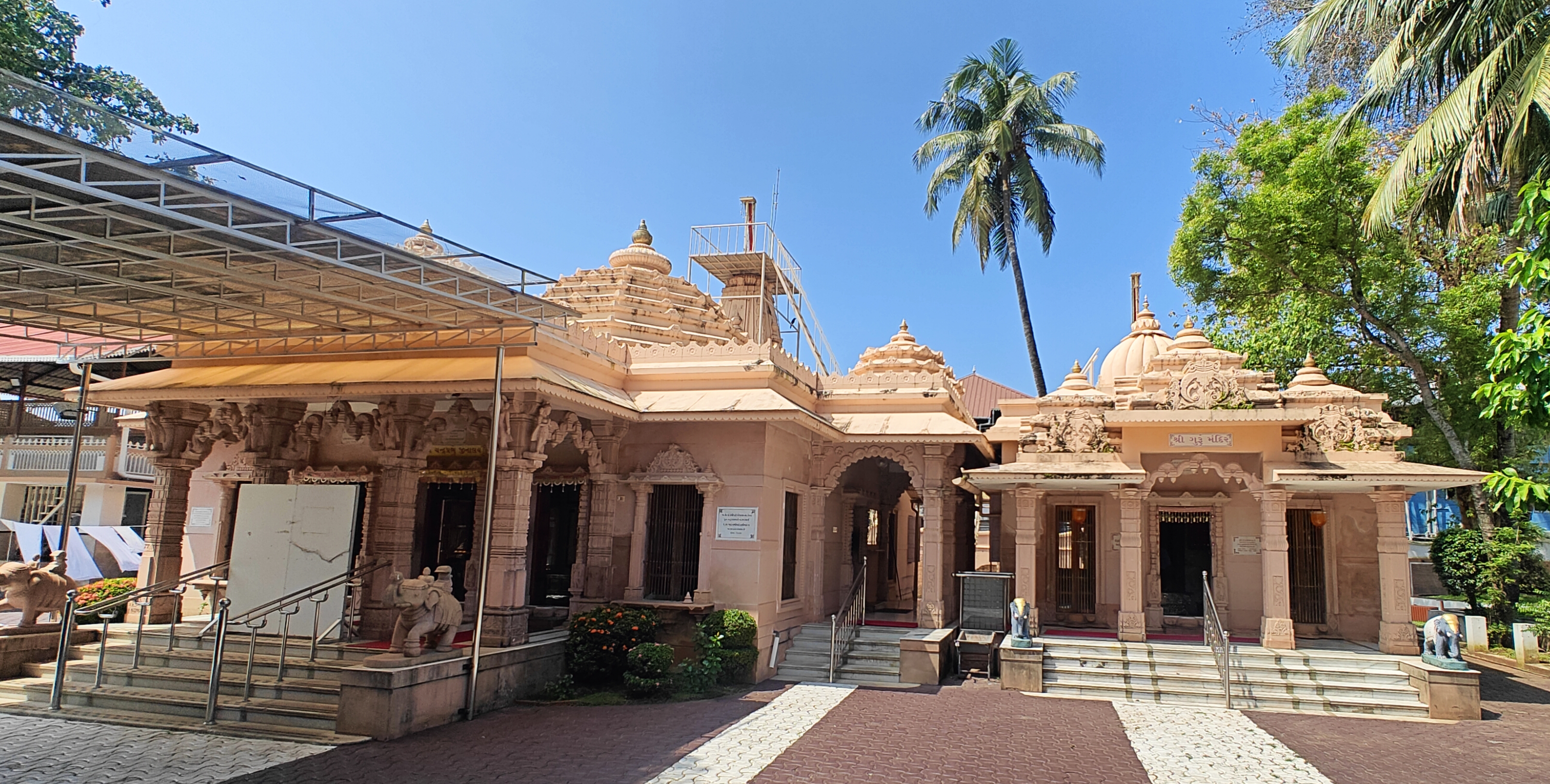
Dharmanath Jain Temple

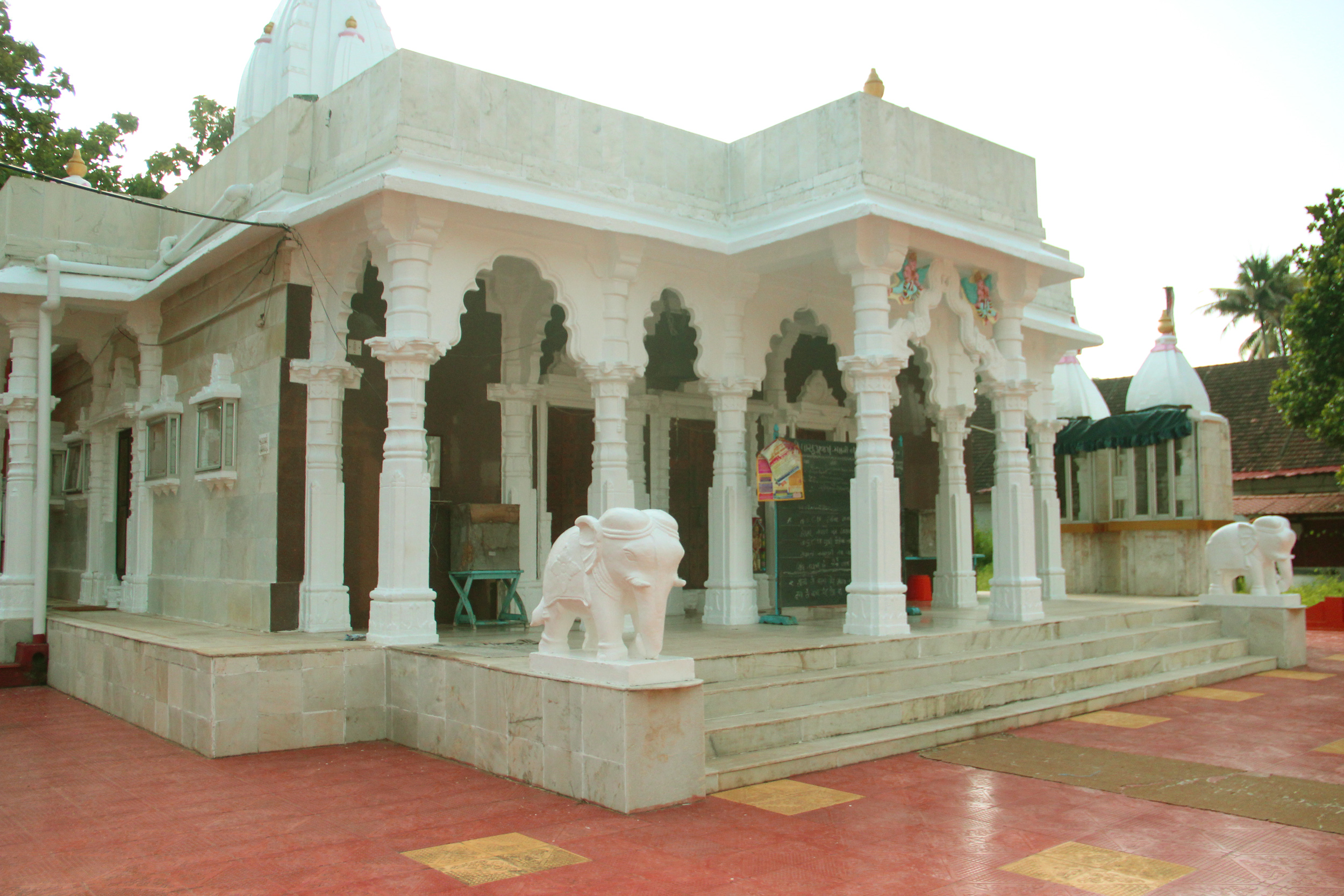
Alleppey Sree Jain Shwethambar Temple

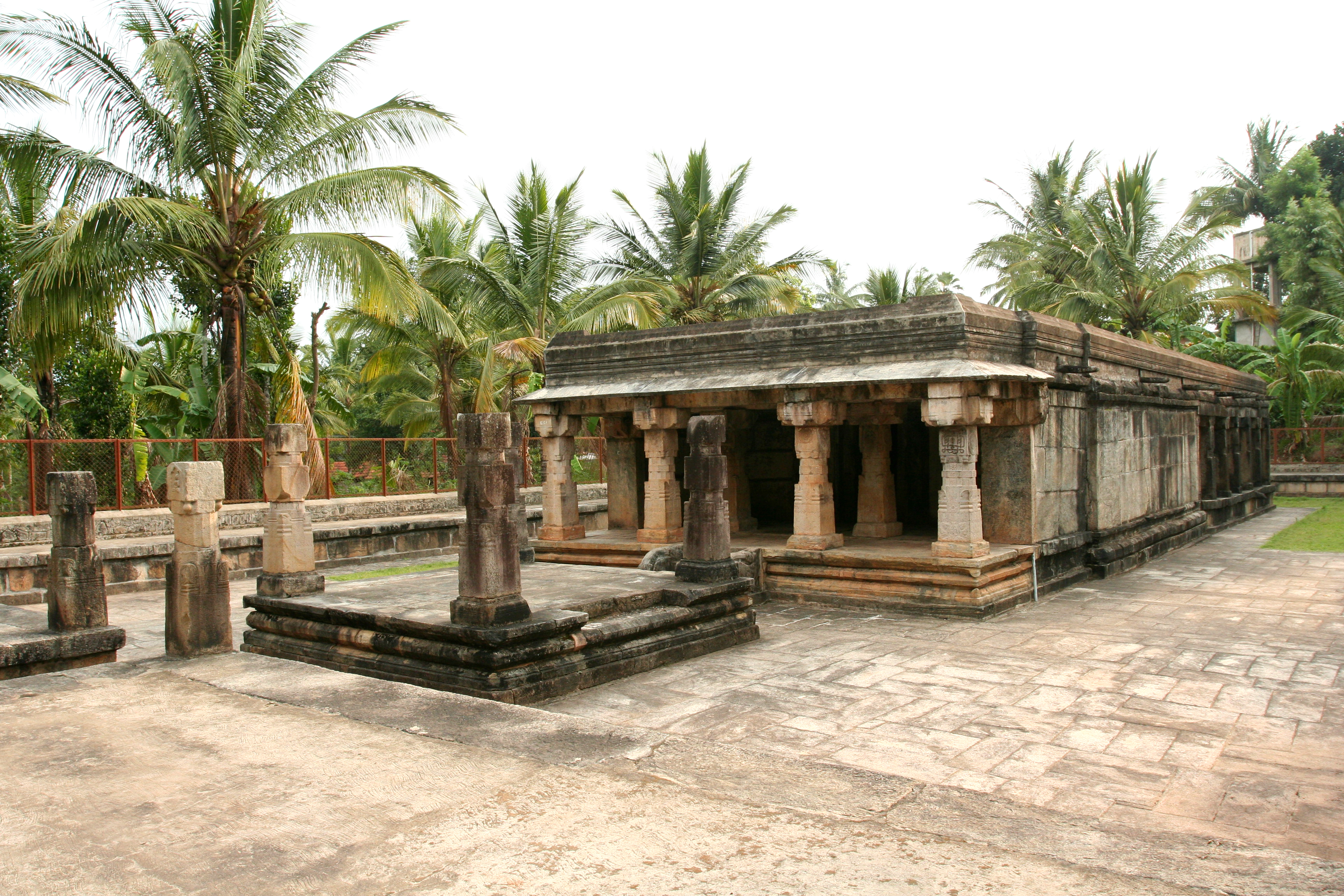
Sultan Bathery Jain Temple

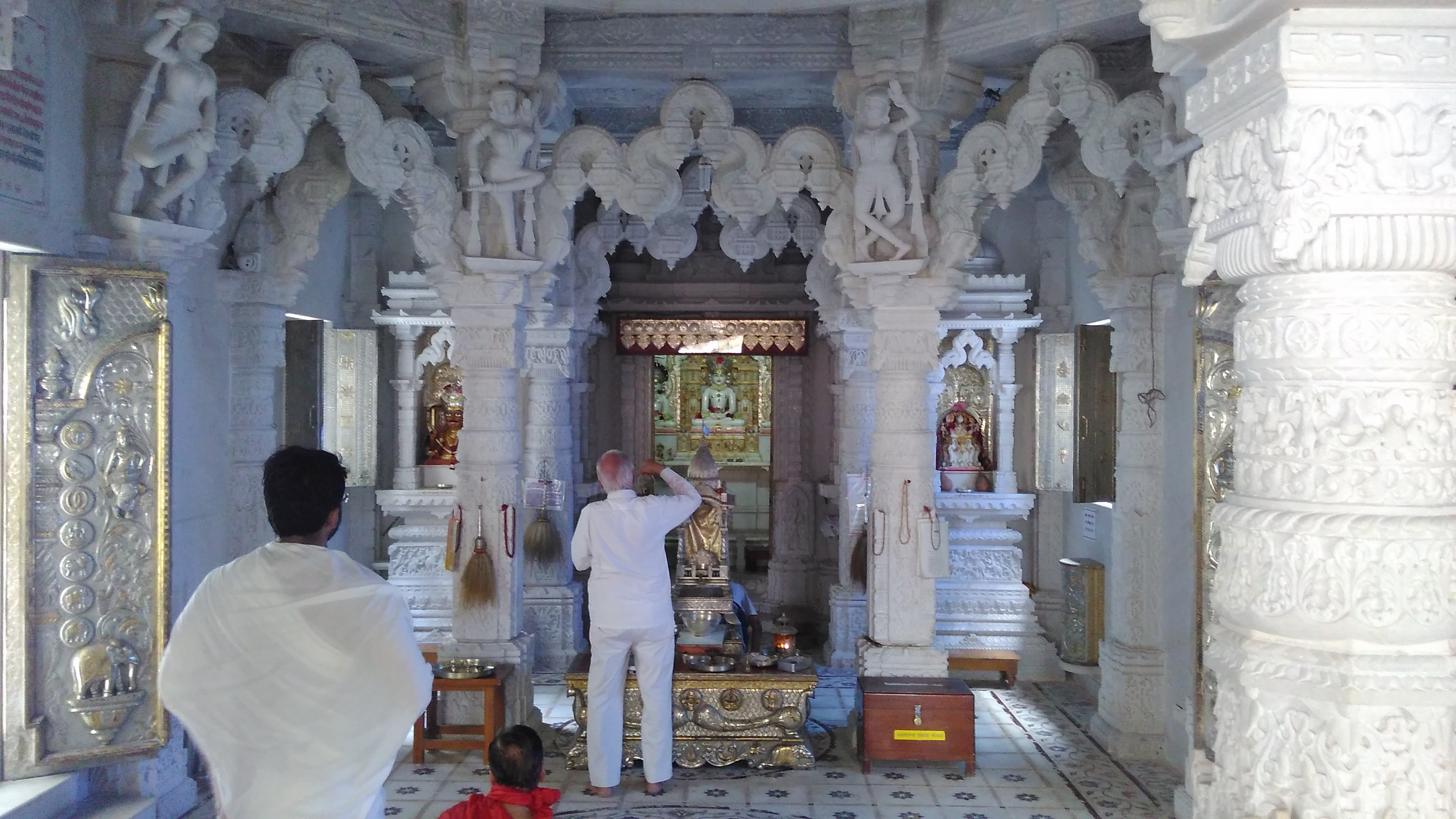
Shri Vasupujya Swami Jain Temple

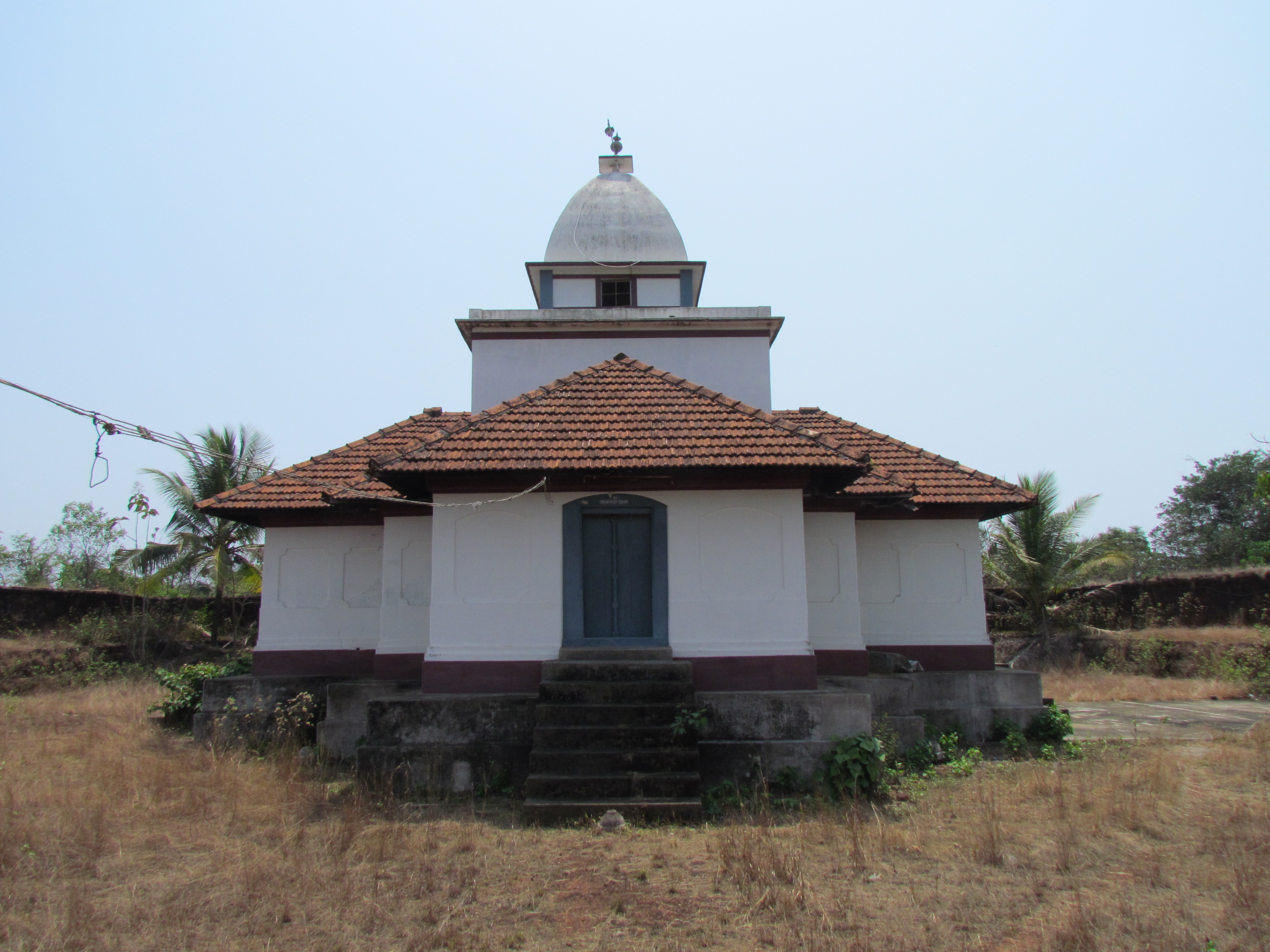
Chathurmukha Basati, Manjeshwar

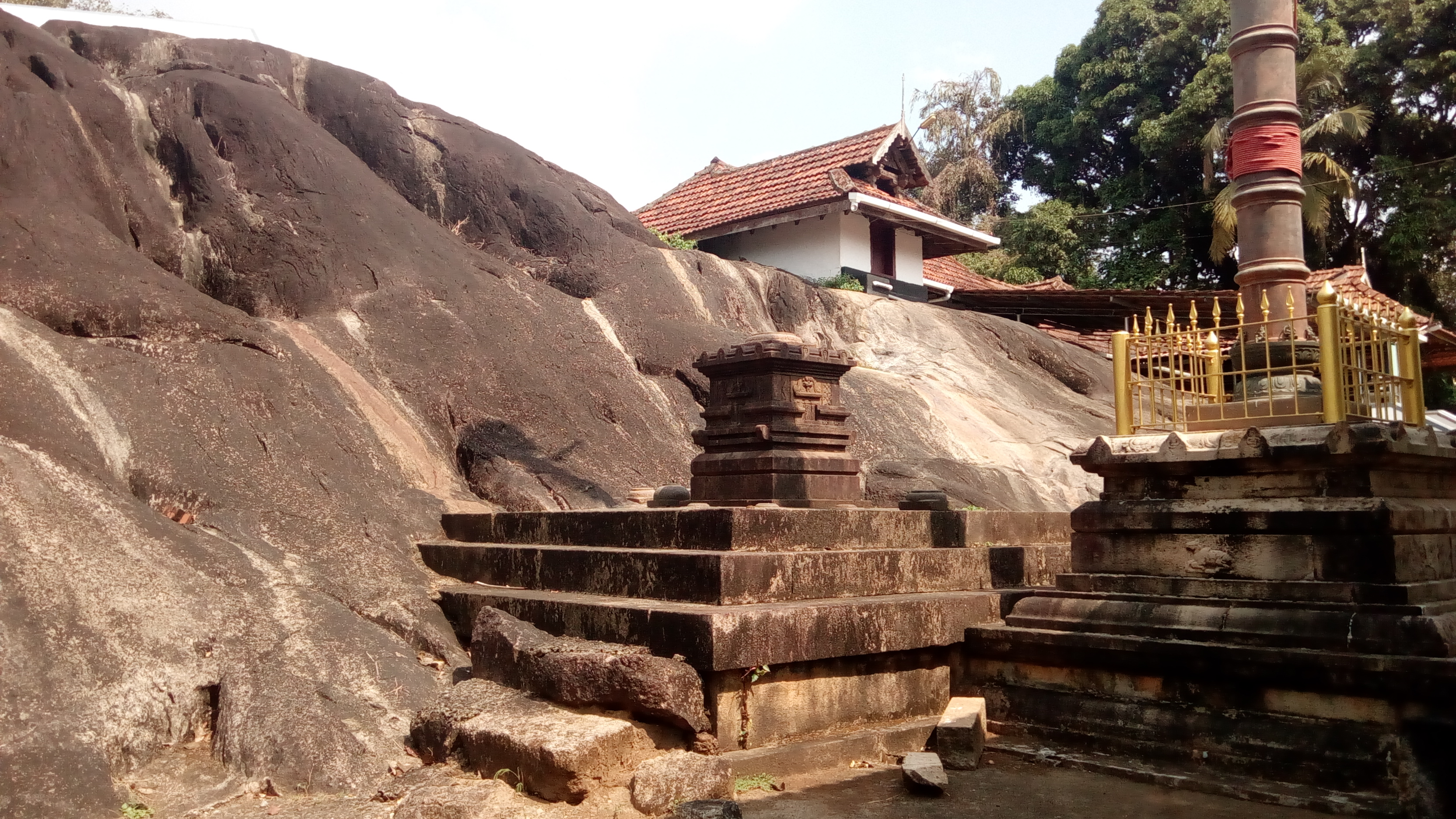
Trikkur Jain Cliff
- Anantnath Swami Temple
- Jain temple, Alleppey
- Jainimedu Jain temple, Palakkad.
- Kallil Temple in Angamaly, Ernakulam.
- Kattil Madam Temple
- Sultan Bathery Jain Temple, Wayanad
- Chathurmukha Basati and Parswanatha Basati, Manjeshwar
- Shri Mahaveer Swami Digambar Jain Temple, Panambilli Nagar, Ernakulam

=== Madhya Pradesh ===
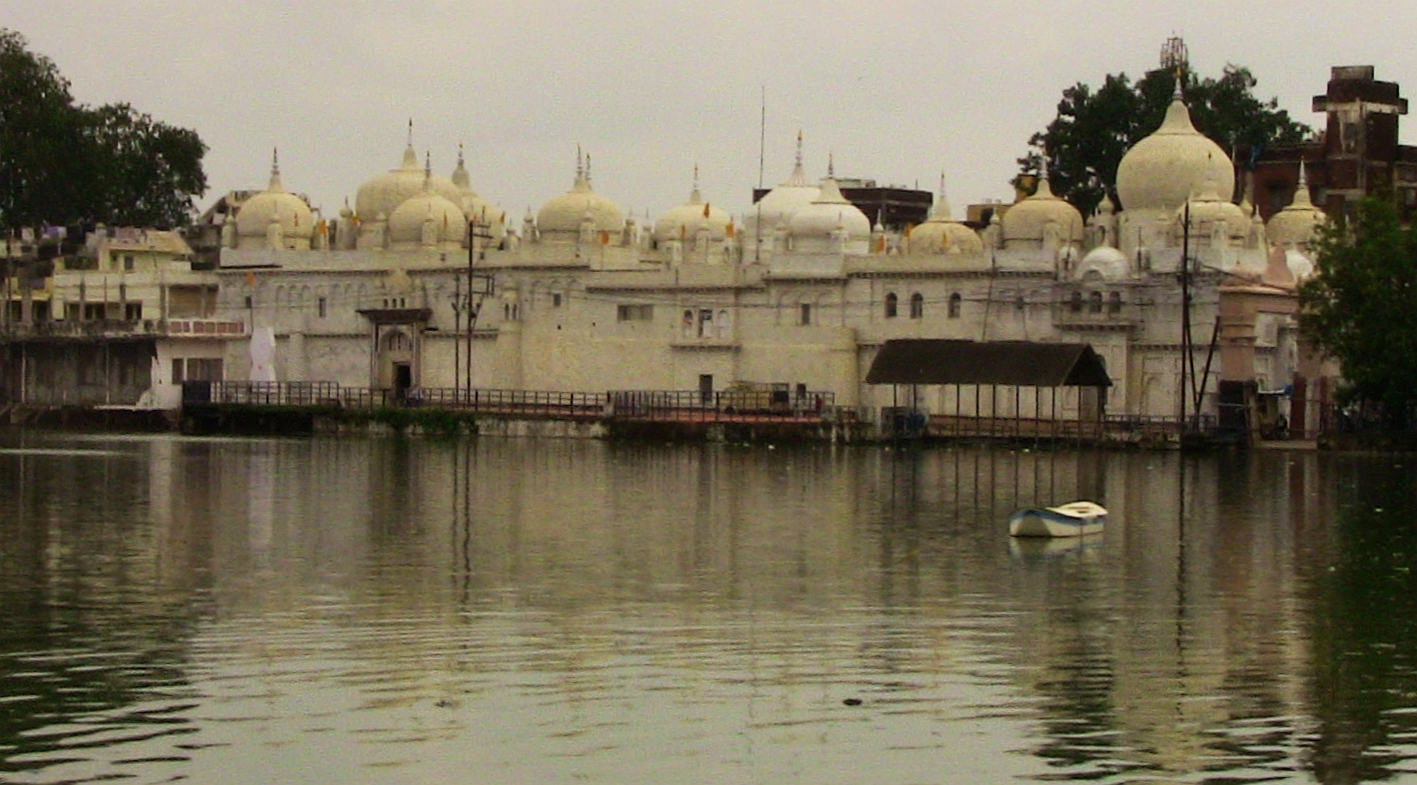
Hanumantal Bada Jain Mandir

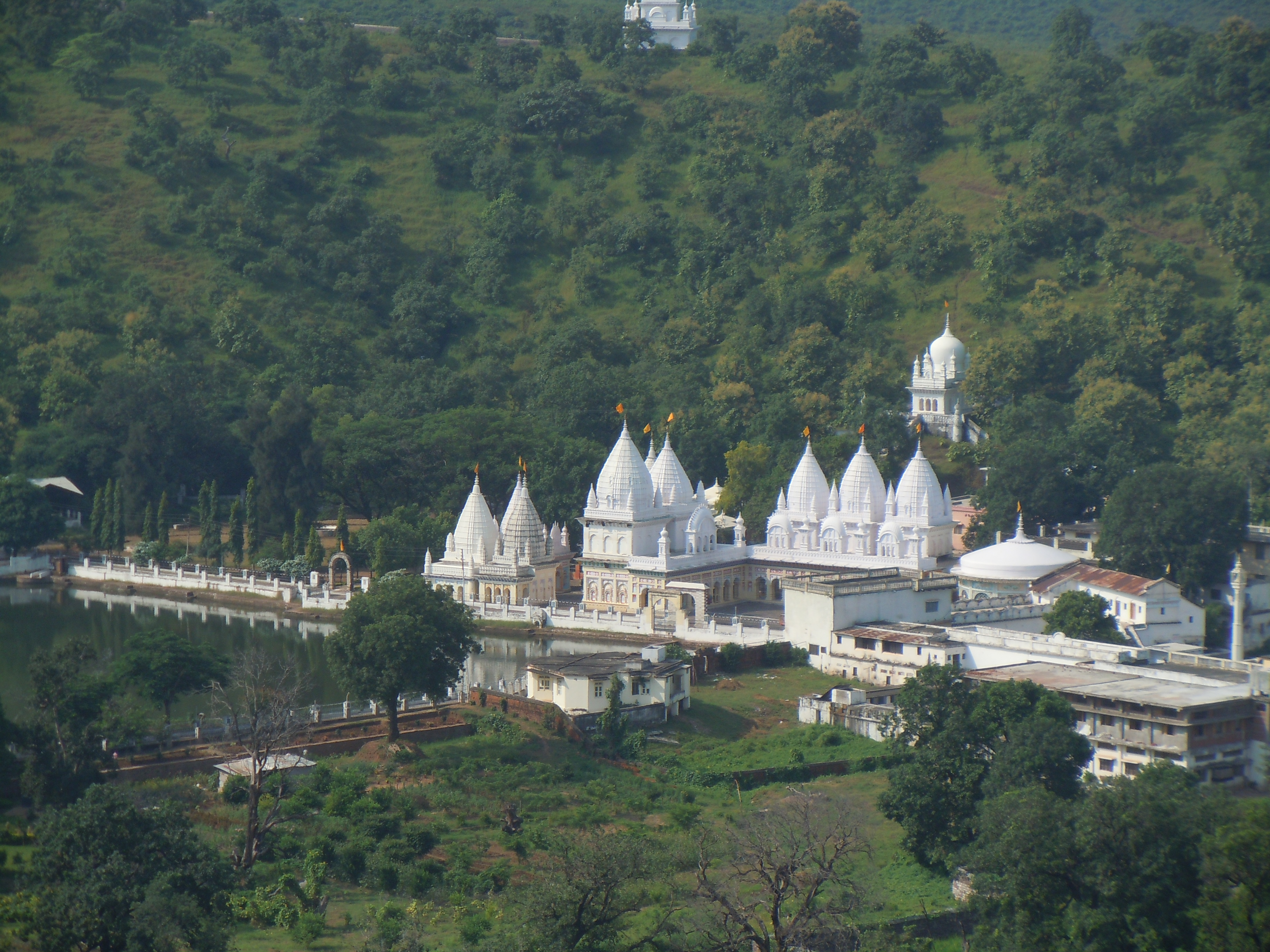
Kundalpur tirth

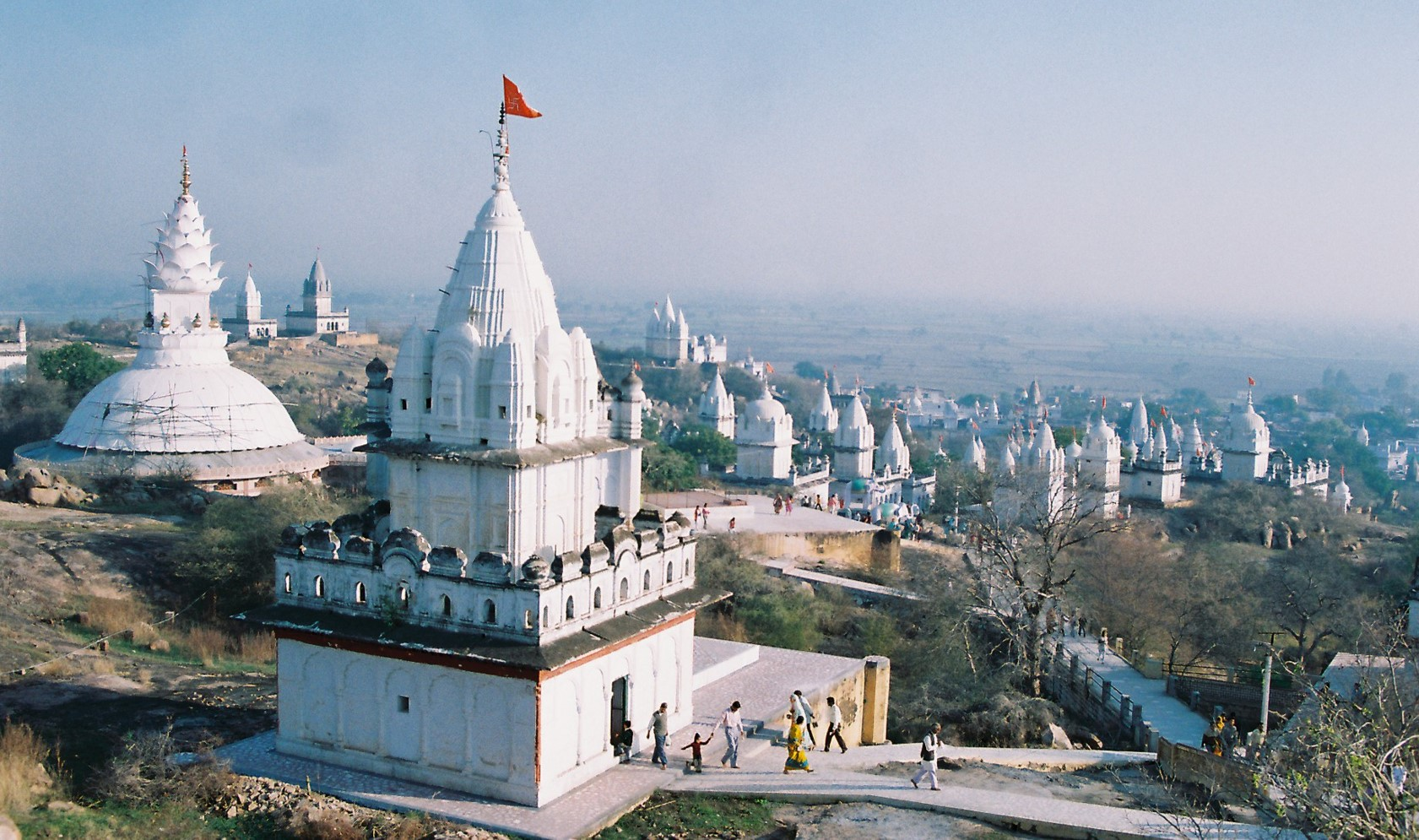
Sonagiri

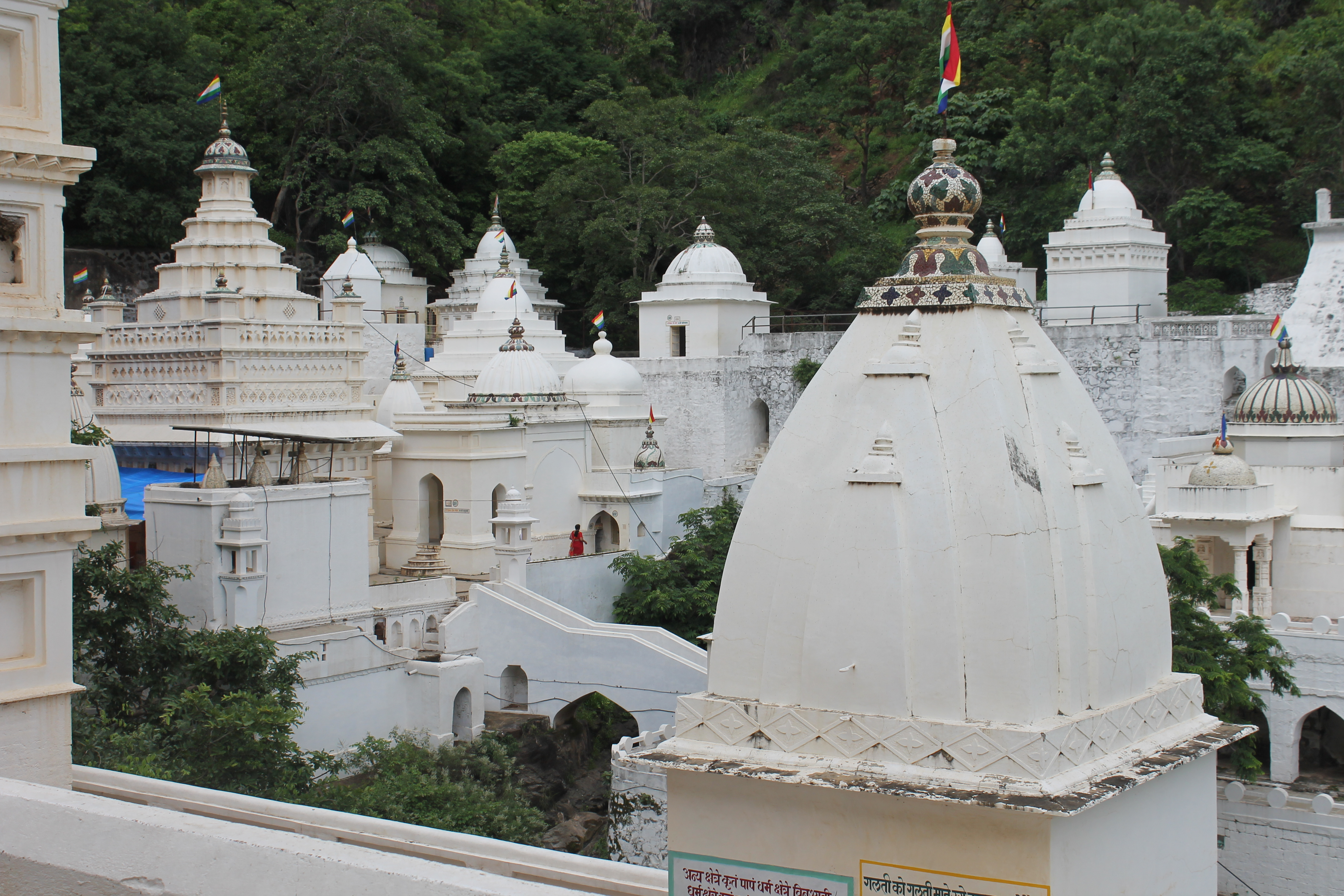
Muktagiri

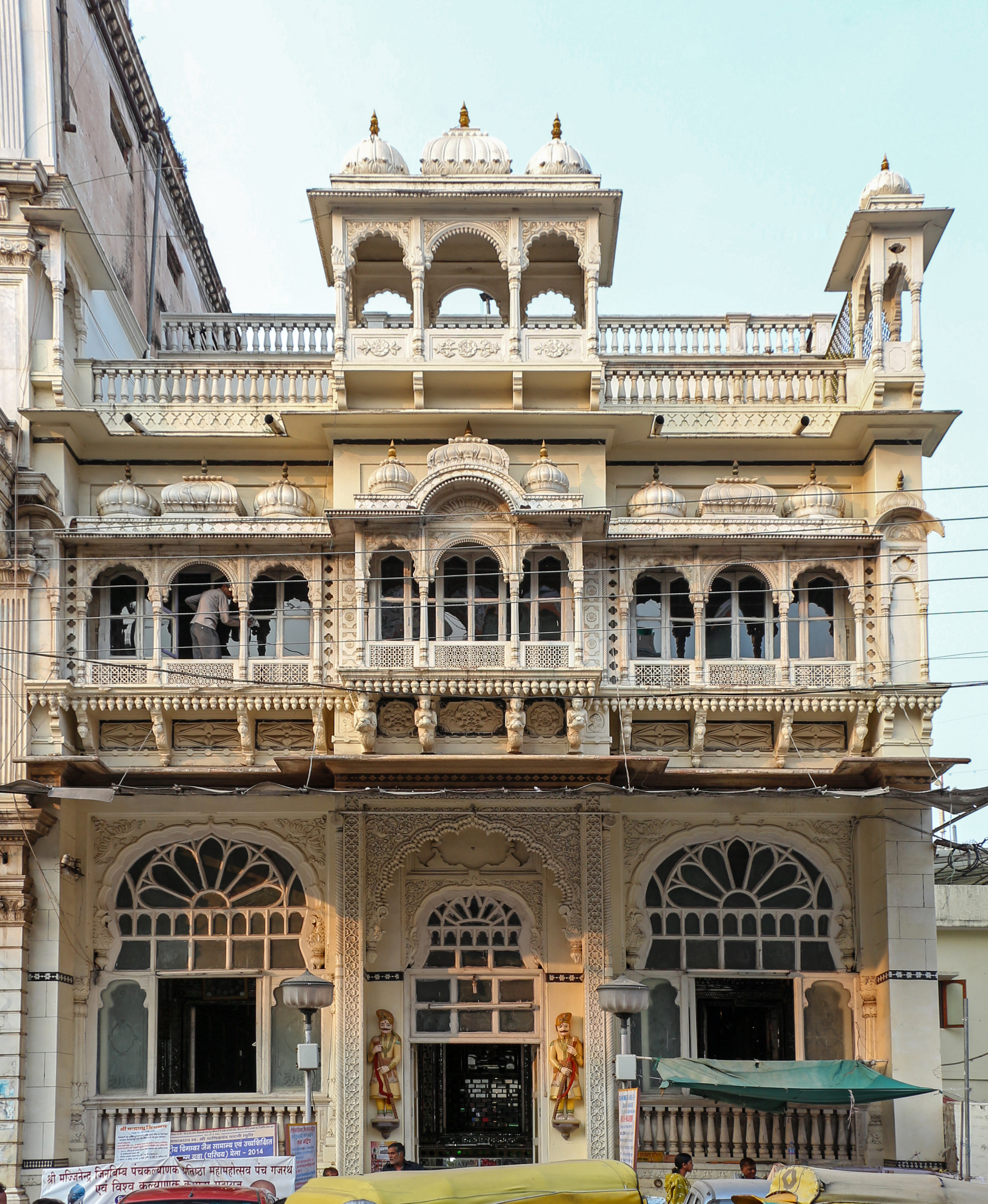
Kanch Mandir, Indore

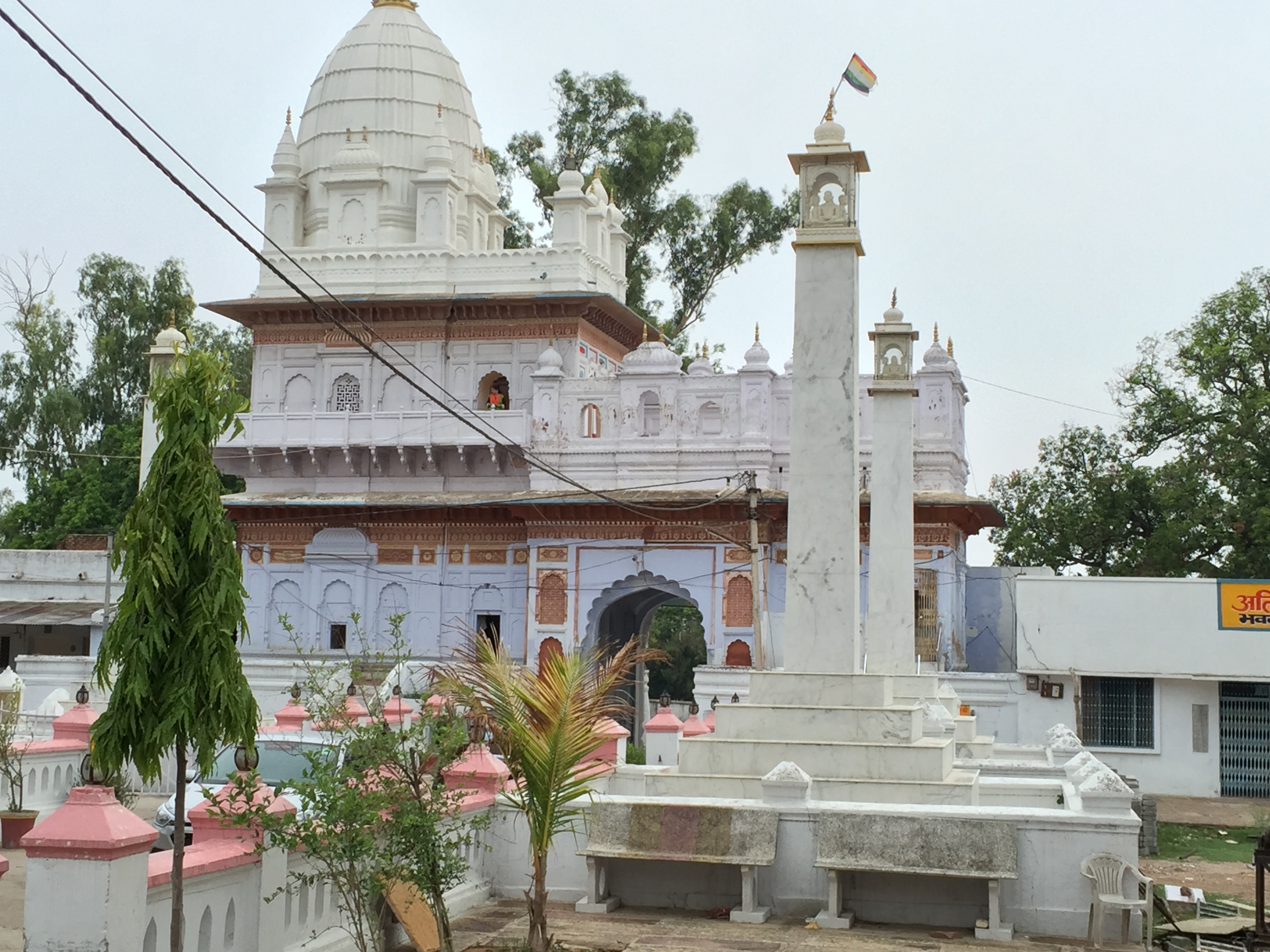
Paporaji

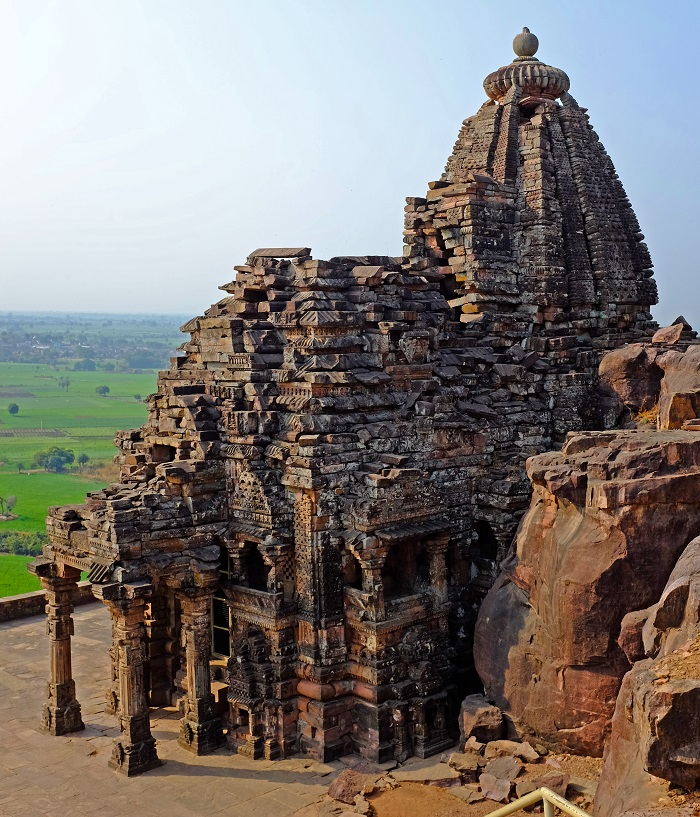
Maladevi temple

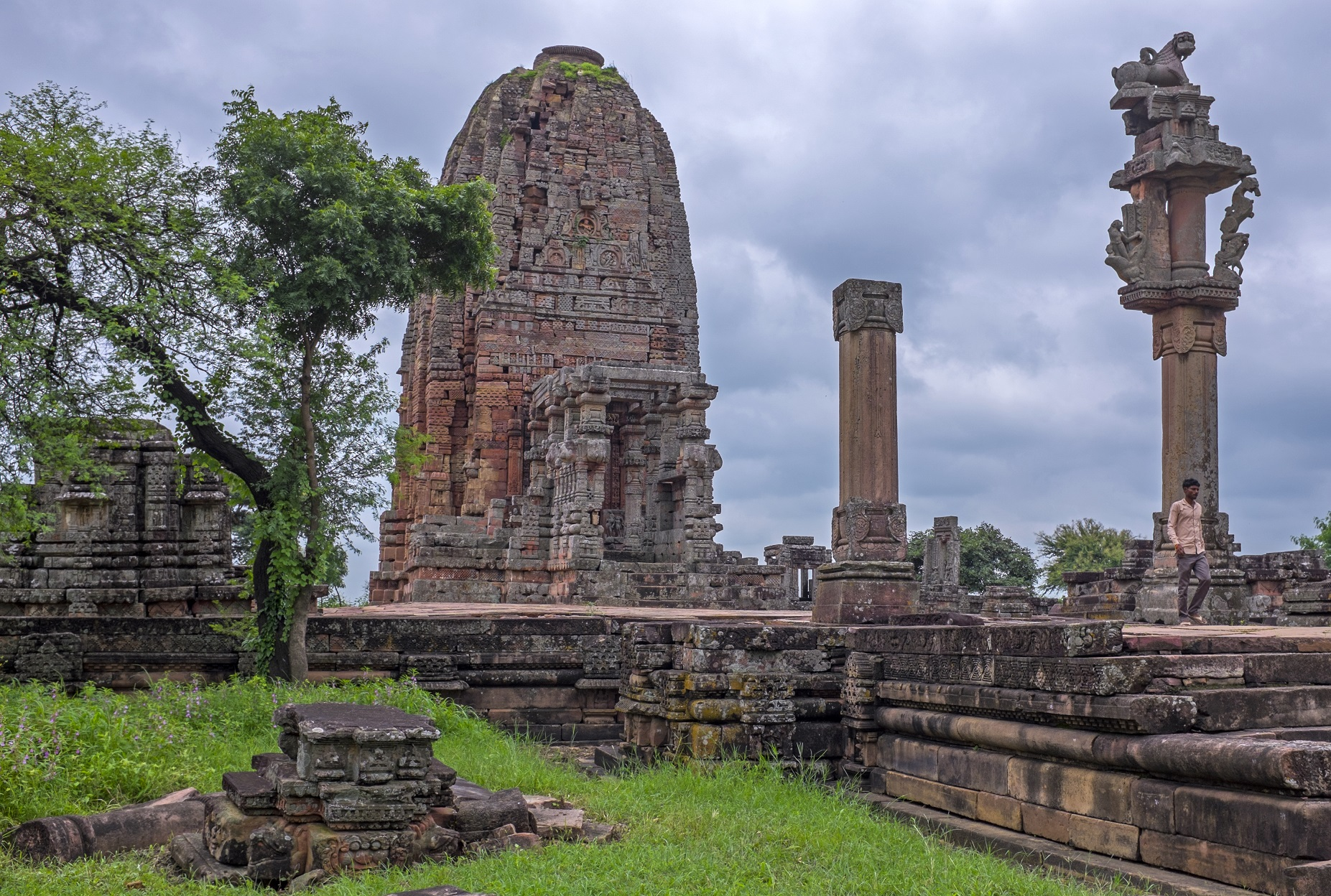
Gadarmal temple

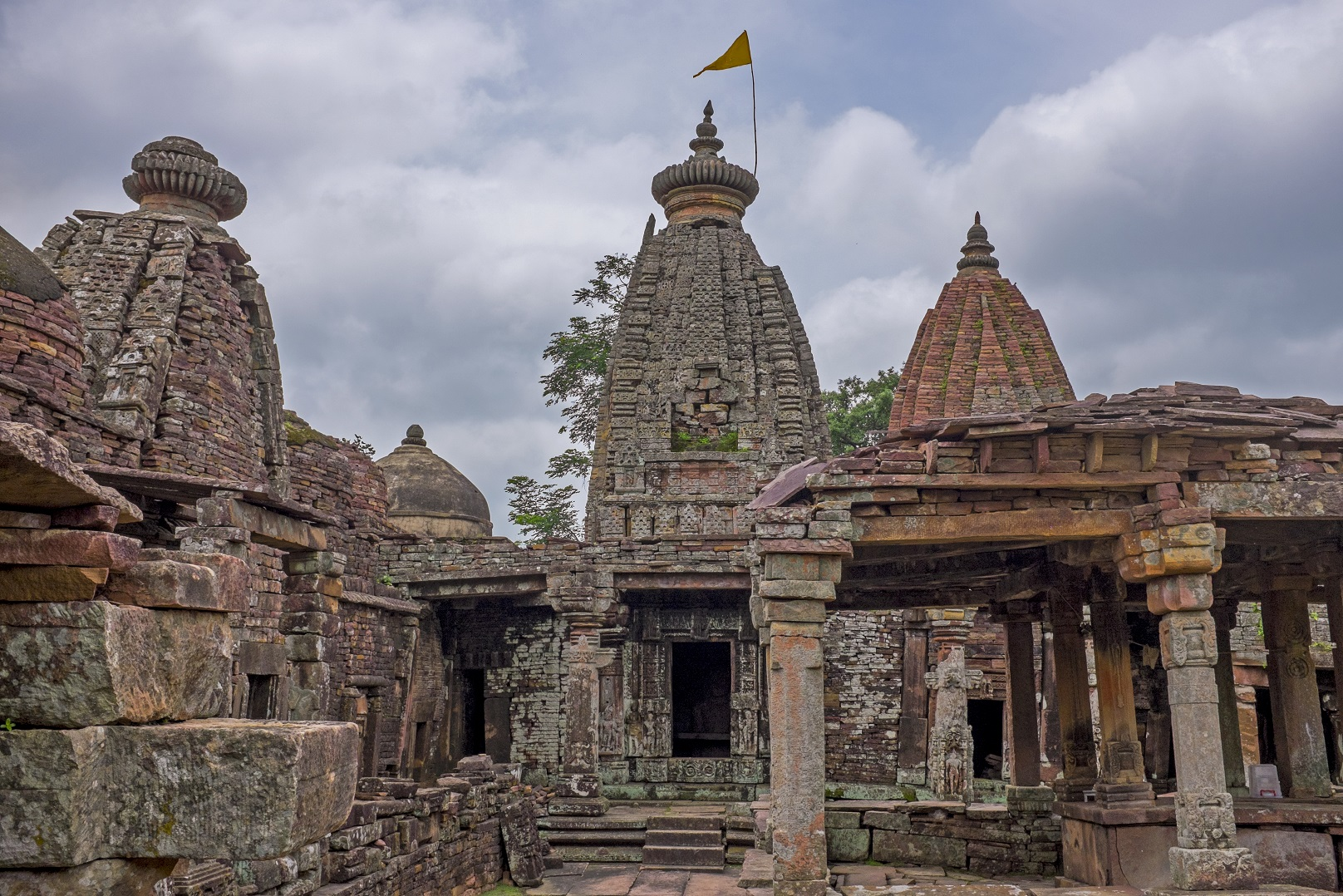
Pathari Jain temples

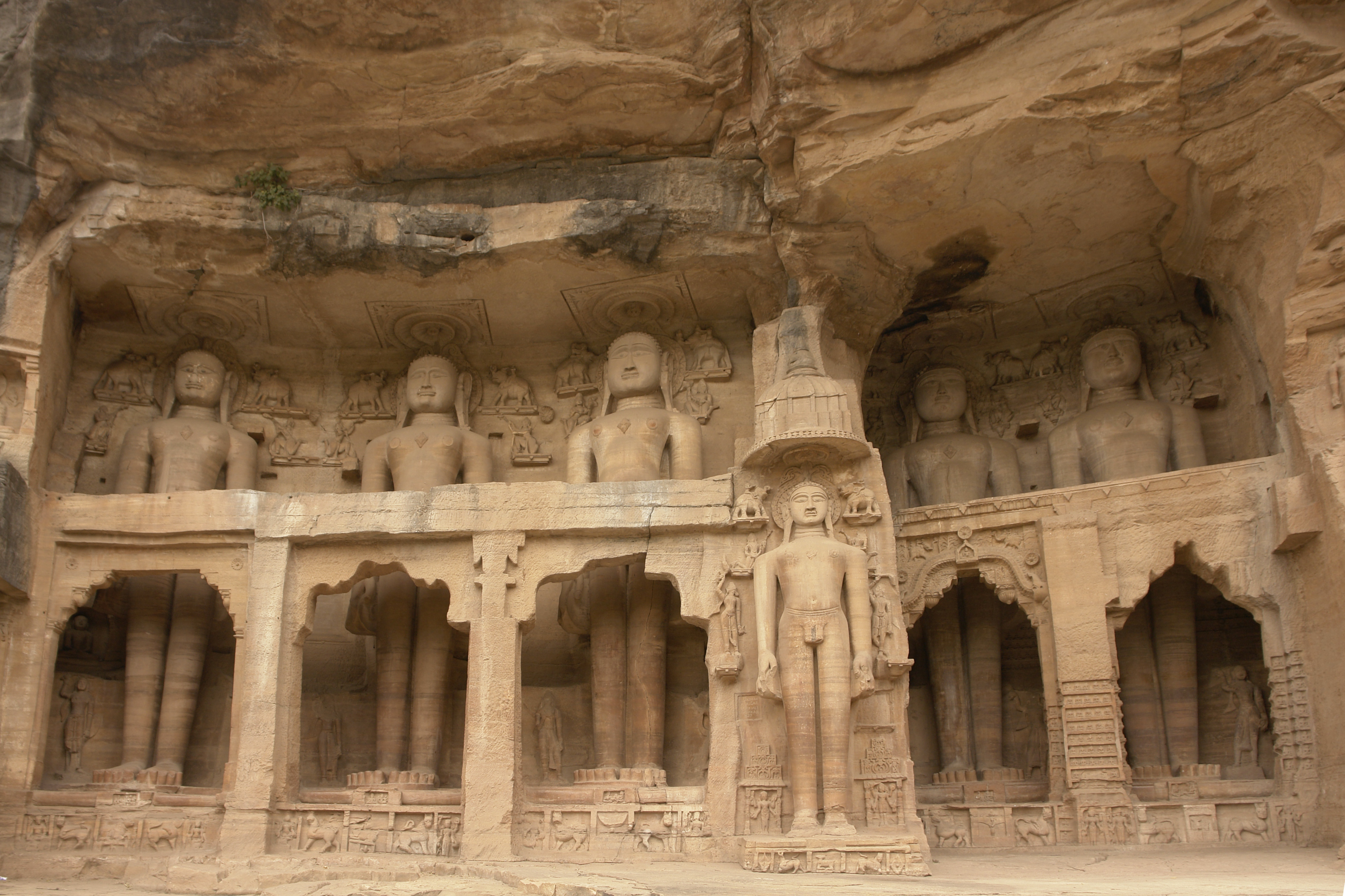
Rock carved Jain statues at Siddhachal Caves inside Gwalior Fort

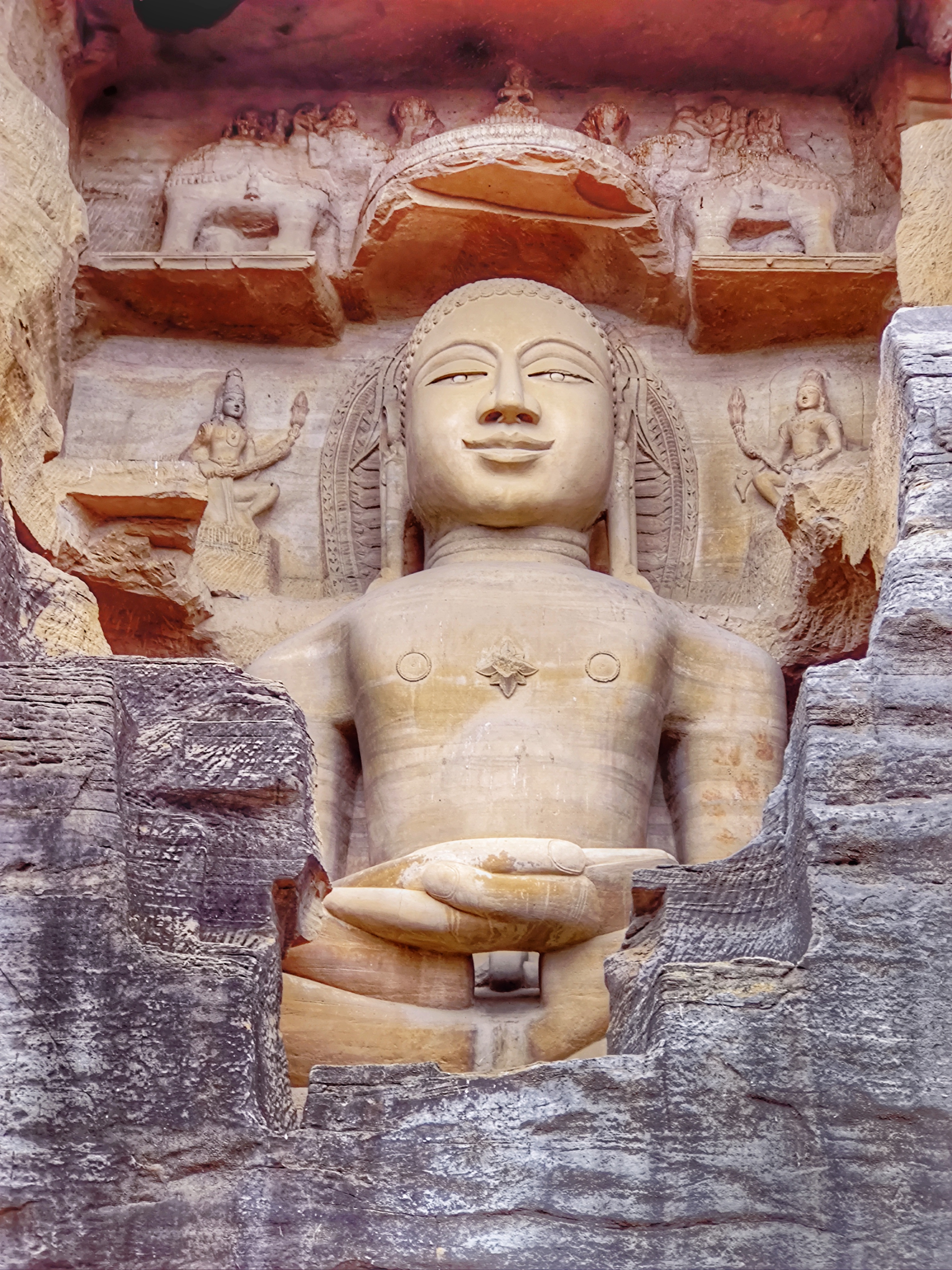
Tirthankar statue at Gopachal

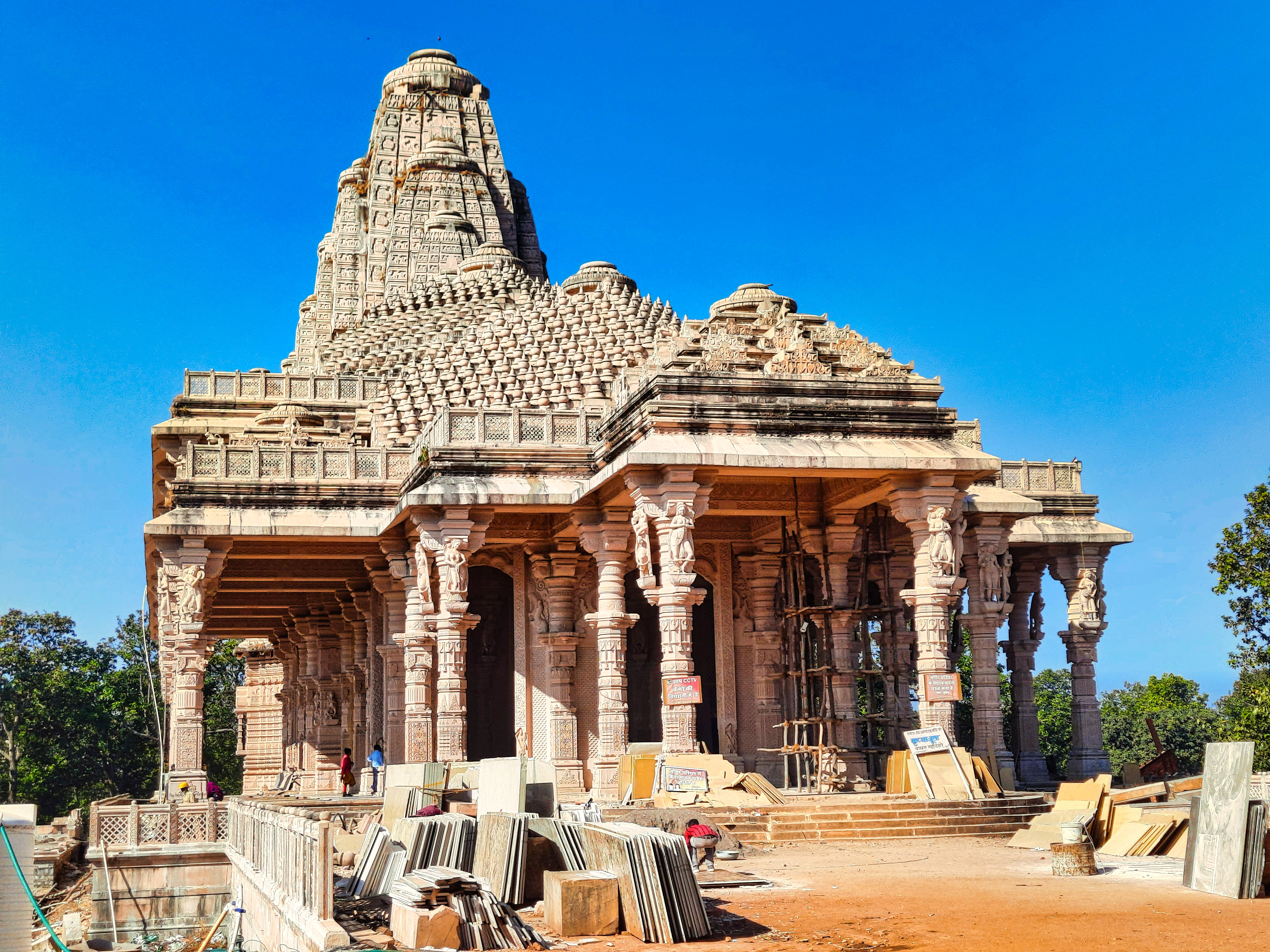
Sarvodaya Jain temple

Caves

- Siddhachal Caves of Gwalior Fort is home to dozens of historical large size Jain rock-cut sculptures.
- Gopachal Hill
- Udayagiri Caves
- Khandargiri Jain caves

Temples

- Kundalpur – including Bade Baba Temple
- Jain temples of Khajuraho – Parshvanatha temple, Adinatha temple, Shantinatha temple, and Ghantai temple
- Sonagiri
- Muktagiri
- Hanumantal Bada Jain Mandir, Jabalpur
- Bawangaja
- Kanch Mandir in Indore
- Jain temples, Vidisha – Pathari Jain temples, Bajramath temple, Maladevi temple, Gadarmal Devi Temple, Bada Mandir
- Pataini temple
- Paporaji, Tikamgarh District
- Pateriaji, Sagar District
- Bandhaji
- Mohankheda Tirth, Dhar
- Aharji Jain Teerth
- Nainagiri
- Ajaigarh
- Golakot Jain temple
- Sarvodaya Jain temple, Amarkantak
- Pisanhari ki Marhia
- Pavagiri Tirth and Chaubara Dera, Oon, Khargone
- Semliya
- Shreyansh Giri
- Digambar Jain Siddhakshetra, Falhodi Badagaon
- Jain temple complex, Chanderi – Choubeesee Bara Mandir, Khandargiri Jain caves, Thobonji Jain temple, Chandraprabha Digambar Jain temple
- Shree Vimalnath Bhagwan Tirth in Dhule
- Mahavir Jain Temple and Digambar Jain Parasnath Jinalaya, Bhind
- Bahuriband
- Sri Mandavgadh Jain Tirth, Mandu, Madhya Pradesh
- Dayasagar Ji Mararaj Nemingar Jain Tirth, Sagar
- Beenaji, Sagar
- Sihoniya Ambikā Devī Temple, Morena
- Maksi Jain temple
- Bhojpur Jain Temple
- Temples in Jalore Fort
- Shri Adinath Keshwarna Jain Temple
- Gommat Giri, Indore
- Nemavar Digambar Jain Temple, Dewas
- Bandha ji Digambar Jain Atishay Kshetra, Tikamgarh
- Baraso Ji Digambar Jain Temple, Bhind
- Pachrai Digambar Jain Atishay Kshetra, Shivpuri

=== Maharashtra ===
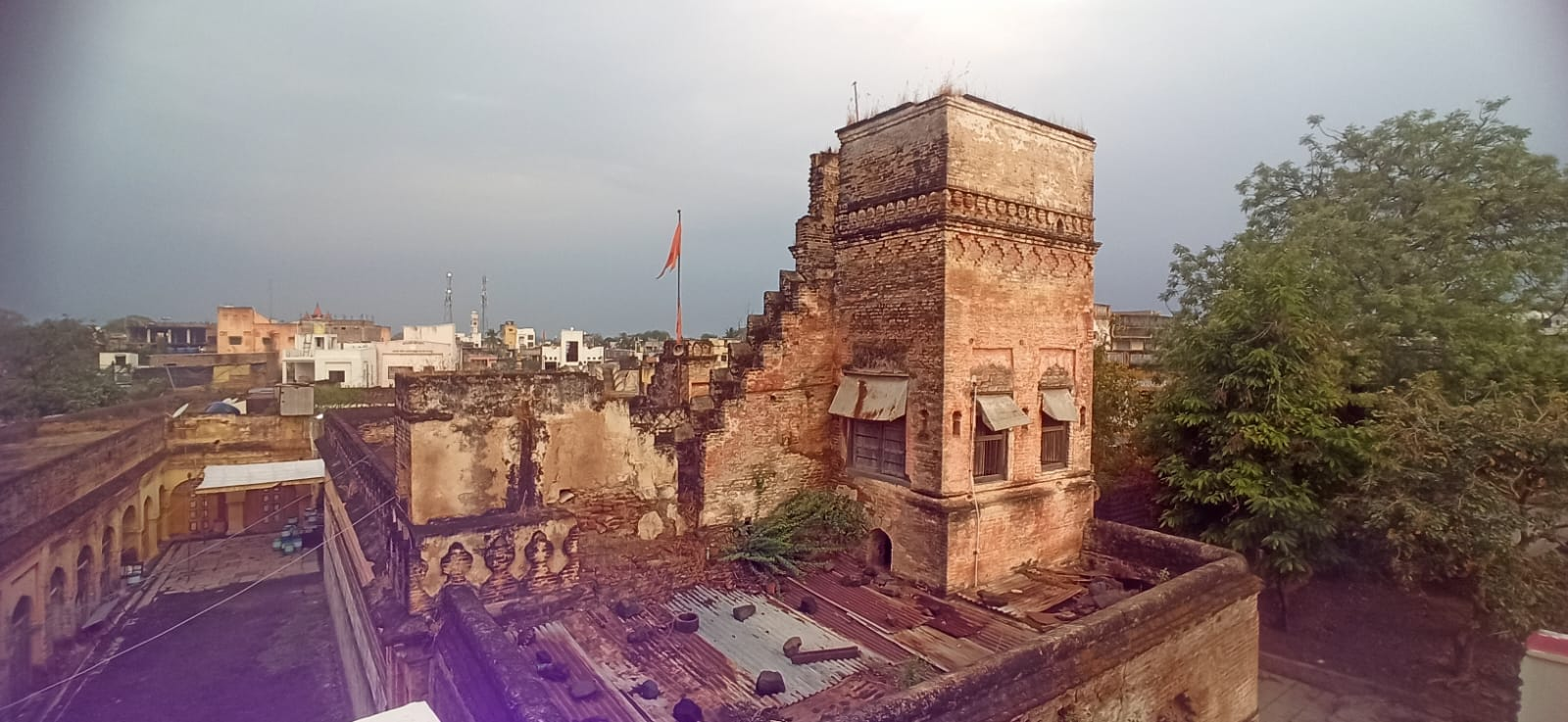
Antarikṣa Pārśvanātha Tīrtha at Shirpur, Washim, Akola district

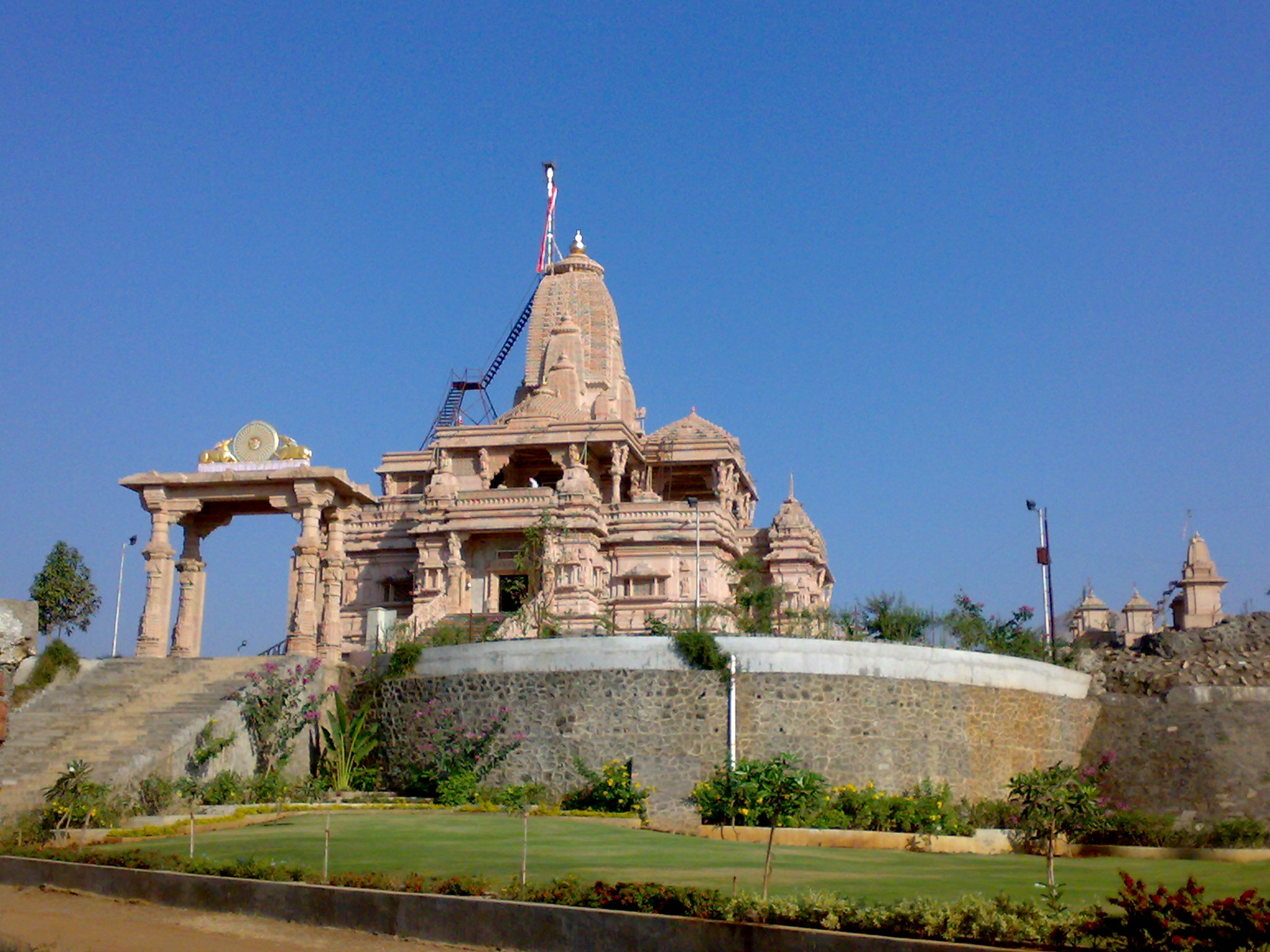
Shree Dharmachakra Prabhav Tirth at Gajpanth

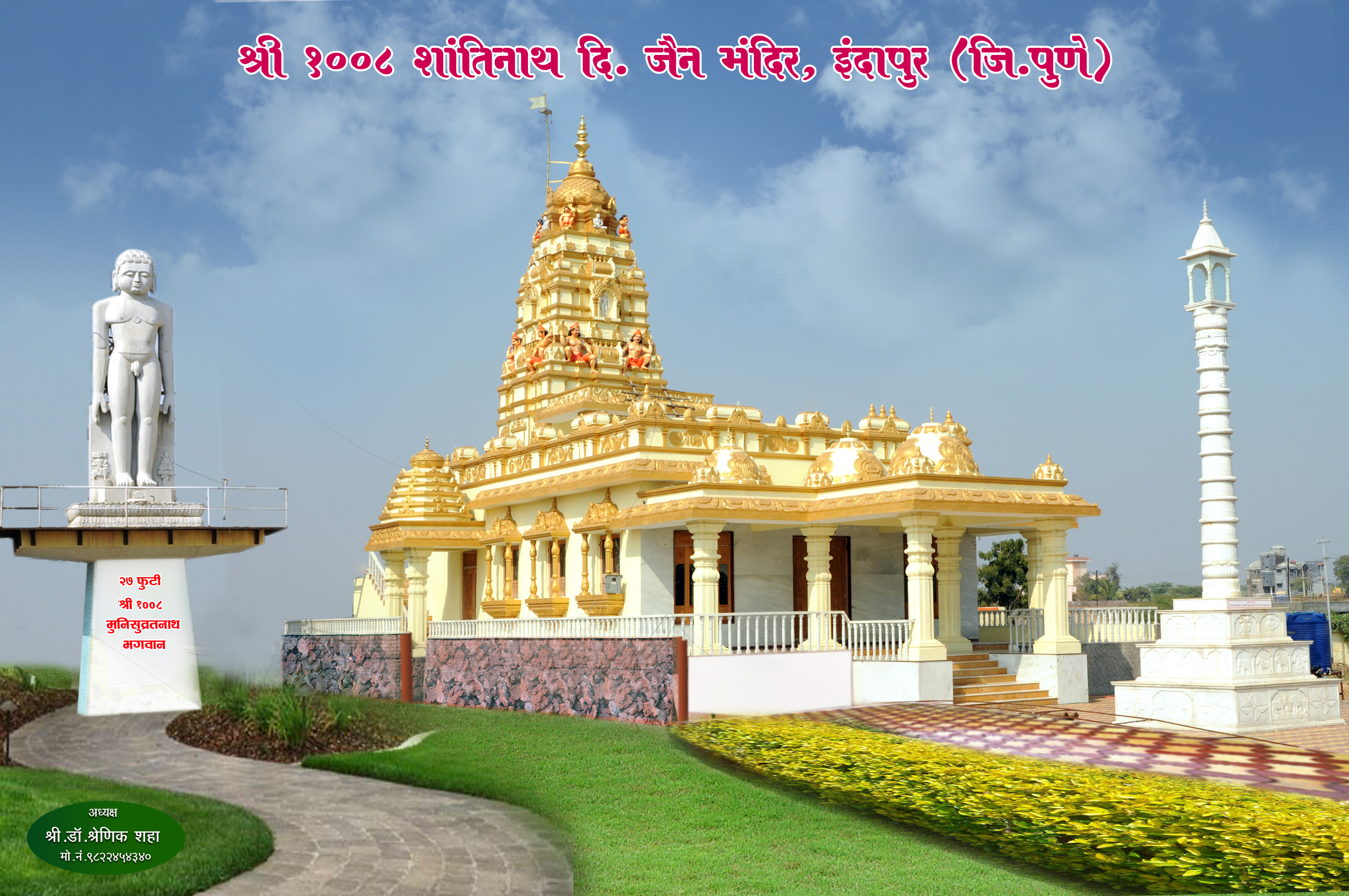
Shantinath Jain Teerth

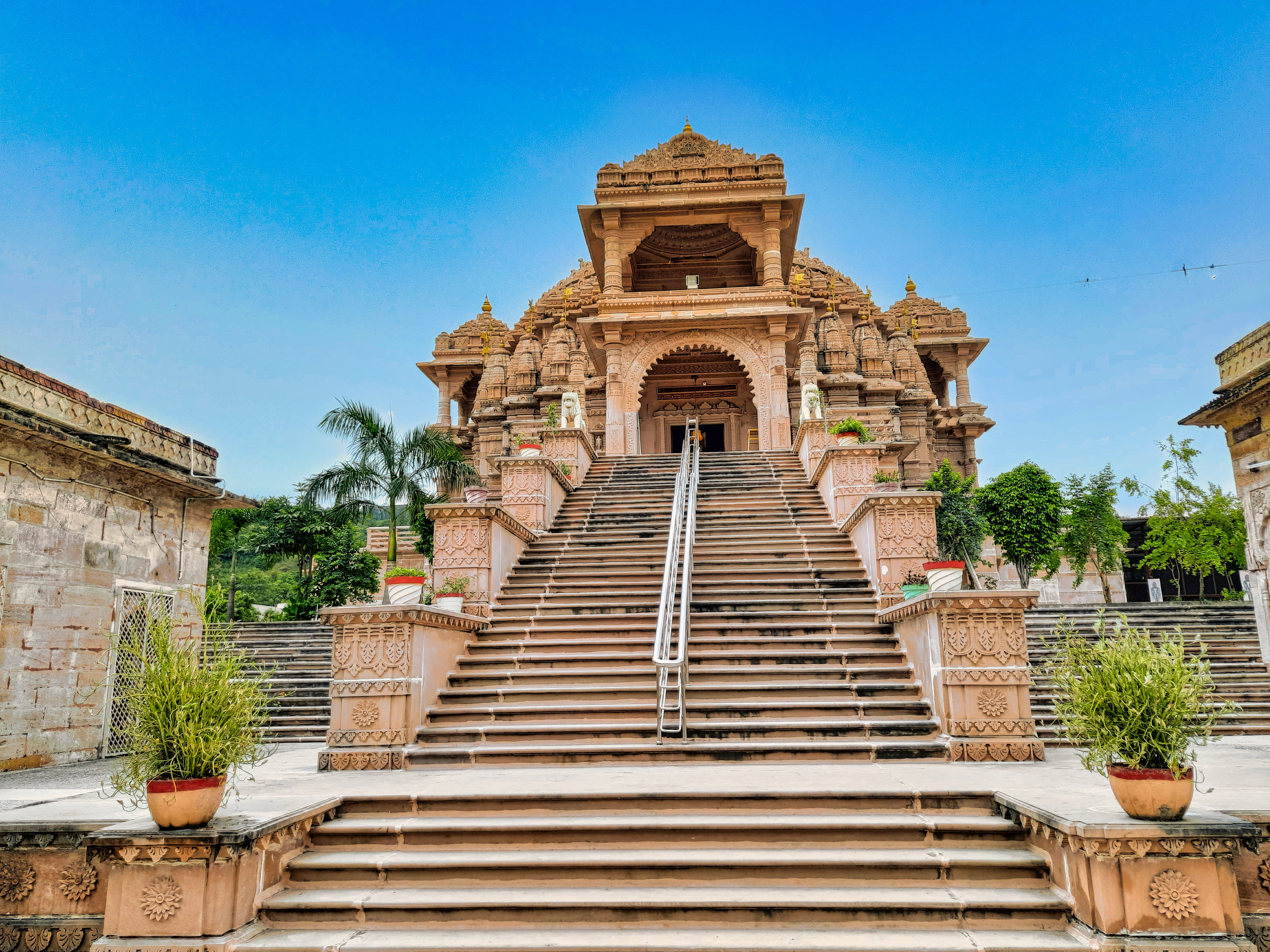
Ramtek Jain temple

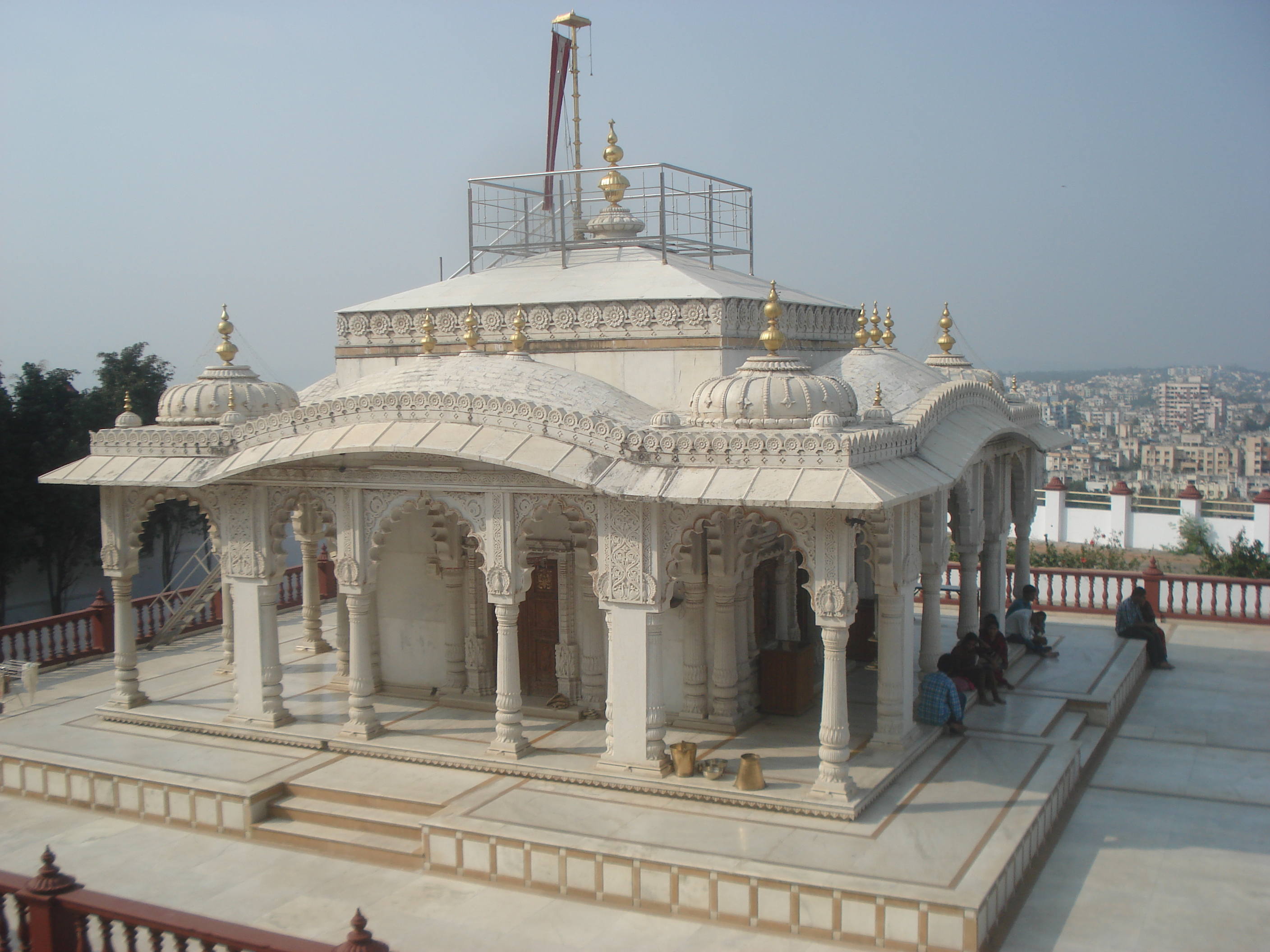
Jain Pavapuri Jal Mandir in Katraj

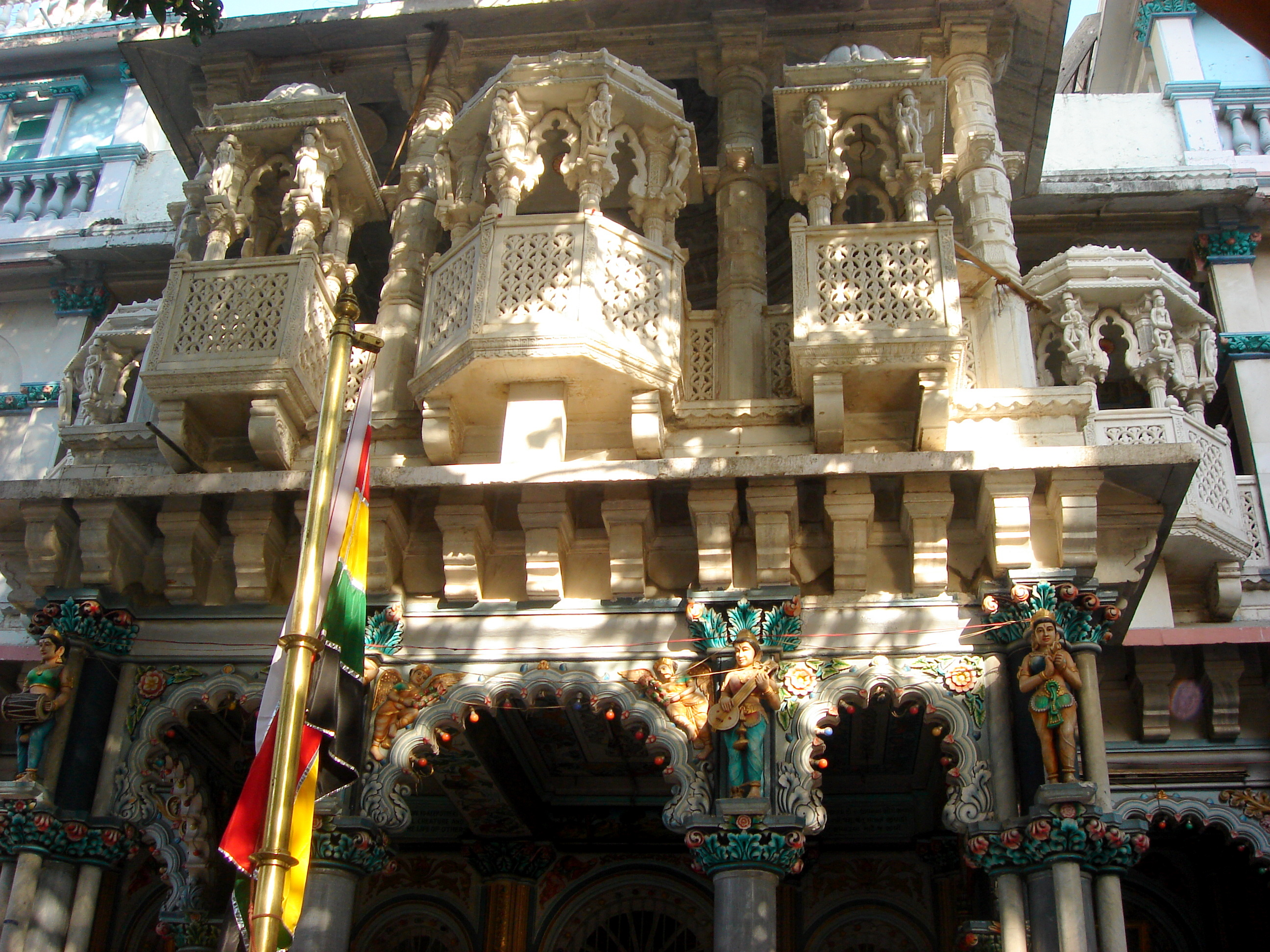
Walkeshwar Jain temple

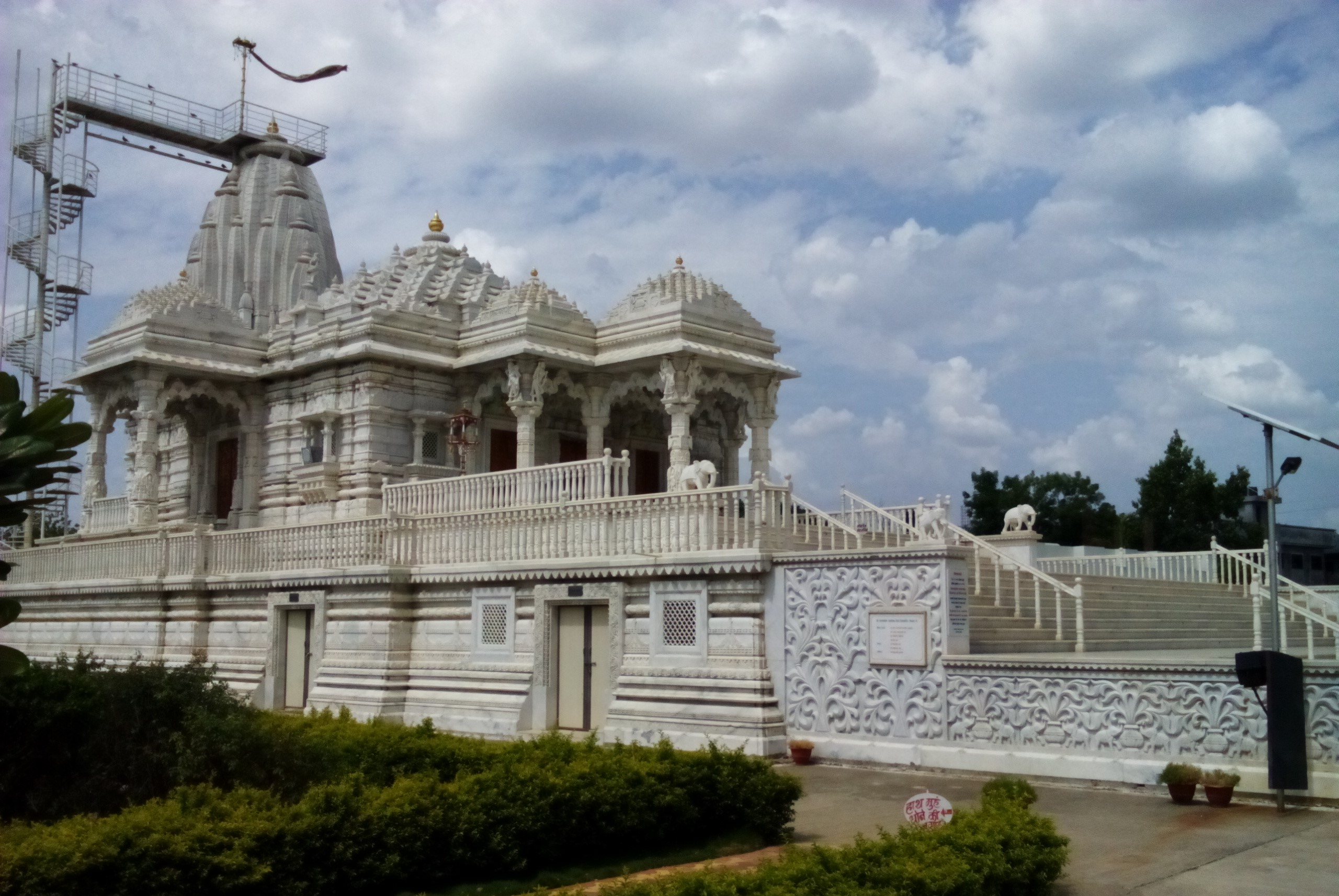
Dadabadi, Jalgaon

Cave temple

- Ellora Jain Caves
- Nasik Caves
- Manmodi Caves
- Mangi-Tungi
- Tringalwadi Jain Cave
- Pale Jain cave
- Lohagadwadi caves
- Ankai Jain cave

Main temple

- Shantinath Jain Teerth
- Gajpanth
- Kumbhoj Jain temple, Kumbhoj
- Jintur
- Godiji
- Nemgiri
- Katraj Tirth
- Babu Amichand Panalal Adishwarji Jain Temple, Walkeshwar
- Shantinatha temple, Ramtek
- Shree Vimalnath Bhagwan Tirth, Sakri
- Antarikṣa Pārśvanātha Tīrtha, Pavali Jain Mandir, Vighnahara Parshvanath Shvetambar Mandir
- Chintamani Parshvanath Mandir in Nashik
- Pashvanath Jain Temple, Nijampur Dhule
- Paithan Jain Tirth
- Karanja Jain temple
- Shri Digamber Jain Siddha Kshetra Kunthalgiri
- Trimurti Digambar Jain Mandir
- Shree Mahavir Jain Temple in Pimpri-Chinchwad
- Shri Vimalnatha Jain Śvetāmbara Temple
- Kachner Jain temple
- Dahigaon

=== Nagaland ===
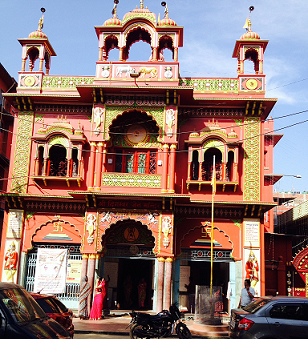
Dimapur Jain Temple, Nagaland

Kohima Jain Temple
- Dimapur Jain Temple, Dimapur
- Kohima Jain temple, Kohima

=== Odisha ===
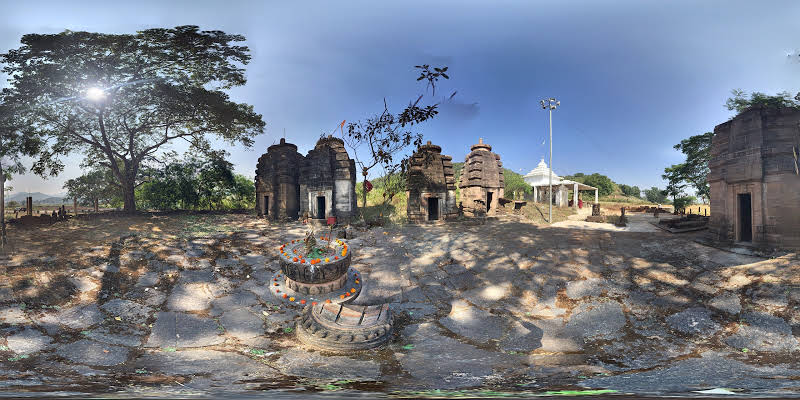
Subai Jain temples built in 4th century

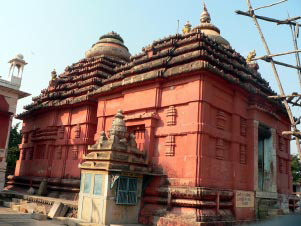
Khandagiri Jain temple

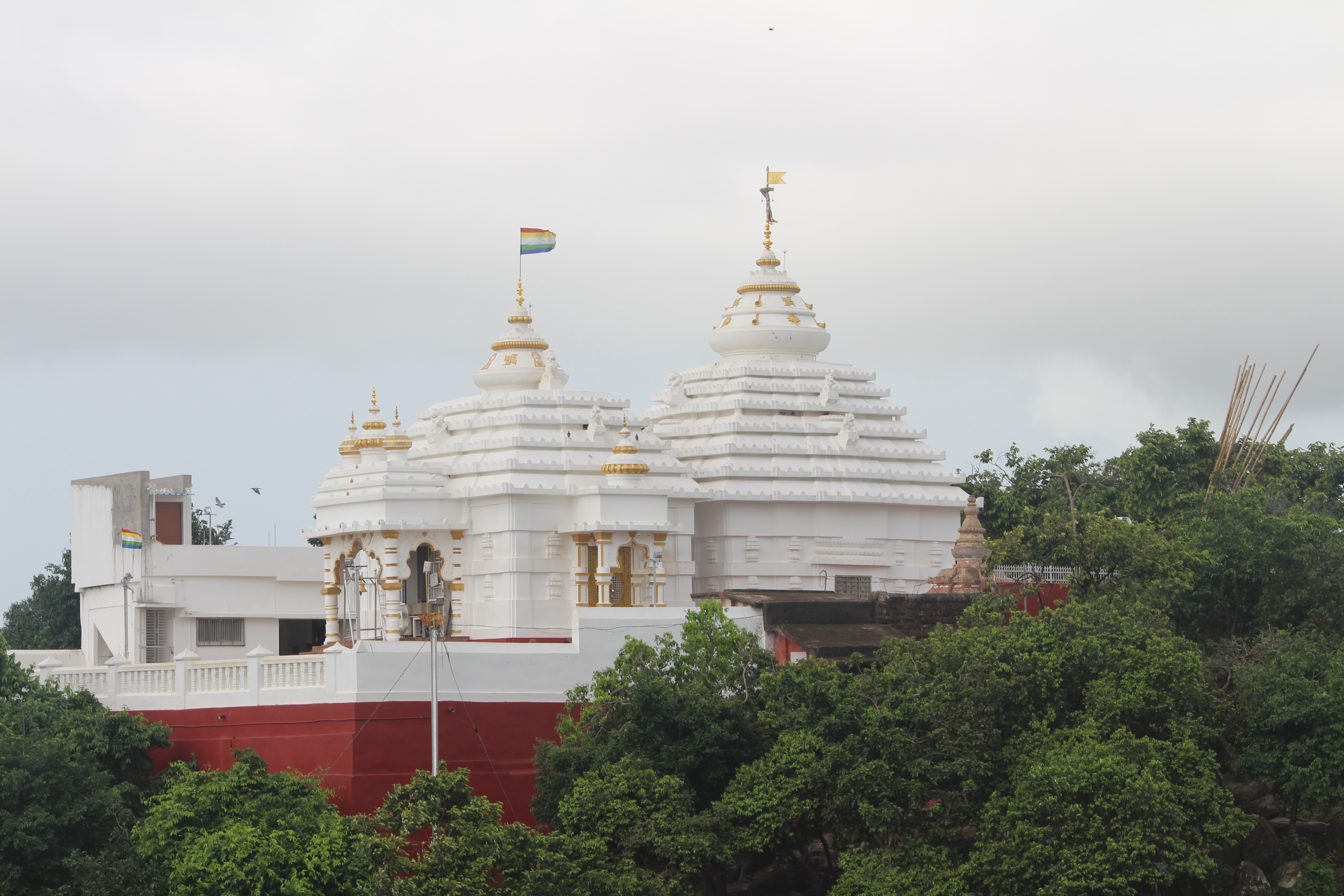
Jain temple near Udayagiri and Khandagiri Caves

Cave temple

- Udayagiri and Khandagiri Caves, Bhubaneswar: 2nd century BCE

Main temple

- Digambara Jaina Temple, Khandagiri
- Parsvanath Jain Temple-I and Parsvanath Jain Temple-II, Khandagiri hill
- Subai Jain temples: 4th century CE
- Jaugada, Ganjam
- Digambara Jain Temple, Rourkela

=== Rajasthan ===
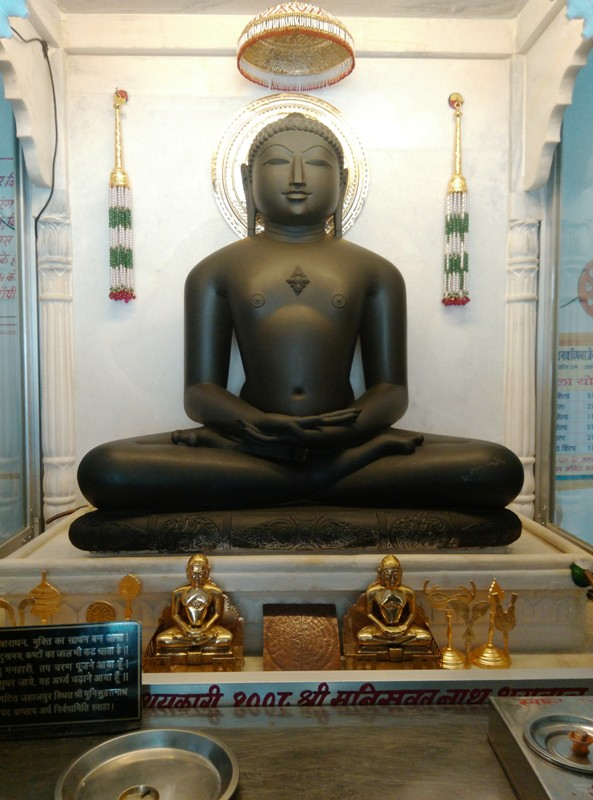
Statue of Munisuvratnath at Jahazpur Jain Mandir

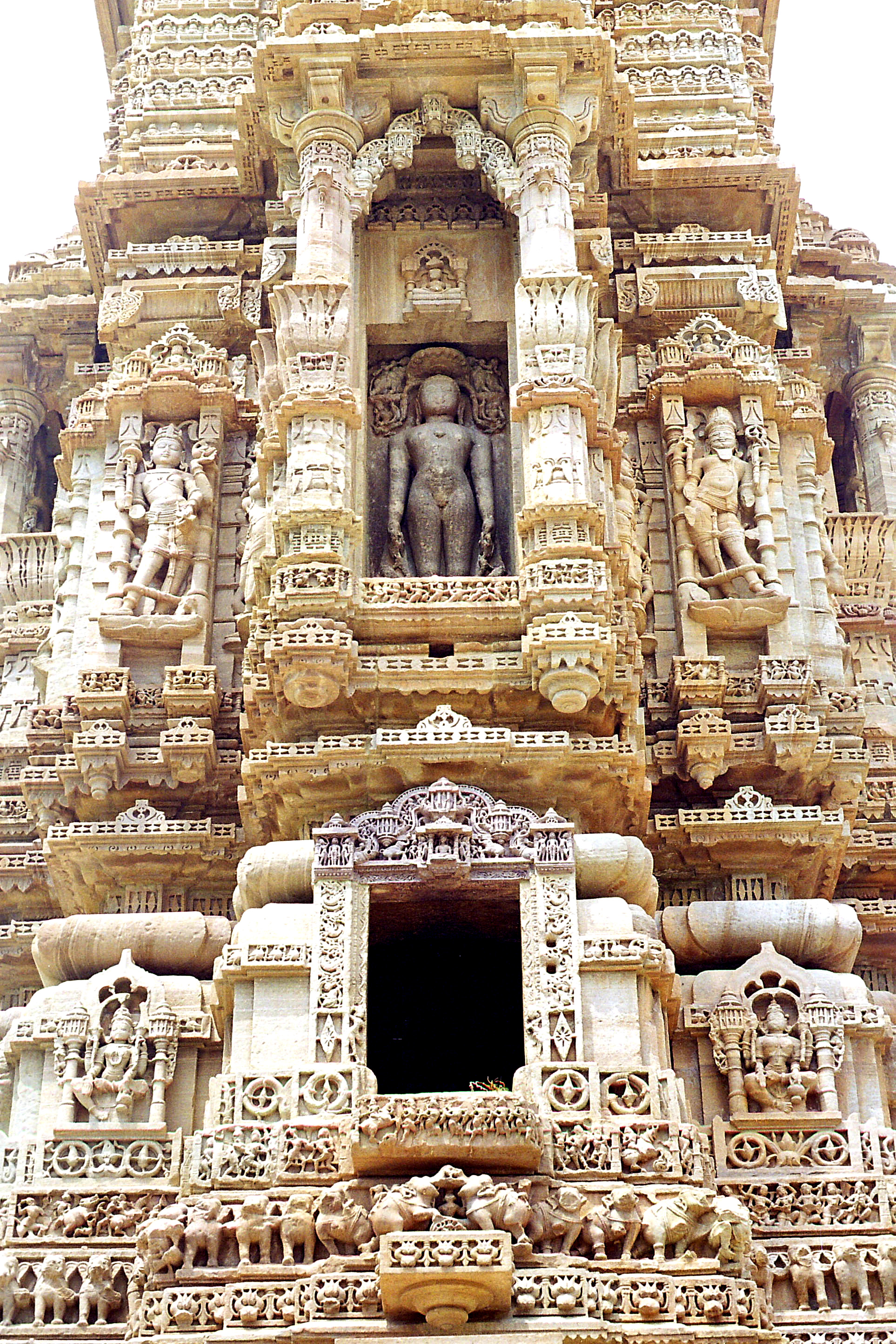
Kirti Stambh, Chittor Fort

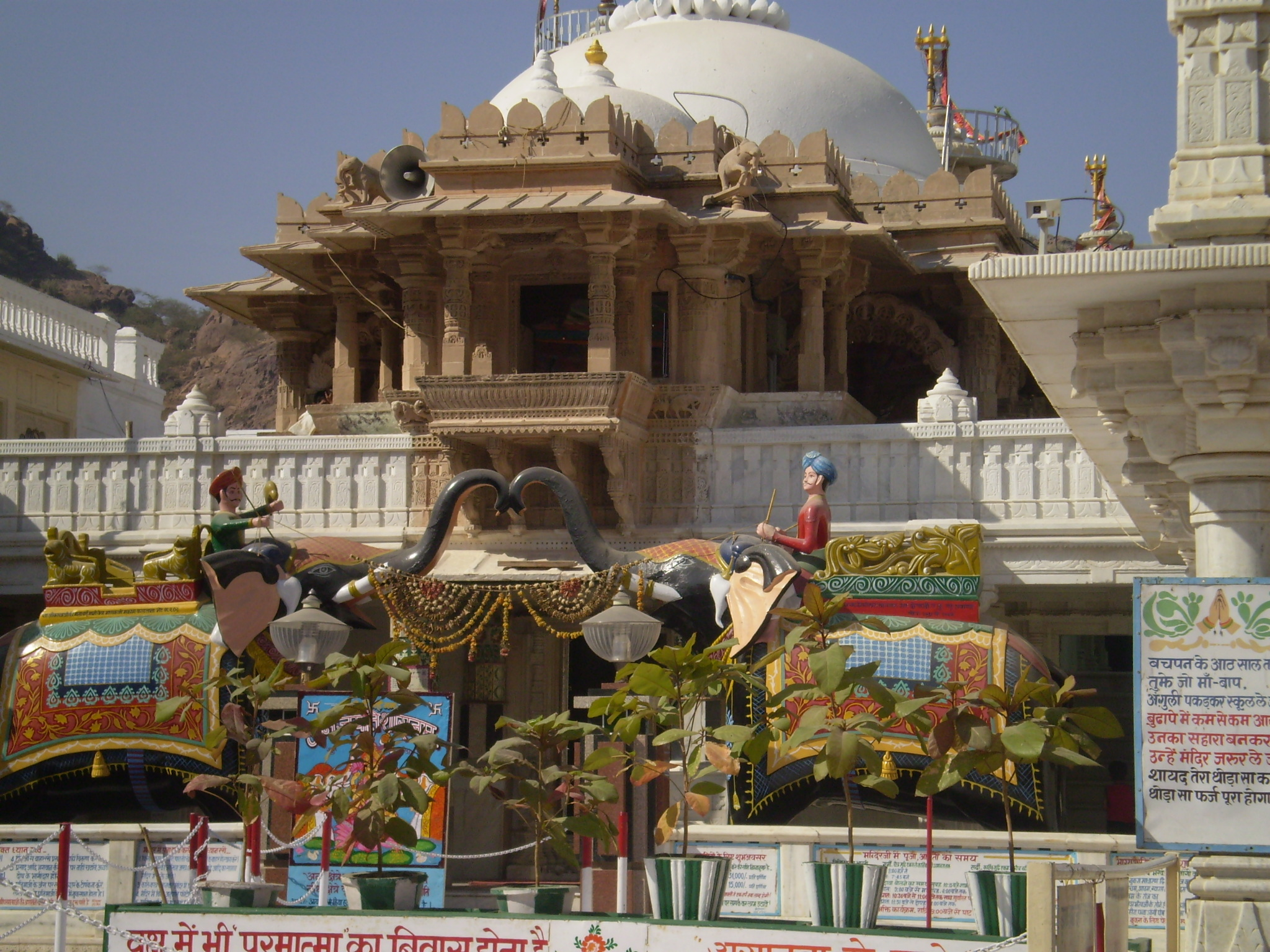
Nakoda Parsvanath temple

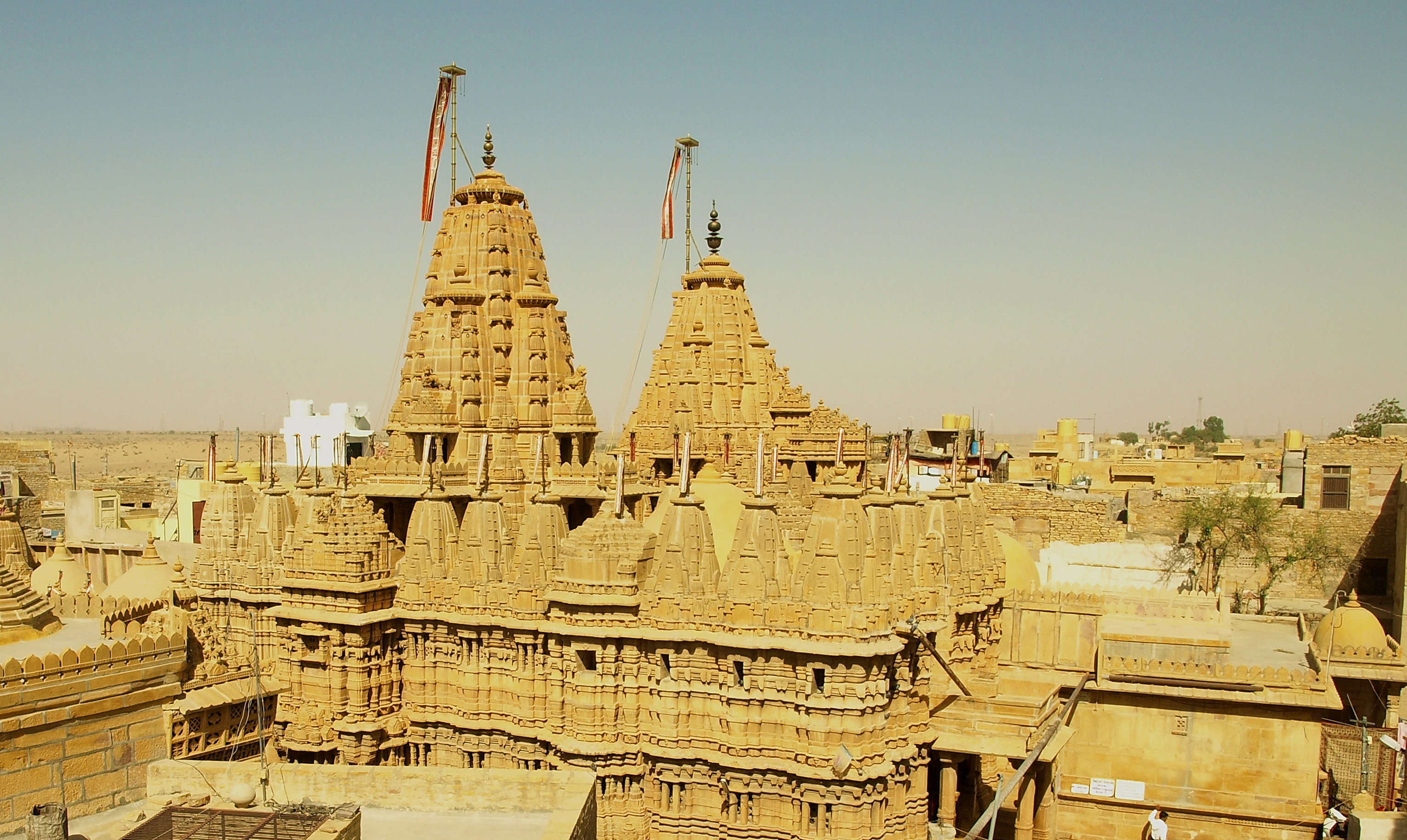
Parshavantha temple, Jaisalmer Fort

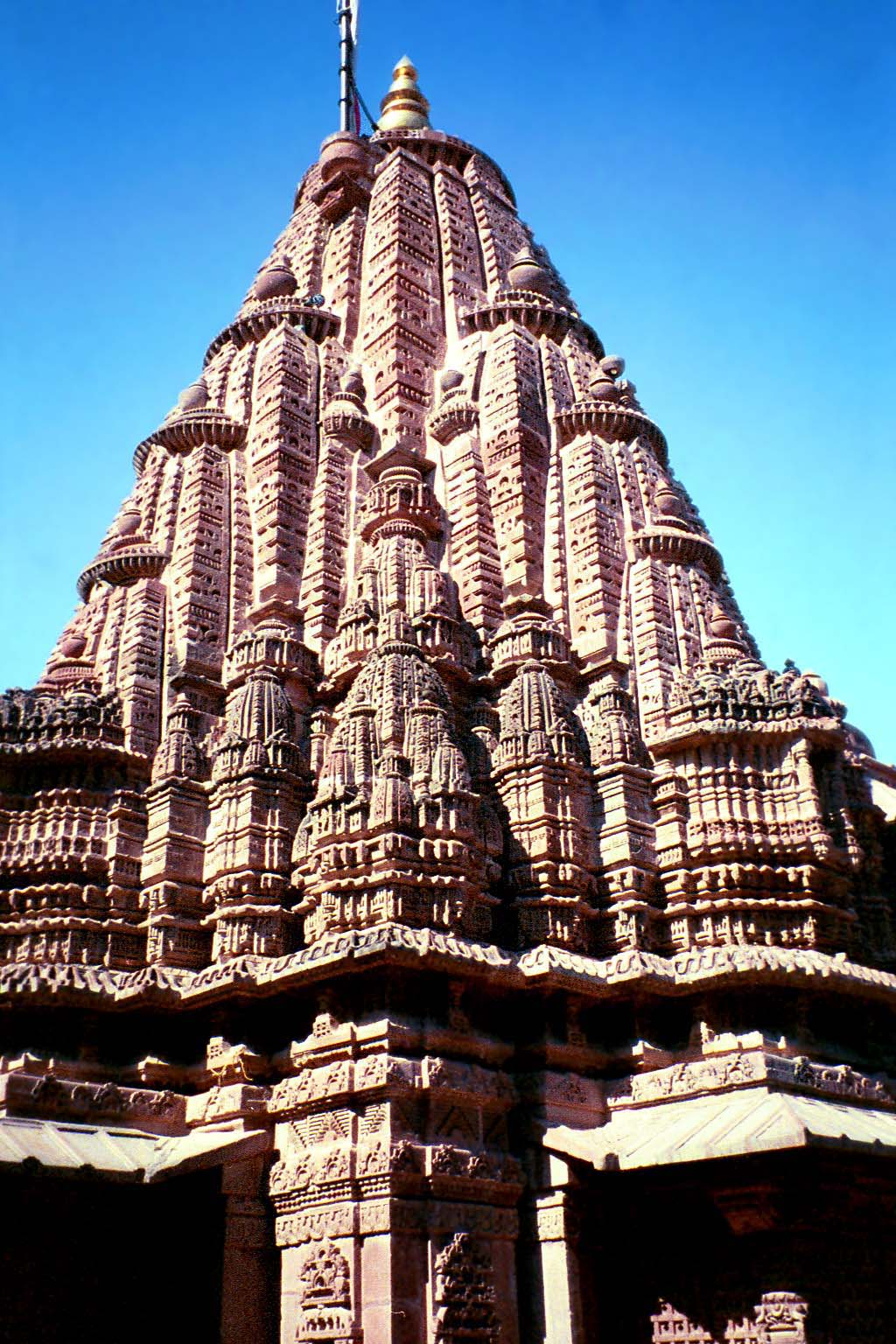
Osian Jain temple

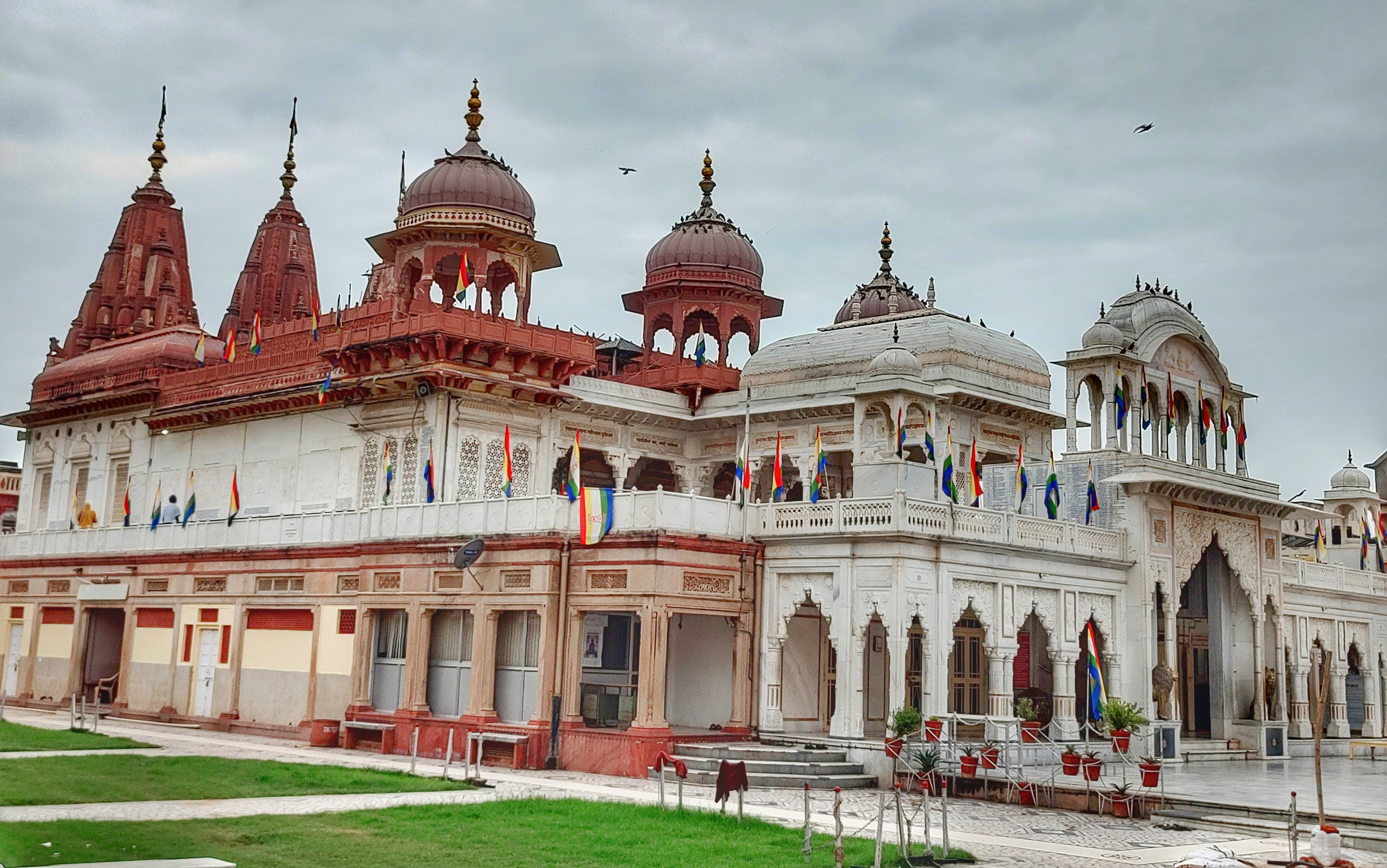
Shri Mahavirji
- Ranakpur Jain Temple, Ranakpur
- Dilwara Temples, Mount Abu
- Mirpur Jain Temple, Sirohi
- Shri Mahaveerji, Karauli
- Sanghiji, Sanganer
- Soniji Ki Nasiyan (Ajmer Jain Temple)
- Nareli Jain Temple
- Kesariyaji Tirth, Rishabhdeo
- Tijara Jain Temple, Alwar
- Mahavira Jain temple, Osian
- Lodhurva Jain temple
- Nakodaji
- Bhandasar Jain Temple in Bikaner
- Kirti Stambh in Chittor Fort
- Jain Temples in Kumbhalgarh Fort
- Bijolia Parshvanath temple
- Andeshwar Parshwanath
- Jaisalmer Fort Jain temples
- Amar Sagar Jain temple
- Muchhal Mahavir Temple
- Chand Khedi, Jhalawar
- Naugaza Digambar Jain temple
- Padampura, Jaipur
- Shree Pavapuri Tirth Dham, Sirohi district
- Jirawala
- Chamatkarji
- Ladnu Jain temple
- Atishaya Kshetra Lunwa Jain Temple at Nagaur district
- Nageshwar Parshwanath Tirth
- Jahaj Mandir, Mandwala
- Bhandavapur
- Mungathala
- Atishykari Shri 1008 Munisuvratnath Jain Mandir, Jahazpur
- Nanaji Jain temple
- Kanor Adeshware Ji
- Bhinmal Bhaya-Bhanjan Parshvanath Temple
- Swaran Jain temple, Falna
- Rata Mahaveerji
- Shri Navlakha Parshwanath Jain Temple, Pali, Rajasthan
- Jain temples in Tonk dist.
- Jain temples in Jalore
- Jain Temple in Bishangarh
- Shantinath Jain Temple, Jhalawar
- Keshoraipatan Jain temple
- Sanderao Jain Temple
- Khimel Jain Temple
- Shri Narlia Teerth
- Pindwara
- Ranoli
- Choolgiri, Jaipur
- Adinath Temple, Dungarpur
- Delwara Jain temples, Udaipur

=== Telangana ===
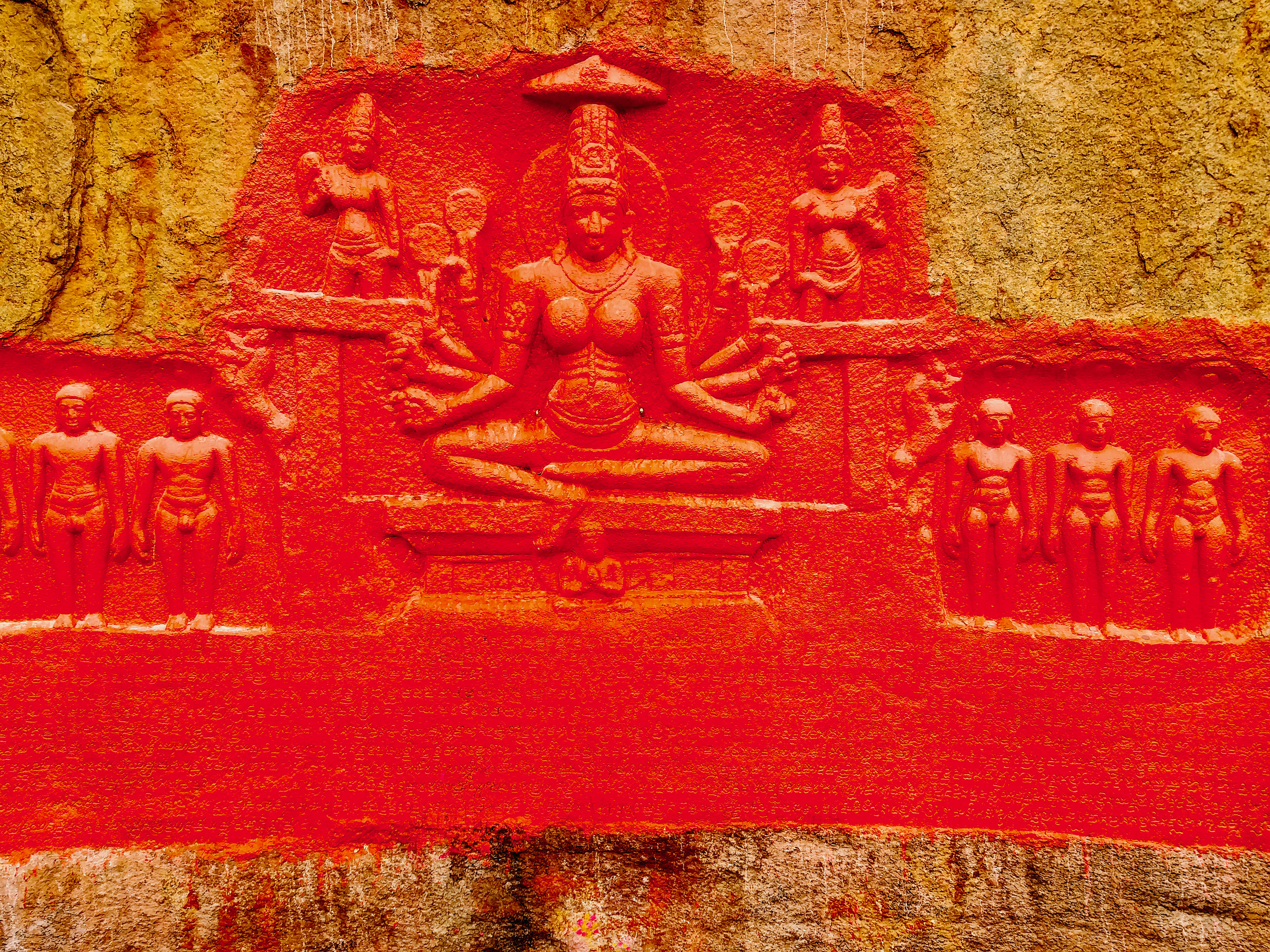
Bommalagutta

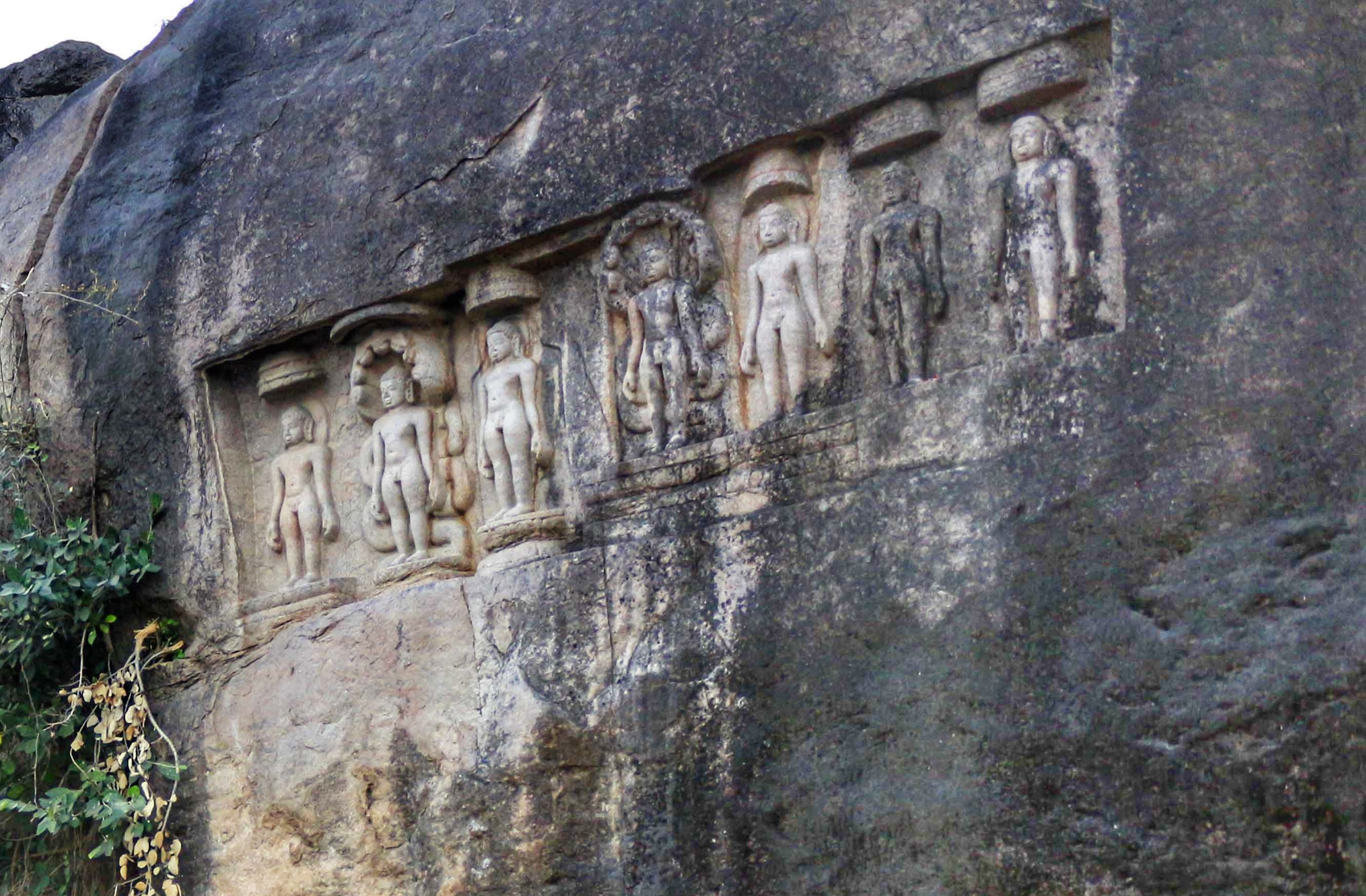
Aggalayya Gutta

Cave temple

- Bommalagutta cave temple and Tribhuvanatilaka Basadi
- Aggalayya Gutta

Main temple

- Kulpakji
- Shri Vighn-harneshvar Parshva Digambara Jain Atishaya Kshetra in Kulcharam
- Gollathagudi

=== Tamil Nadu ===
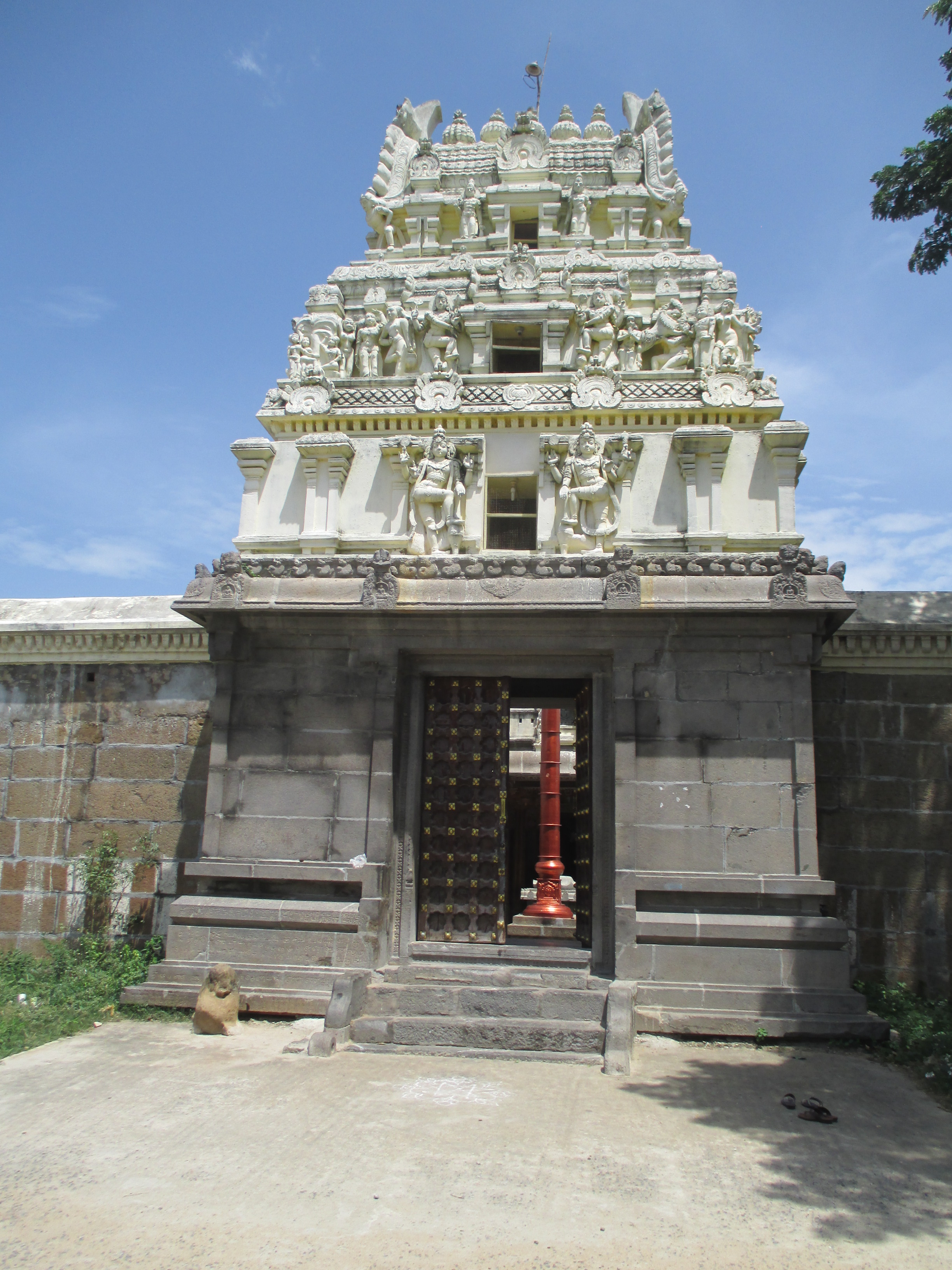
Trilokyanatha Temple, Kanchipuram

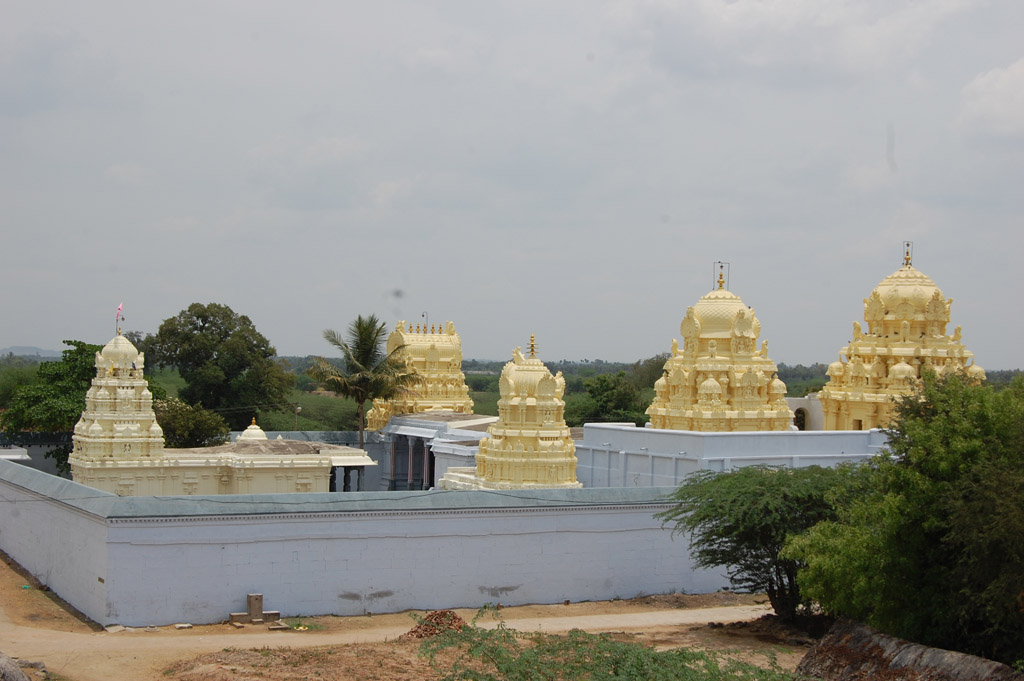
Karanthai Jain Temple

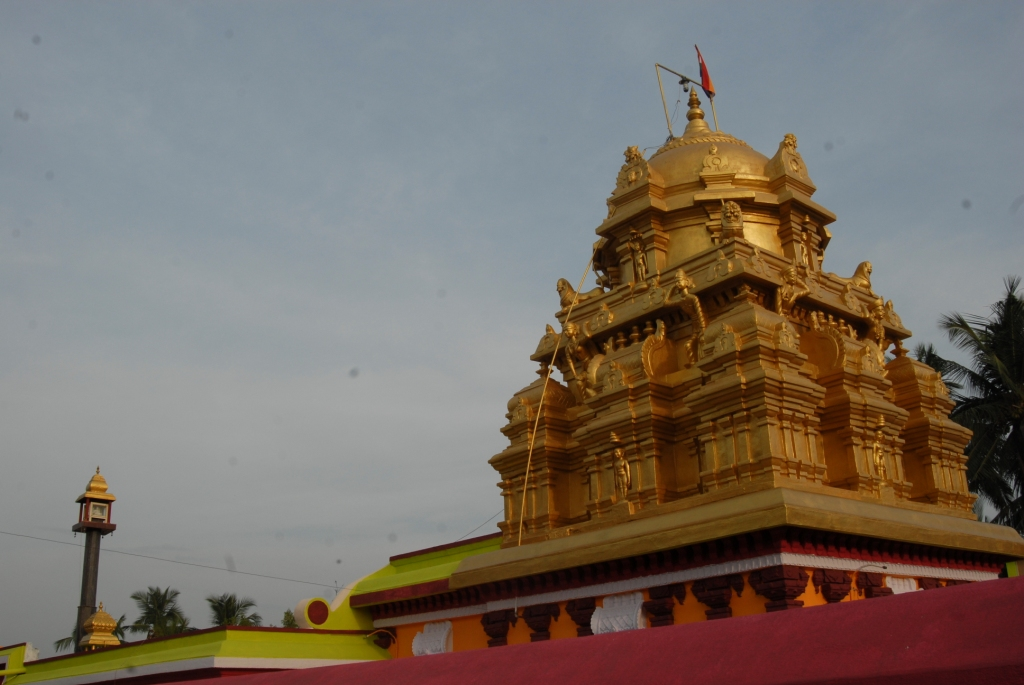
Shri Adinatheeswarar Jain Temple, Desur

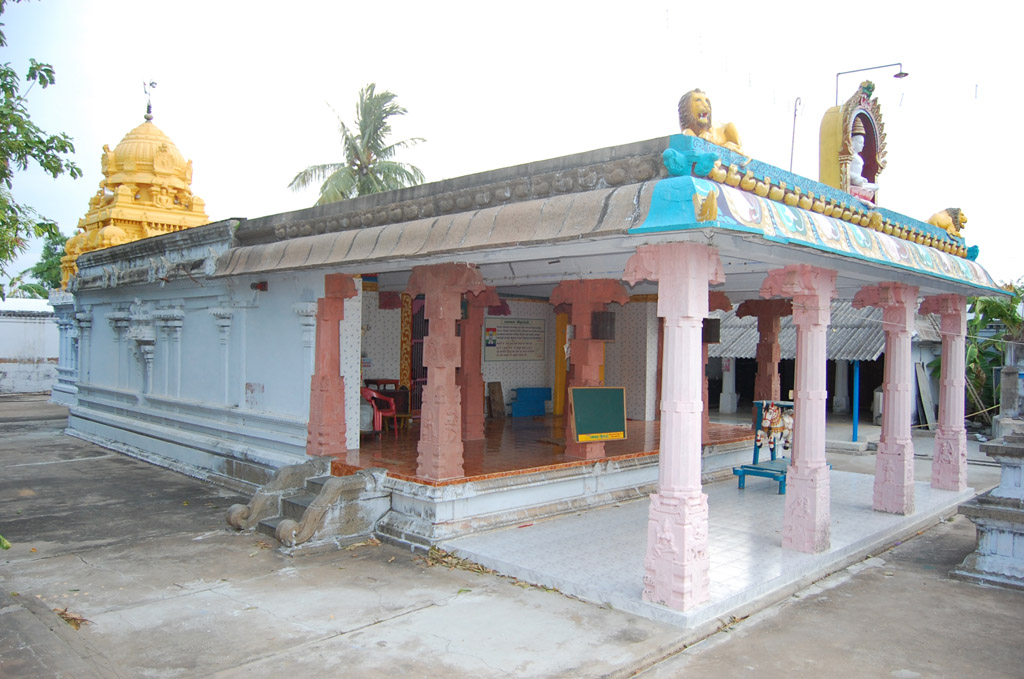
Thirupanamur Digambar Jain Temple

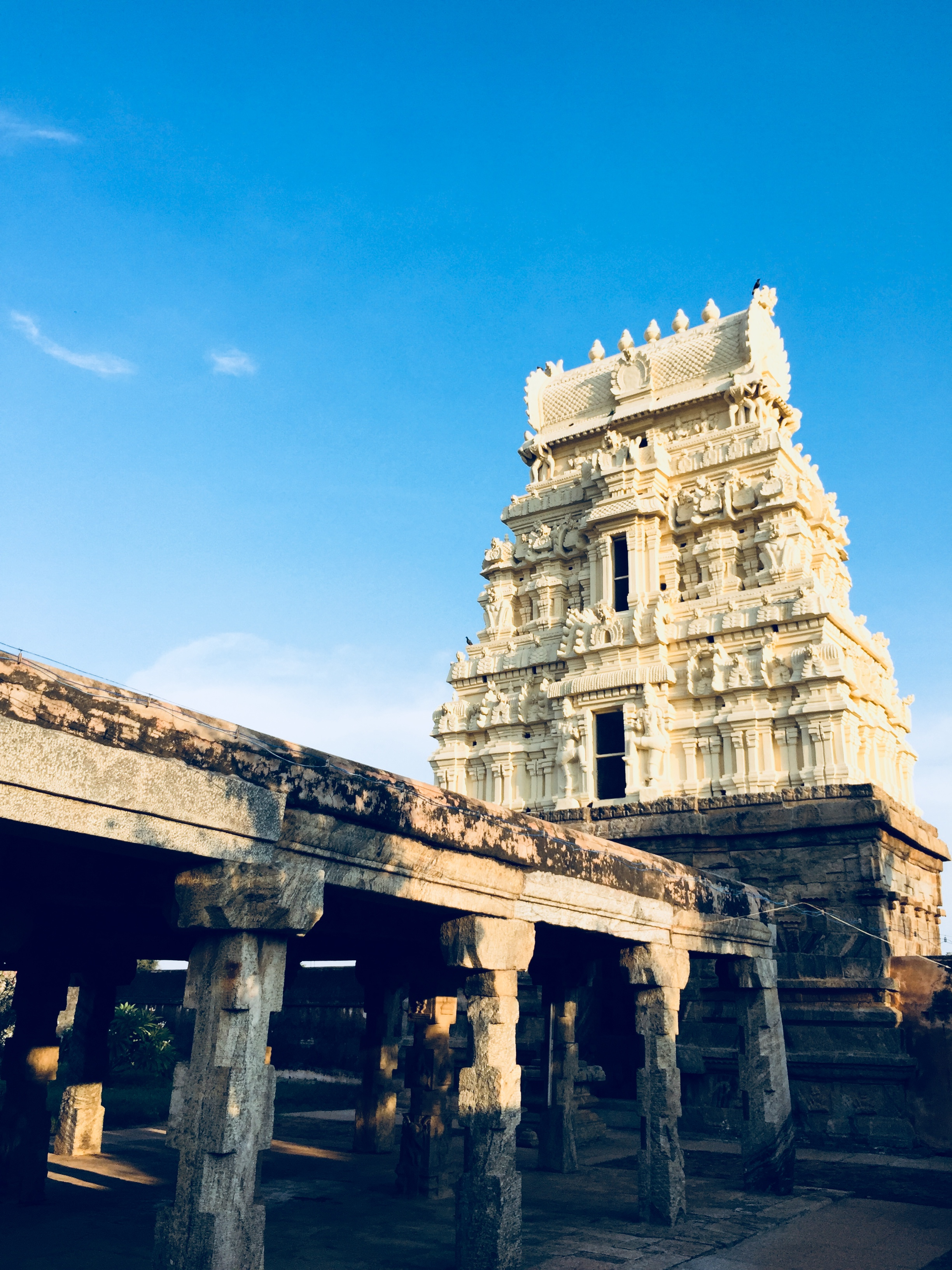
Vijayamangalam Jain temple

Cave temples

- Tirumalai (Jain complex)
- Kalugumalai Jain Beds
- Thirakoil
- Samanar Hills
- Sittanavasal Cave: 2nd century BCE
- Thirakoil, Thiruvannamalai
- Vallimalai Jain caves
- Thirupparankundram Rock-cut Cave and Inscription
- Kurathimalai, Onampakkam
- Panchapandavar Malai
- Seeyamangalam temple
- Kanchiyur Jain cave and stone beds
- Ennayira Malai
- Andimalai Stone beds, Cholapandiyapuram
- Adukkankal, Nehanurpatti
- Kalugumalai Jain Beds
- Kanchiyur Jain cave and stone beds

Main temples

- Arahanthgiri Jain Math, Thiruvannamalai
- Alagramam Jain Temple
- Chitharal malaikovil: 1st century BCE
- Gingee, Viluppuram
- Karanthai Jain Temple
- Mannargudi Mallinatha Swamy Jain Temple, Thiruvarur
- Mel Sithamur Jain Math, Villupuram
- Poondi Arugar Temple
- Ponnur Hills, Thiruvannamalai
- Sittanavasal, Pudukottai
- Trilokyanatha Temple, Kanchipuram
- Vijayamangalam Jain temple
- Thirupanamur Jain Temple
- Adisvaraswamy Jain Temple, Thanjavur
- Chandraprabha Jain Temple, Kumbakonam
- Deepanayakaswamy Jain Temple, Deepankudi
- Parshvantha temple, Sowcarpet

=== Uttar Pradesh ===
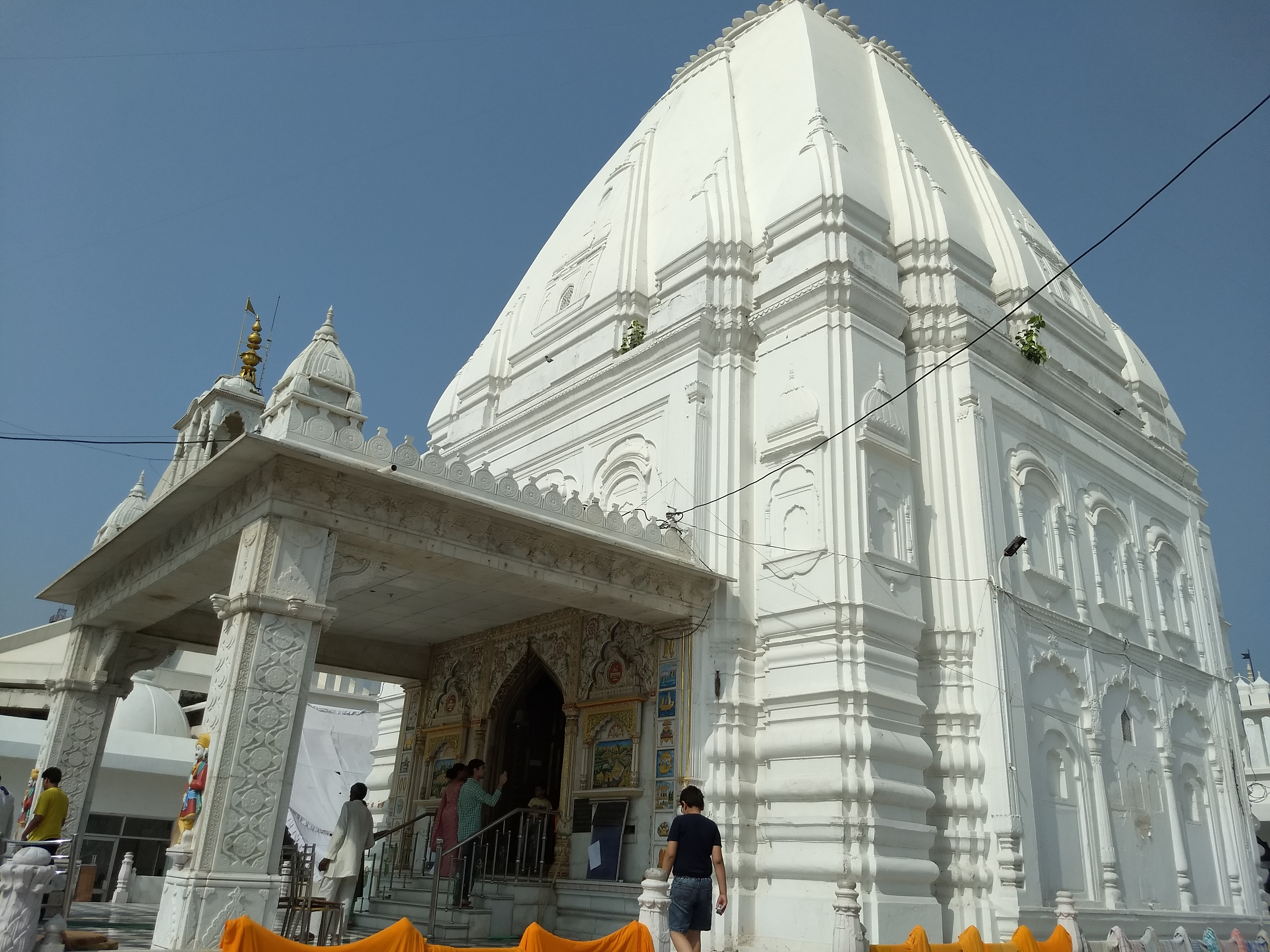
Digamber Jain Bada Mandir Hastinapur

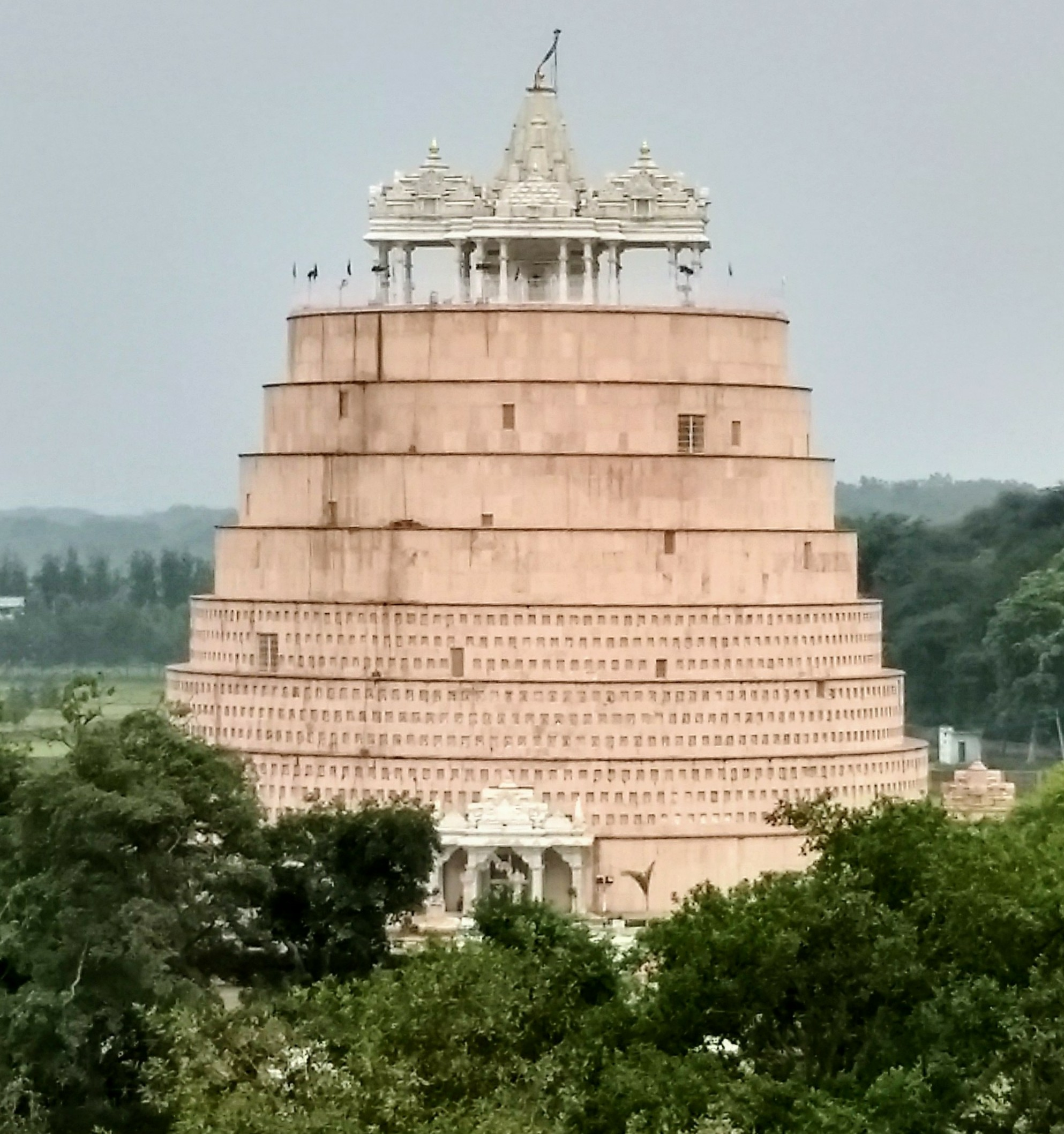
Ashtapad

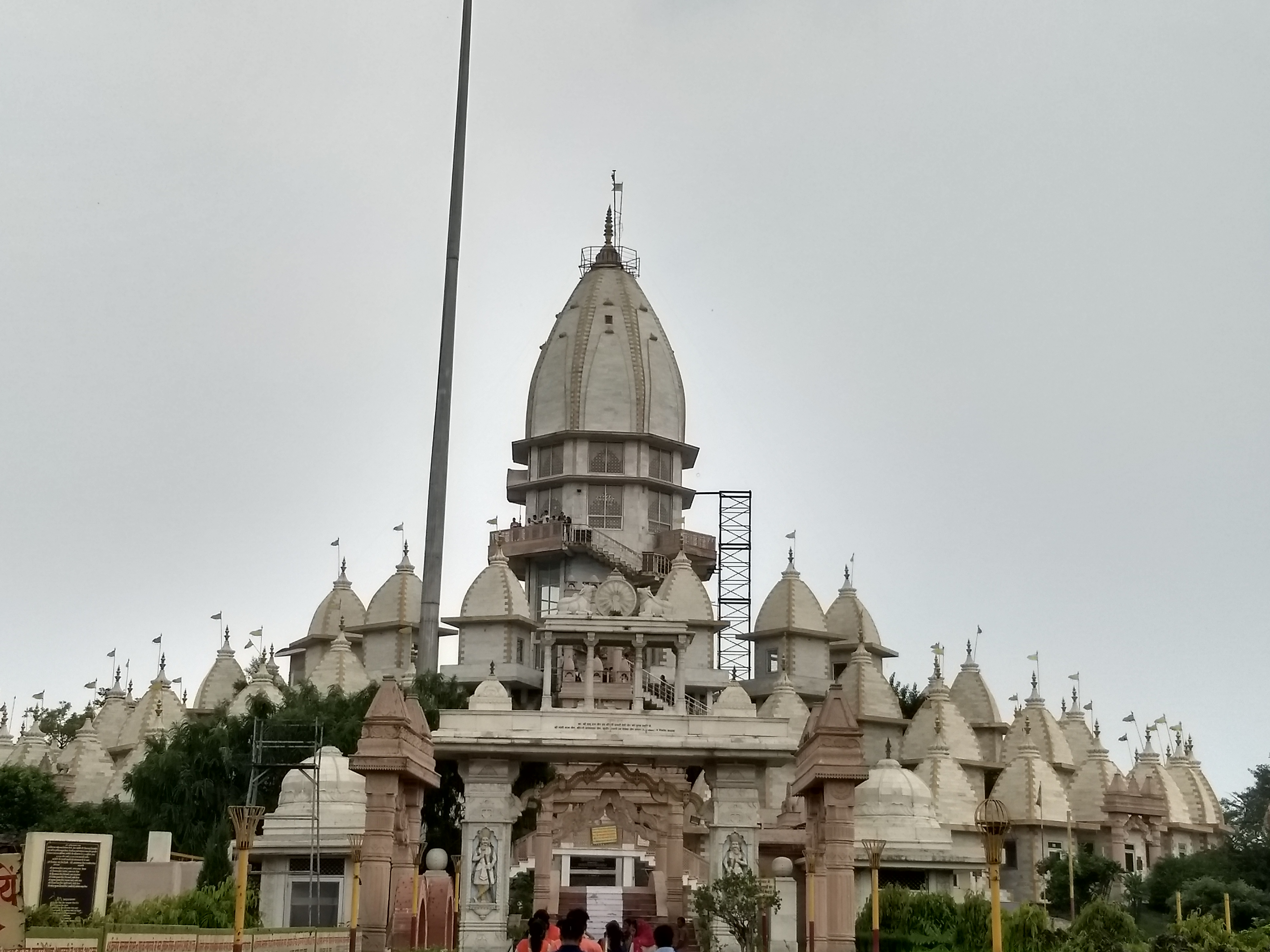
Kailash Parvat Rachna

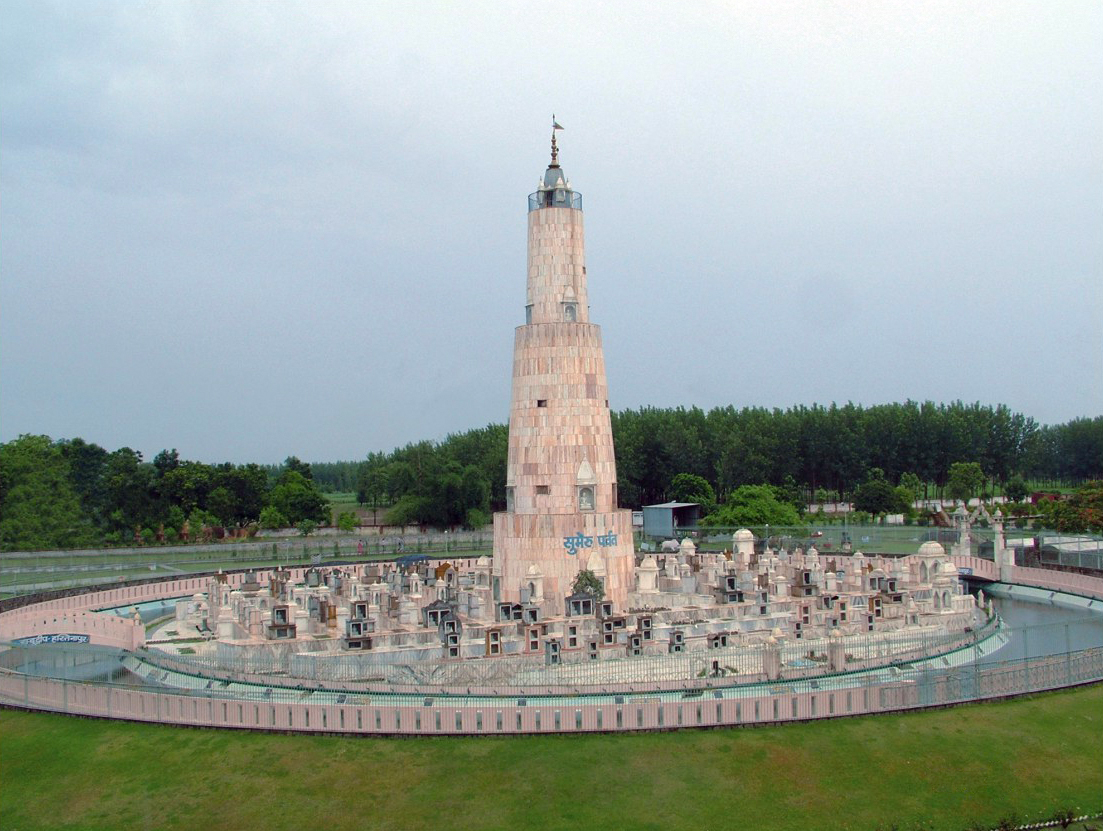
Jambudweep

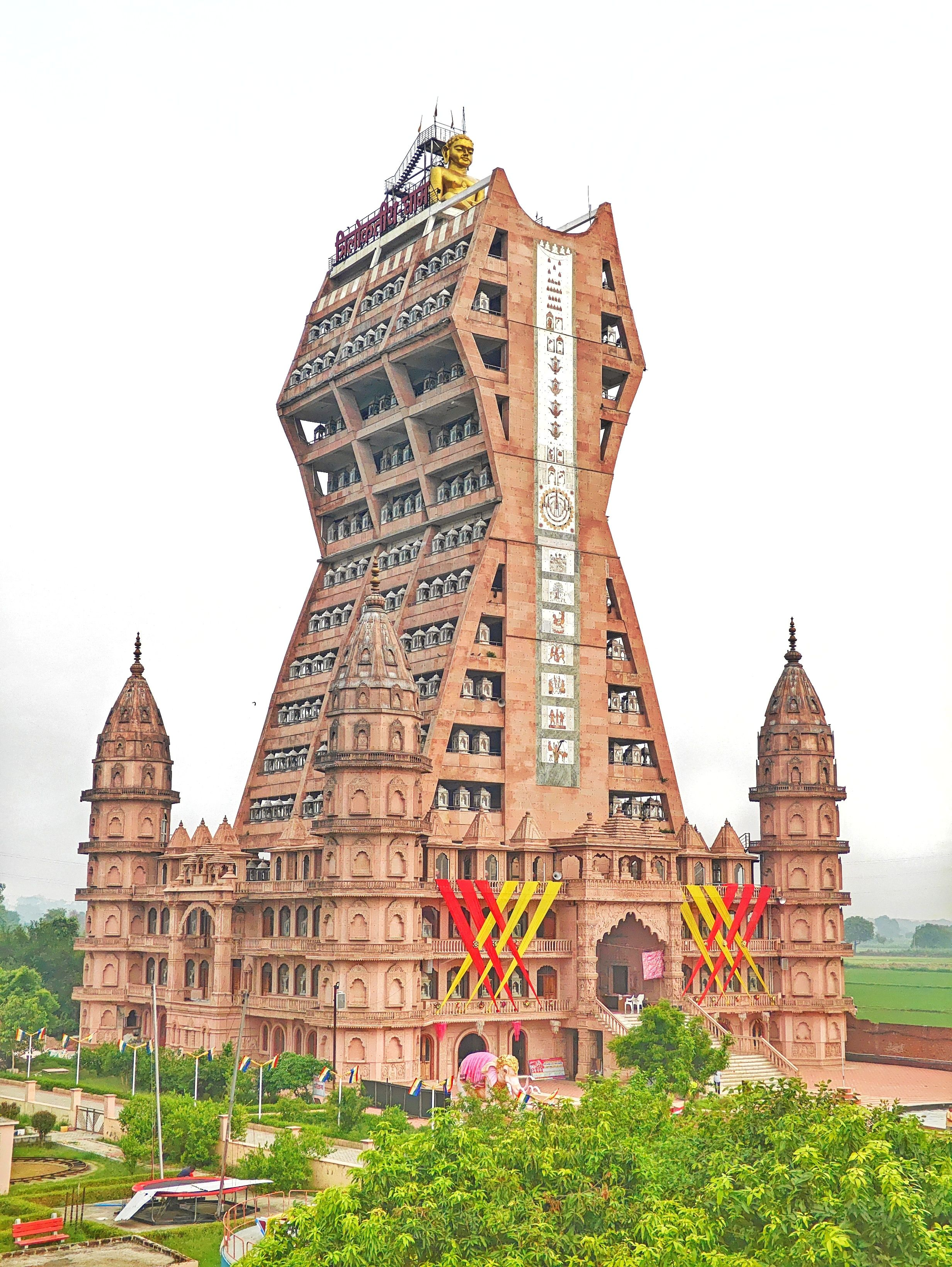
Trilok Teerth Dham

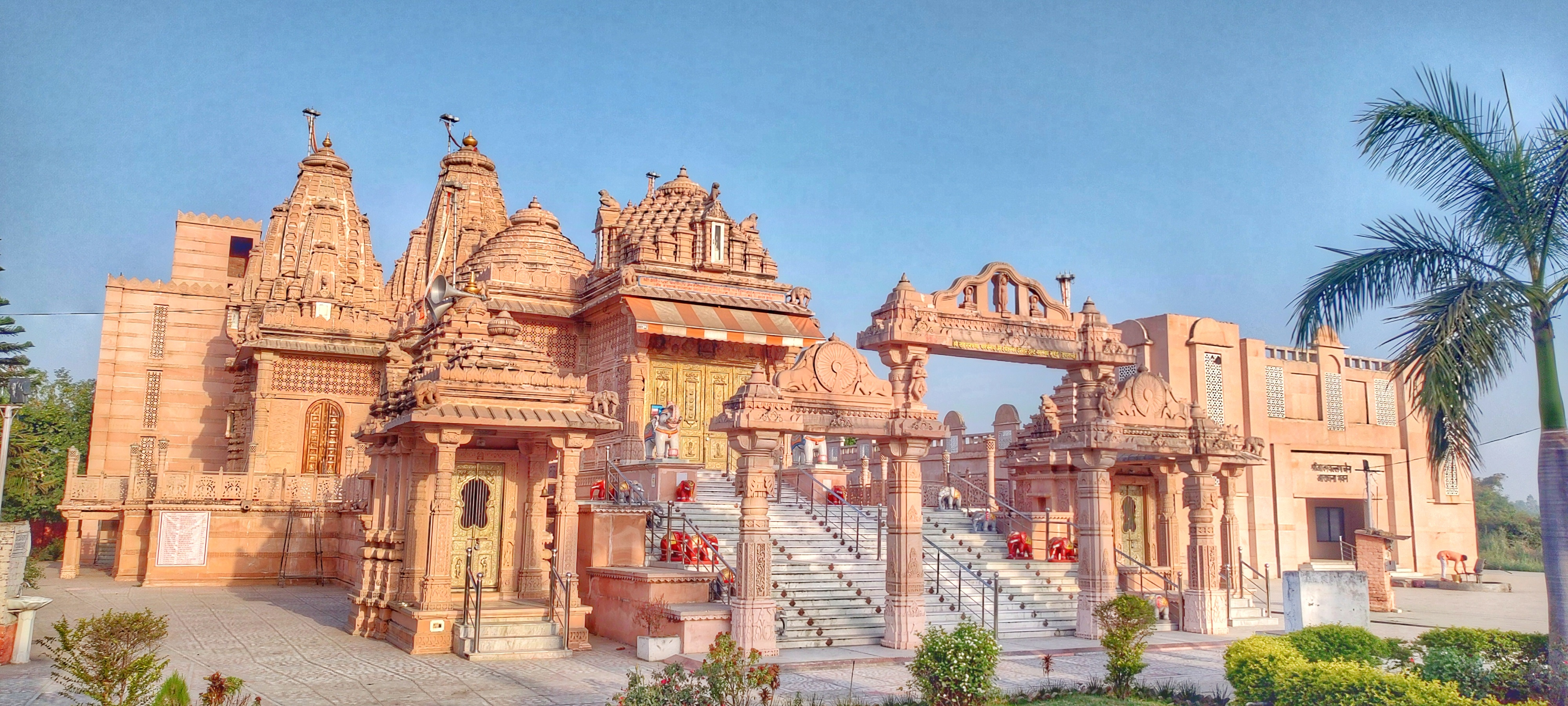
Ahichchhatra Jain temple

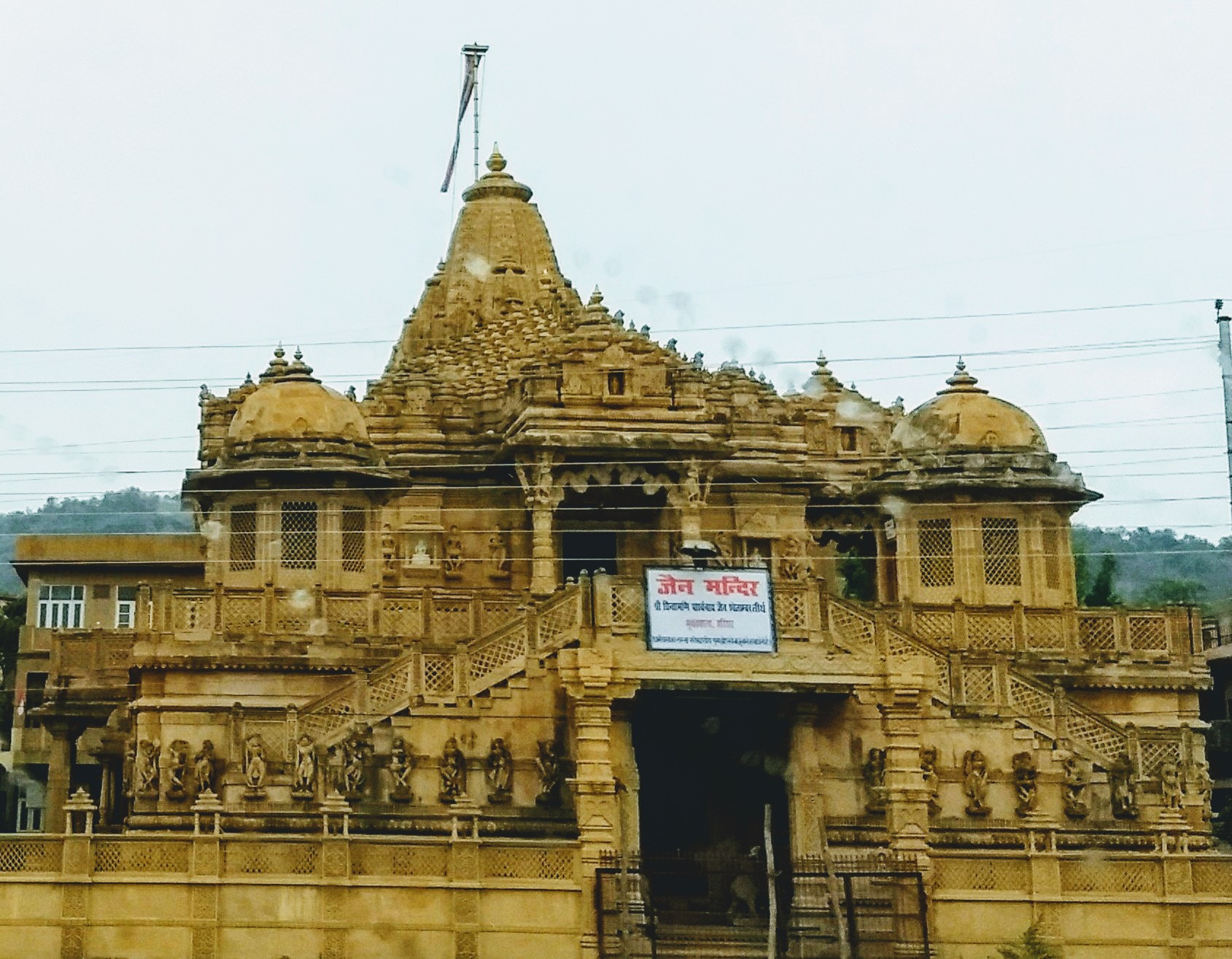
Shri Chintamani Parshwnath temple, Haridwar

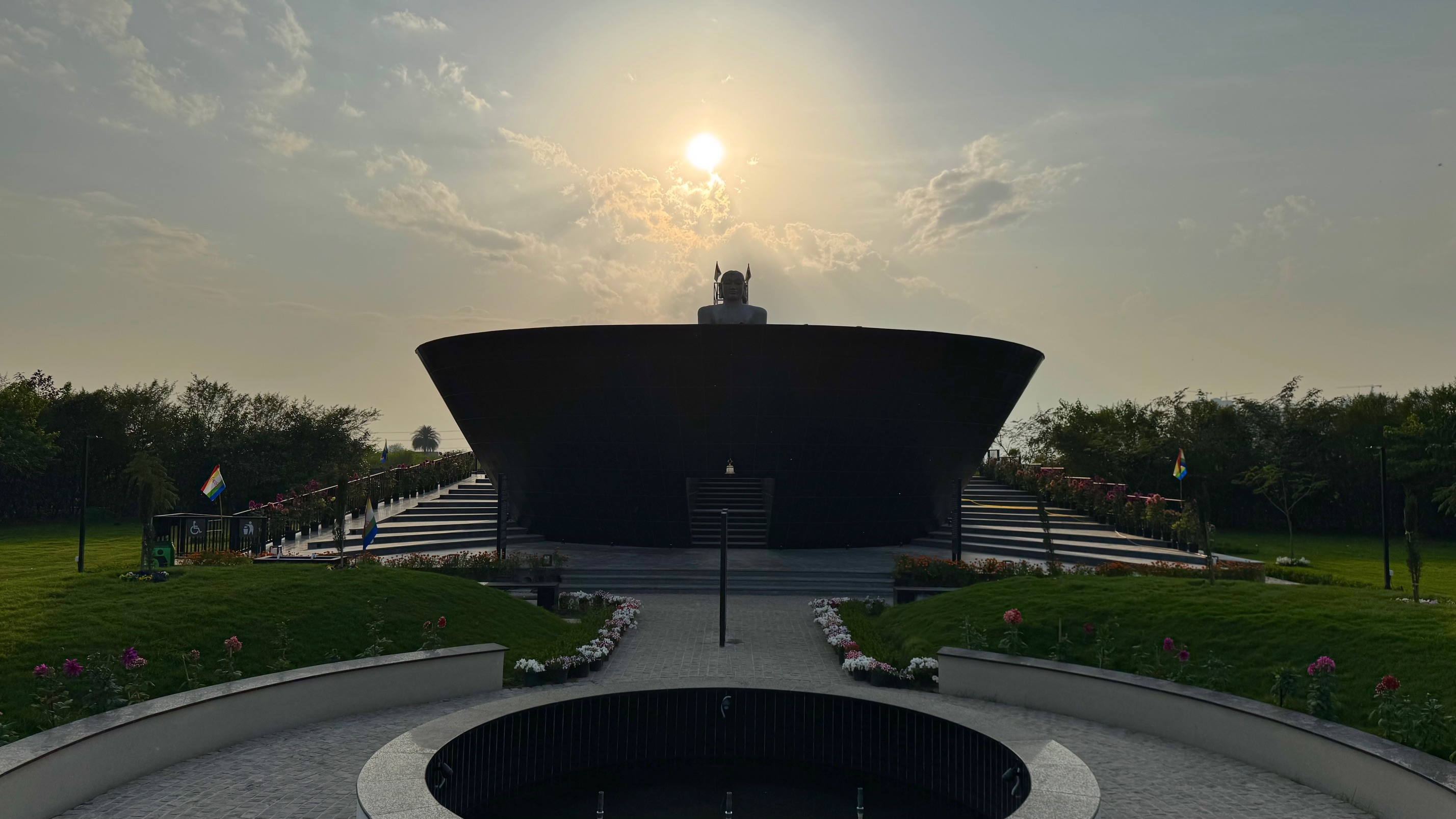
Bahubaleshwar Temple
- Shantinath Temple, Deogarh
- Prachin Bada Mandir, Jambudweep, Kailash Parvat Rachna, Ashtapad Teerth in Hastinapur, Meerut
- Navagarh Tirth
- Ahi Kshetra
- Vahelna Jain temple, Vahelna
- Trilok Teerth Dham, Bada Gaon in Baghpat
- Parshvanath Jain temple and Bhadaini Tirth in Varanasi
- Sarnath Jain Tirth at Sarnath, Varanasi
- Chandrawati Jain temple near Varanasi
- Shobhnath temple, Shravasti
- Shri Shouripur Digambar Jain Siddha Kshetra, Bateshwar
- Shri Vimalnath Digambar Jain Atishay Kshetra in Kampil, Farrukhabad district
- Shree Parsvnath Atishey Kshetra Digamber Jain mandir, Bada Gaon in Baghpat
- Shri Chintamani Parshwnath Jain Śvetāmbara Mandir, Haridwar
- Shri 1008 digamabar Adinath Jain mandir, Raiganj
- Khukhundoo
- Teerthdham Mangalayatan Mandir
- Bahubaleshwar Temple at Greater Noida

=== Uttarakhand ===
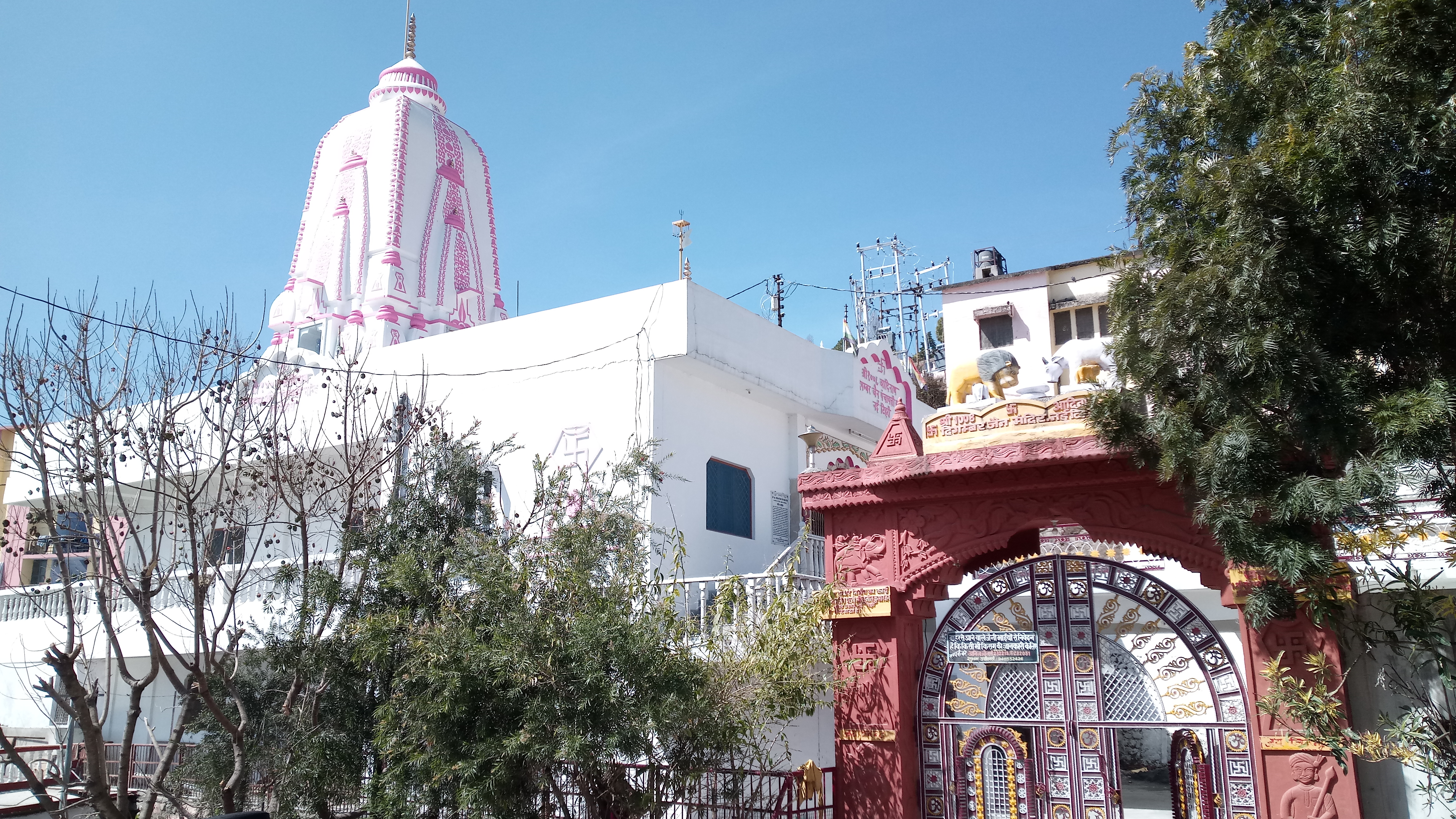
Shri Aadinath Digamber Jain Mandir, New Tehri
- Shri Adinath Digambar Jain Mandir, New Tehri
- 1008 Shri Rishabhdev Jain Mandir, Shrinagar

=== West Bengal ===
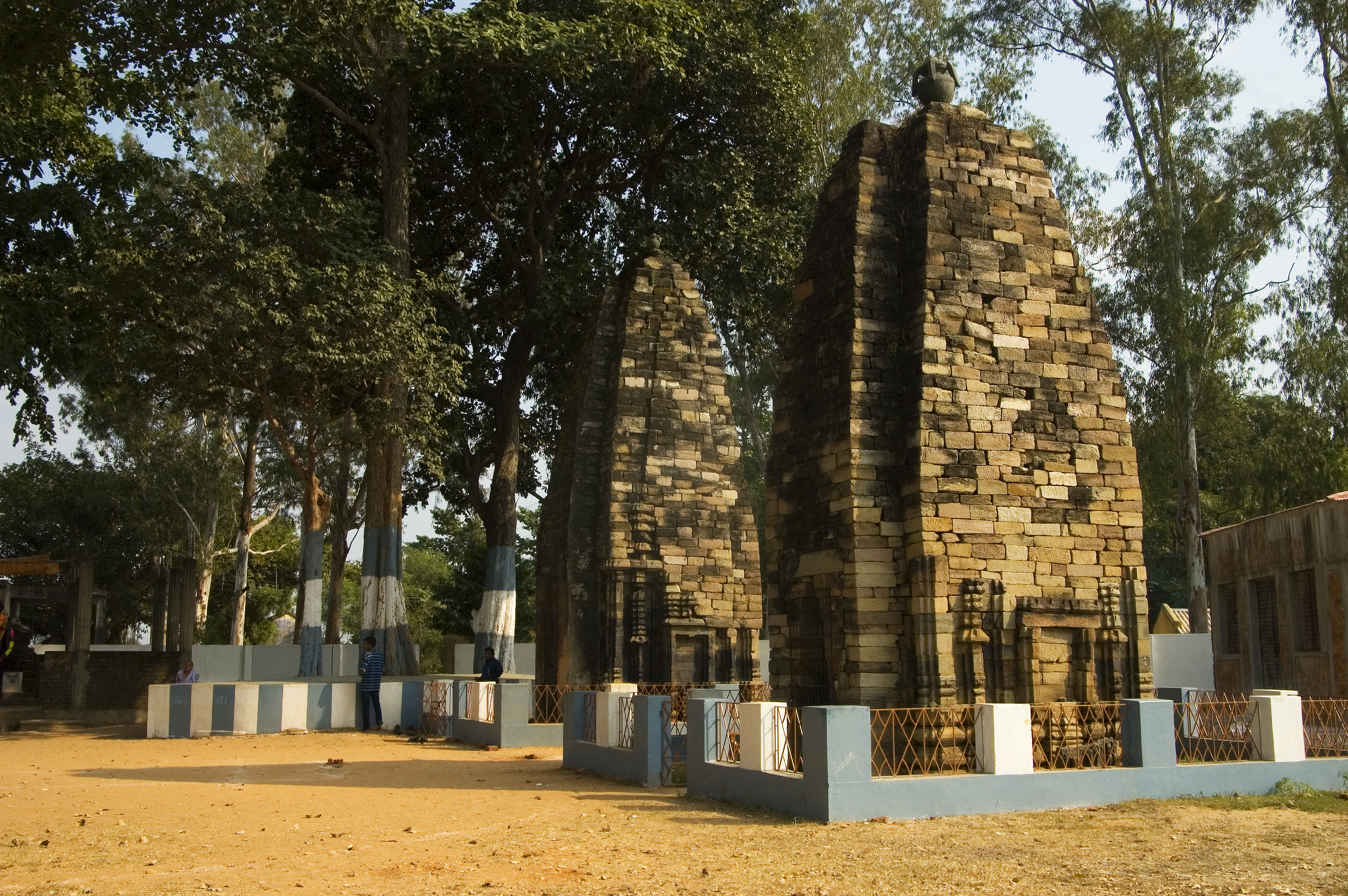
Pakbirra Jain temples, Purulia

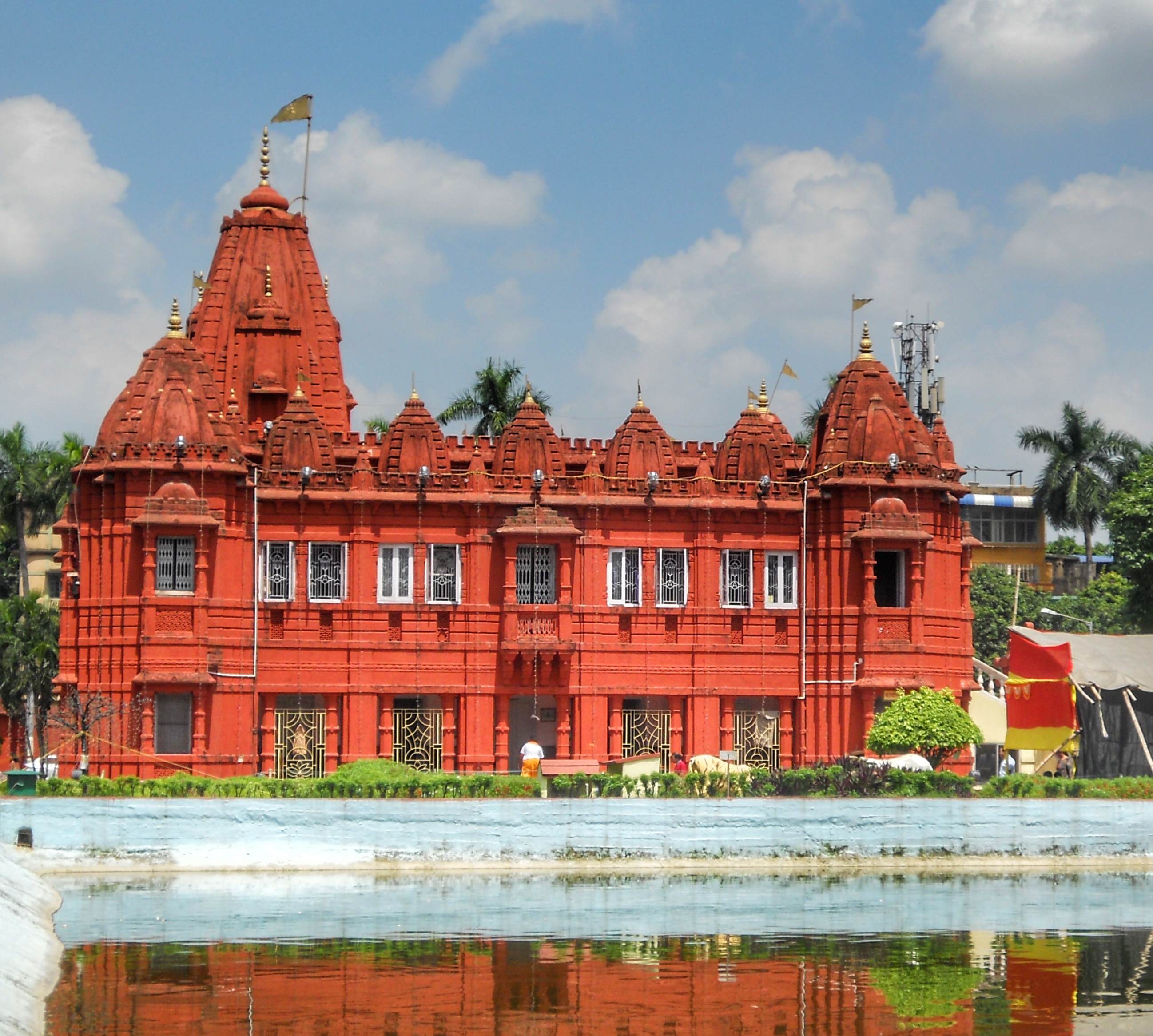
Belgachia Pareshnath Mandir

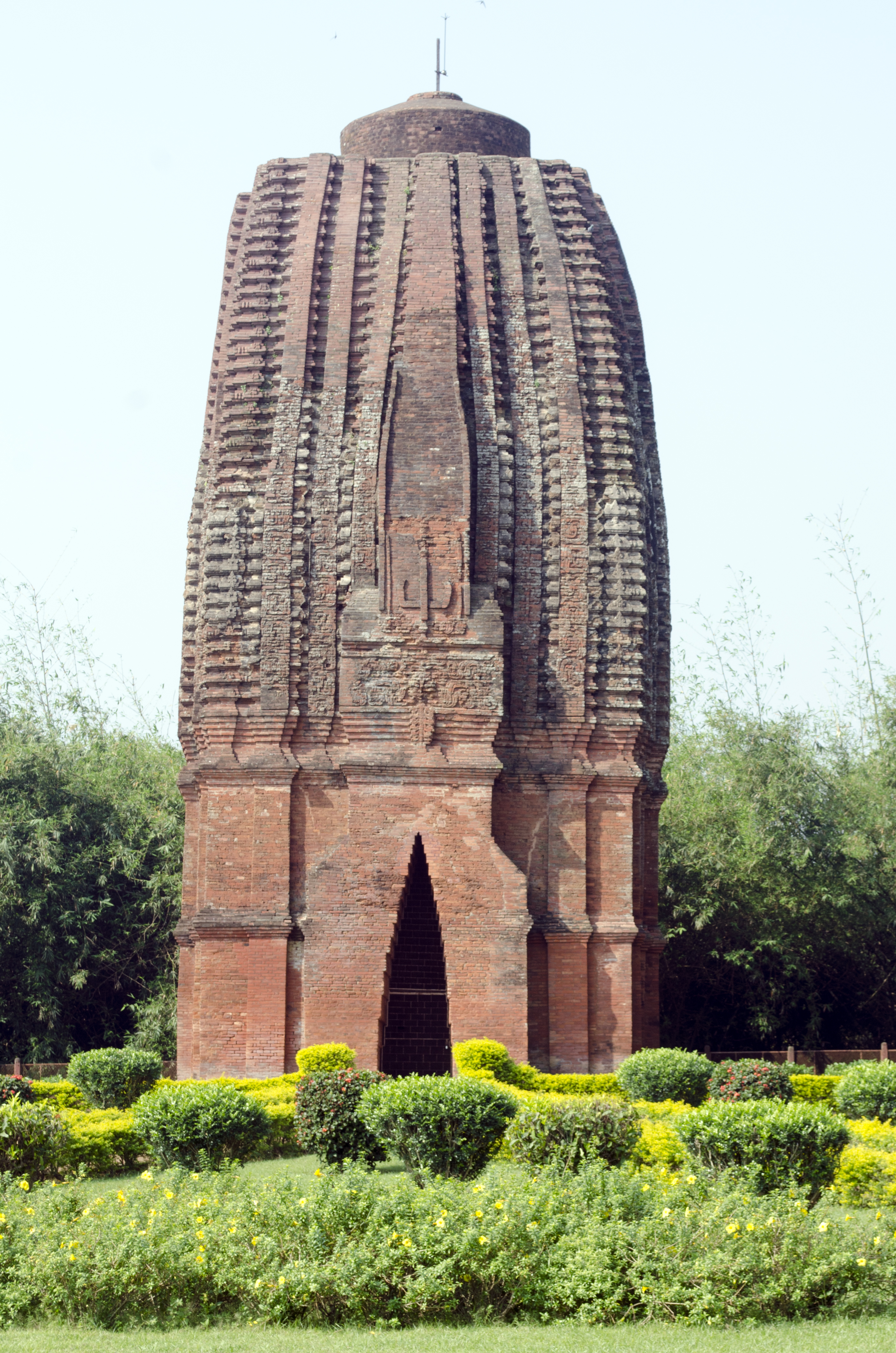
Sat Deul

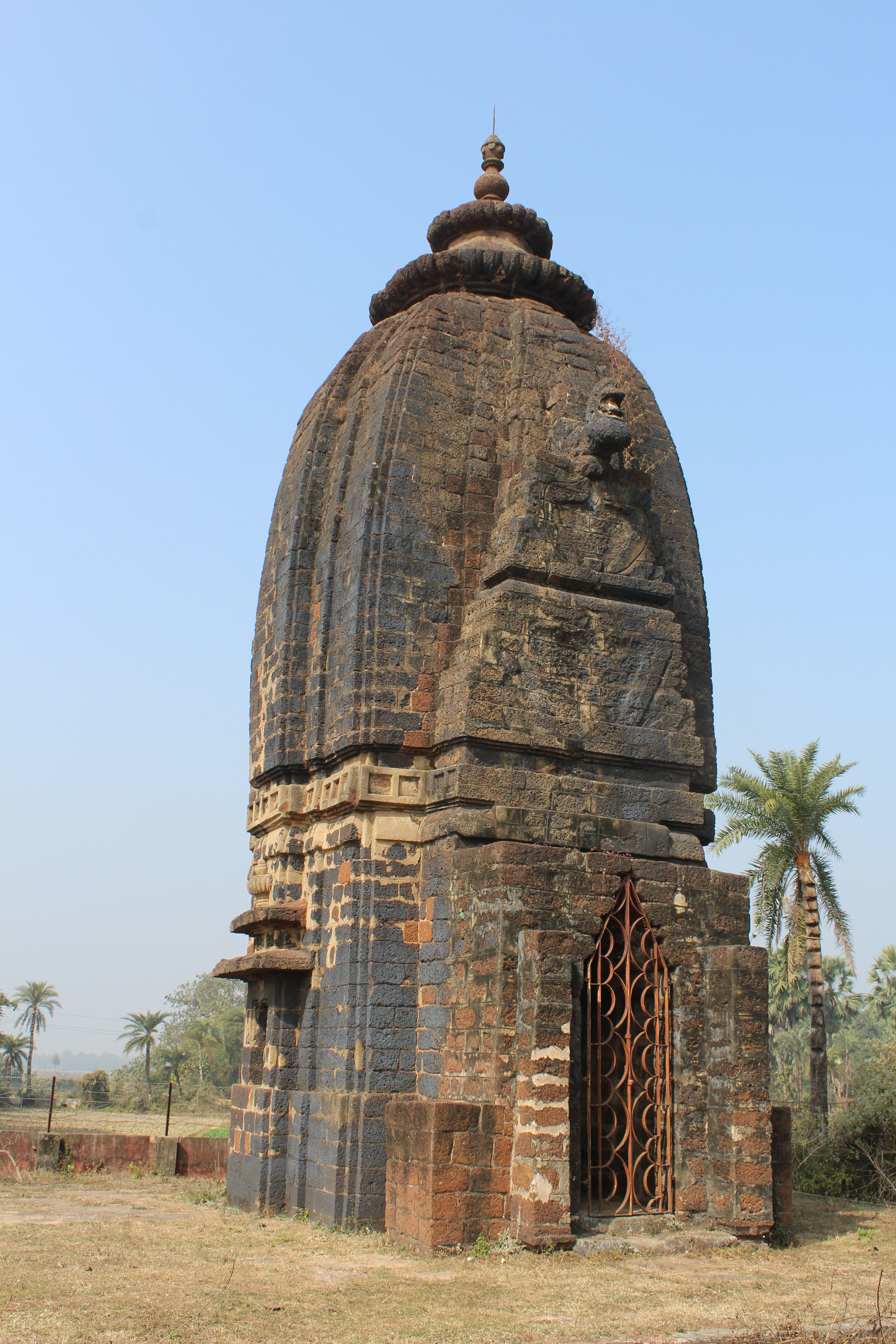
Parshvanatha temple, Deulbhira

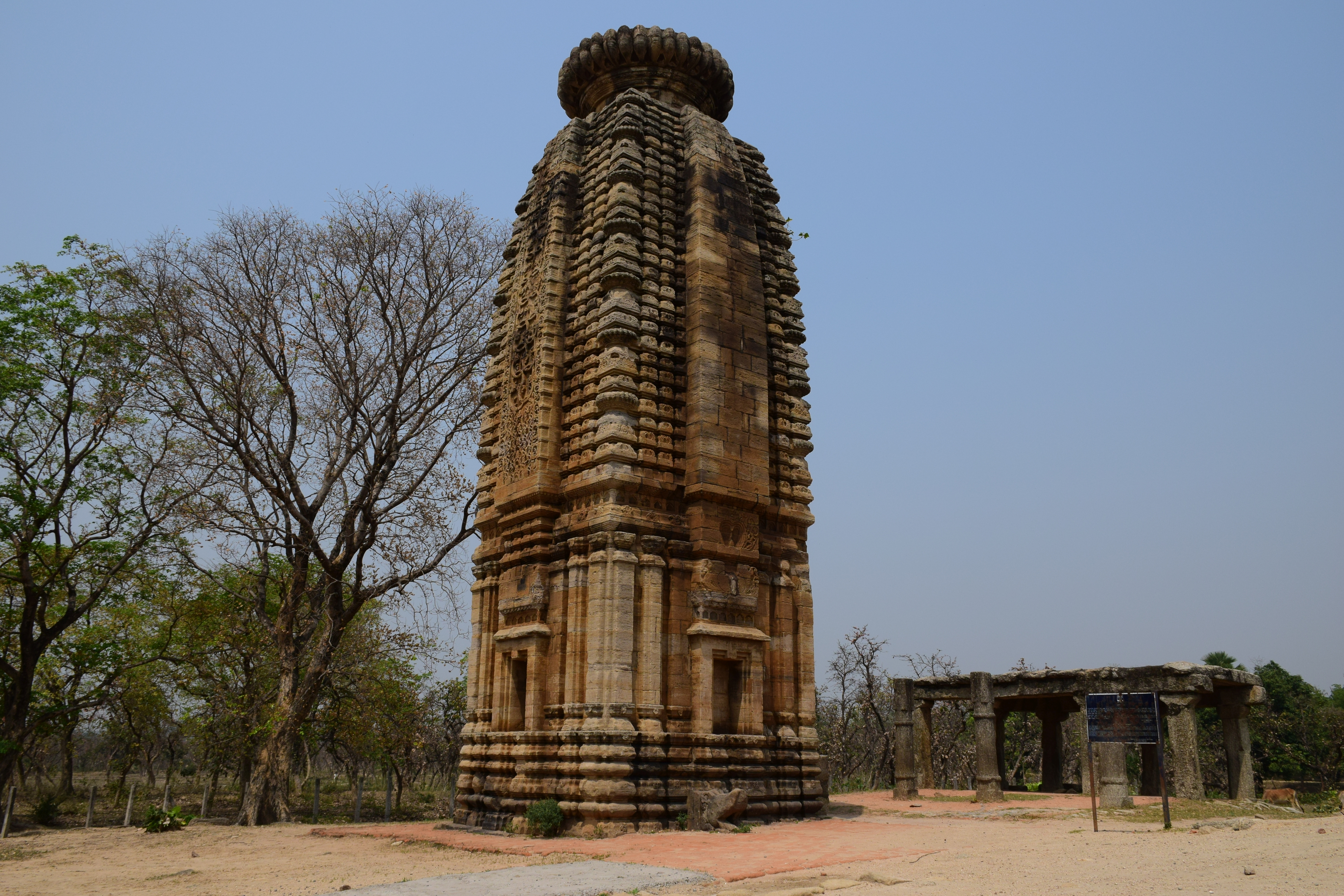
Banda Deul

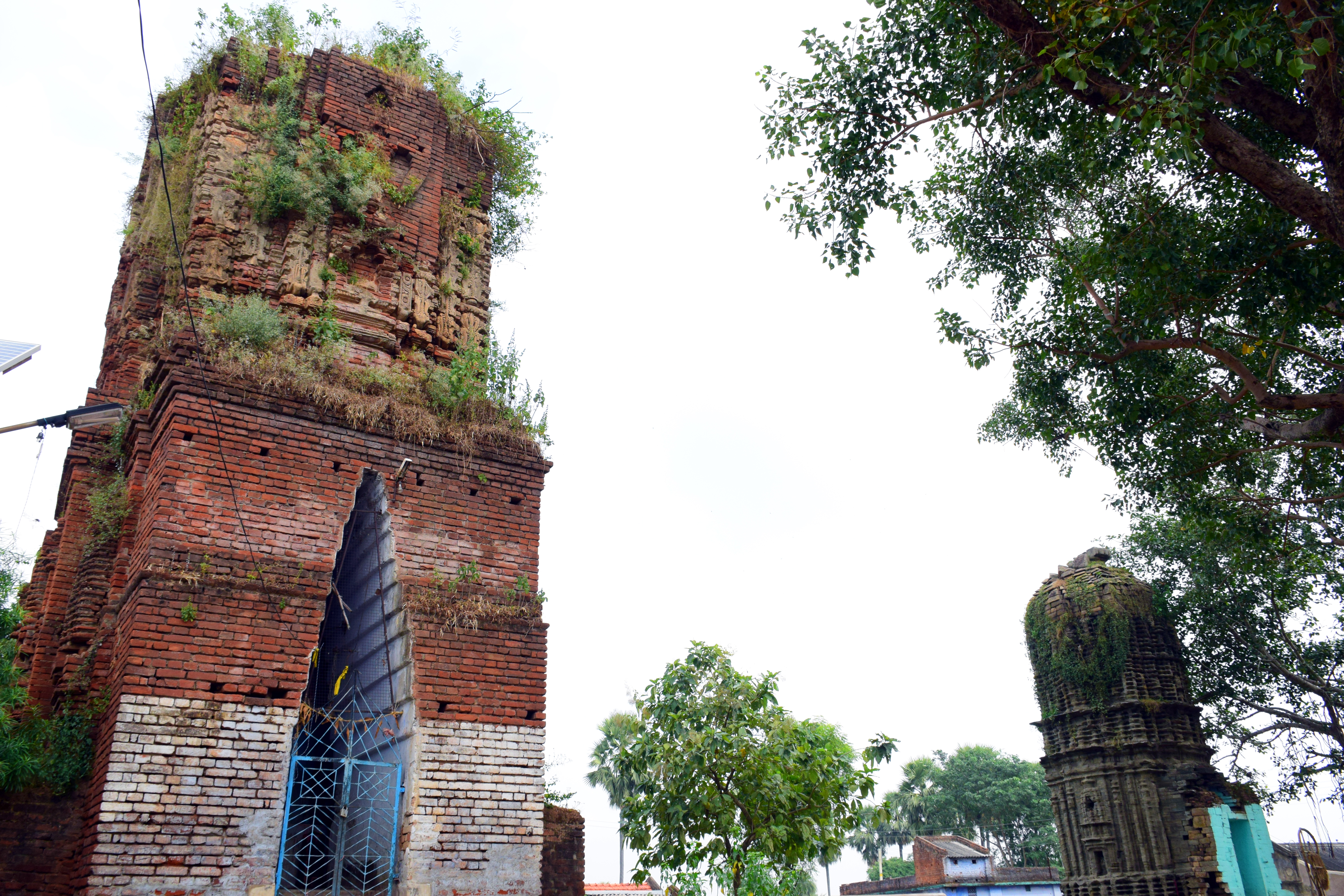
Para Deul, Para

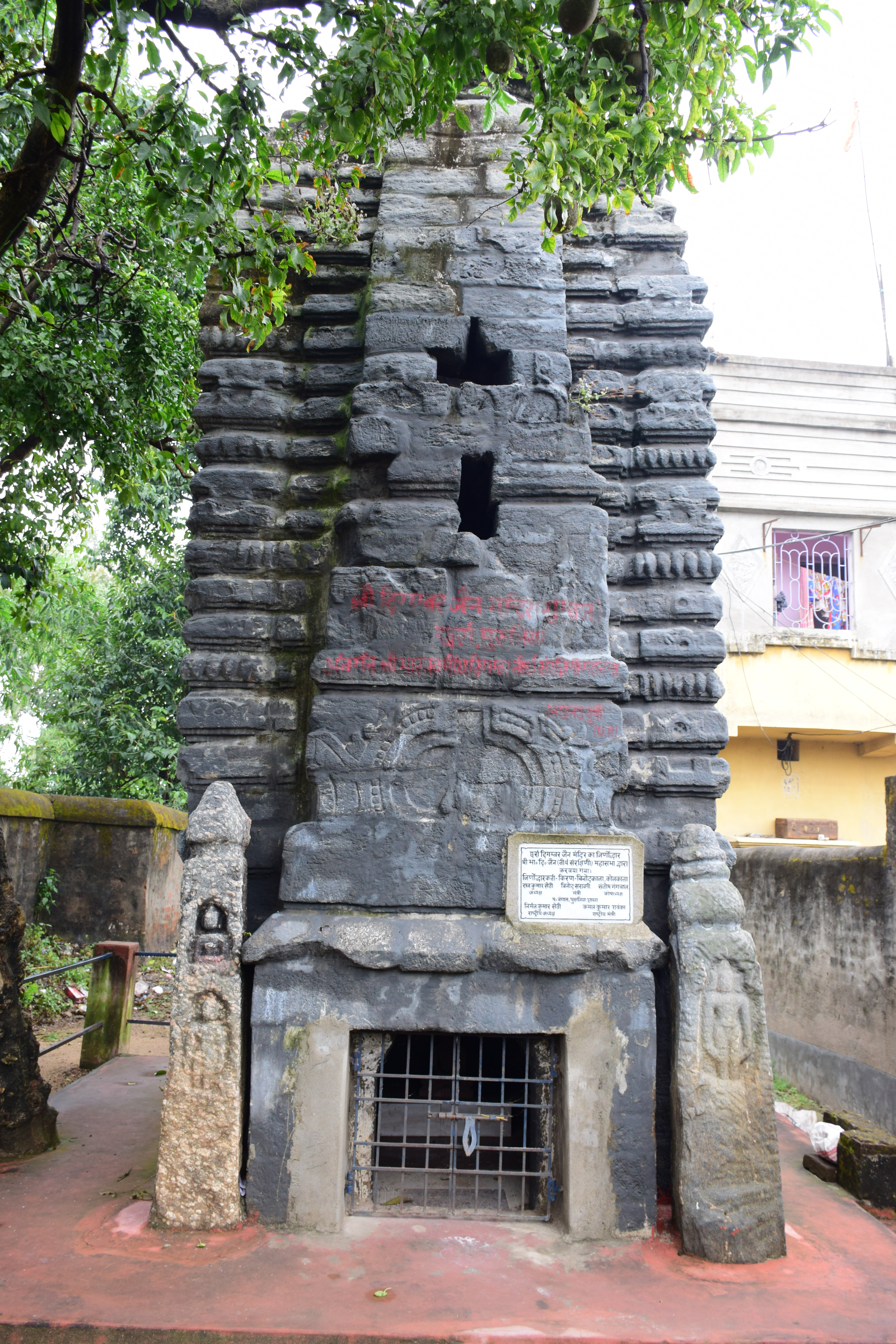
Charara Deul, Chharra

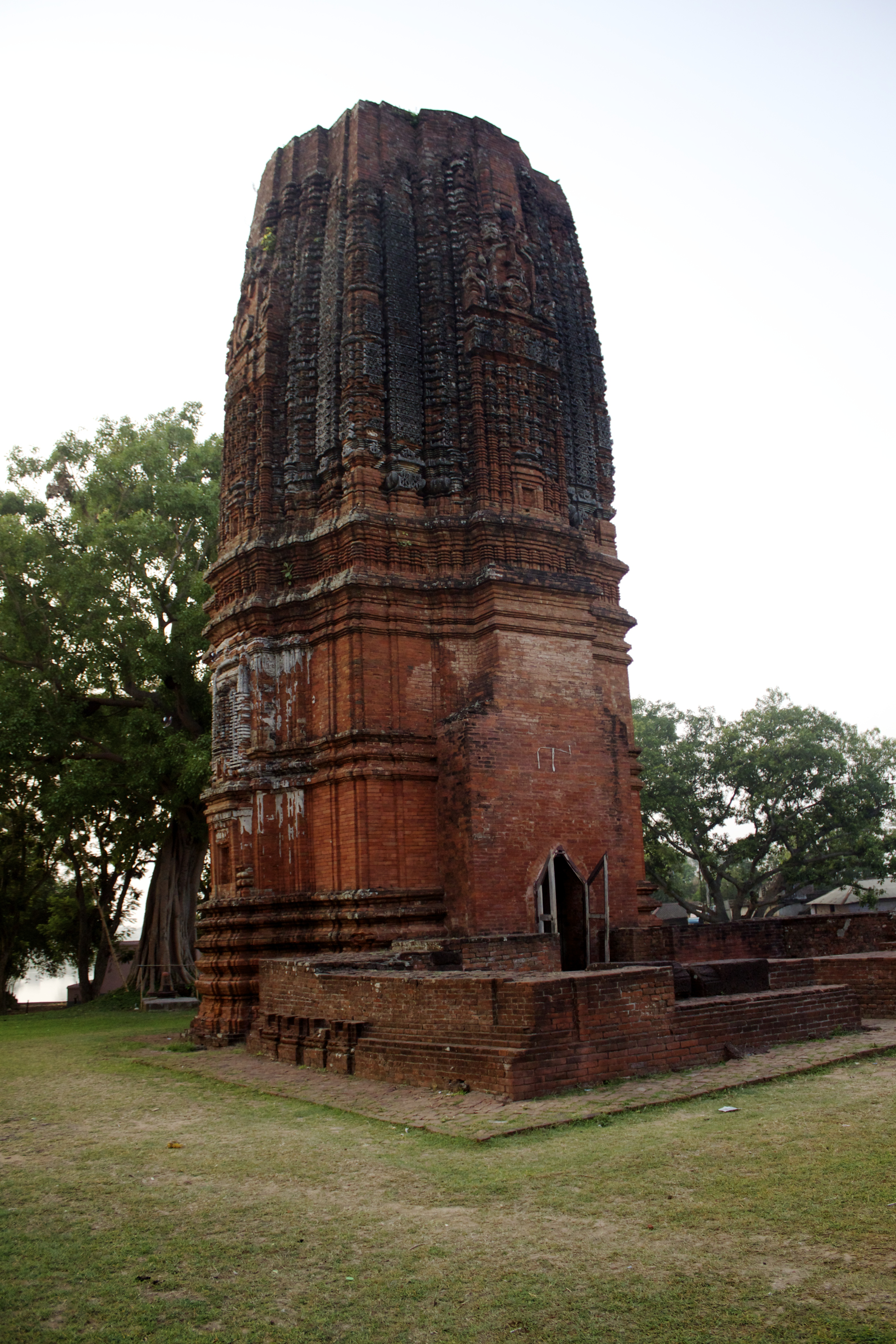
Bahulara Ancient Temple
- Calcutta Jain Temple
- Pakbirra Jain temples
- Kathgola Adinath Temple
- Shree Digambar Jain Pareswanath Temple, Belgachia
- Sat Deul
- Harmasra Jain temple
- Banda Deul
- Bahulara Ancient Temple
- Deulbhira Jain Temple

== Outside India ==
There are a number of Jain temples in various countries outside India.

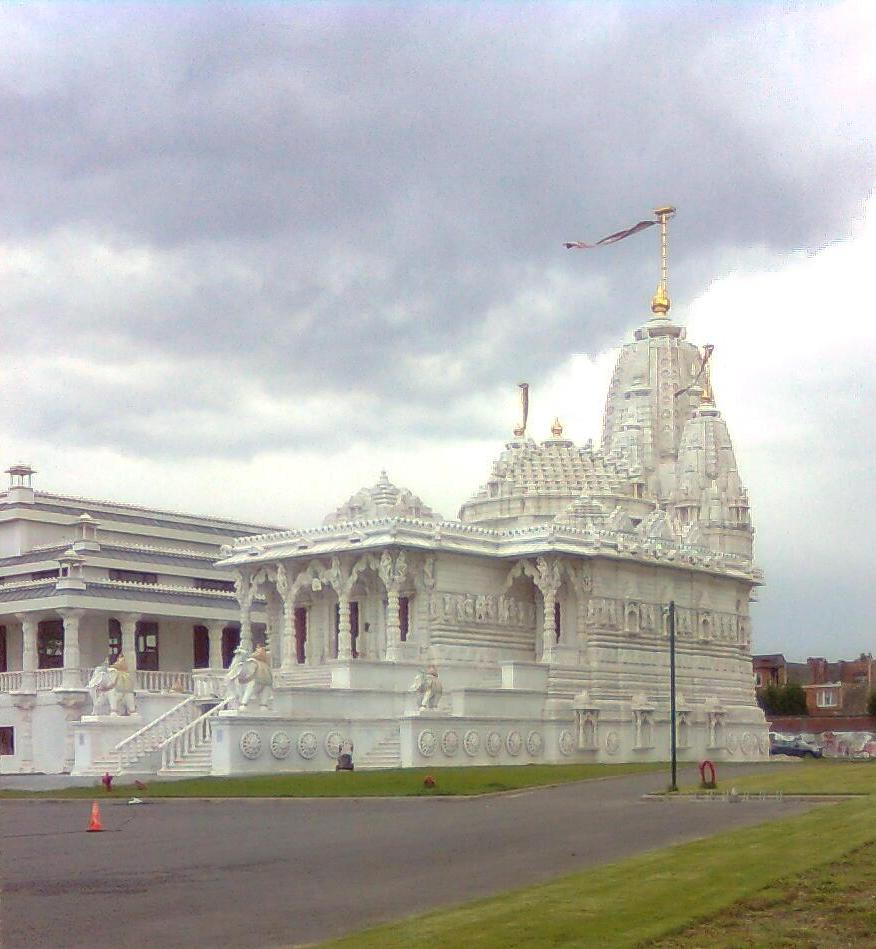
Antwerp Jain temple in Antwerp, Belgium

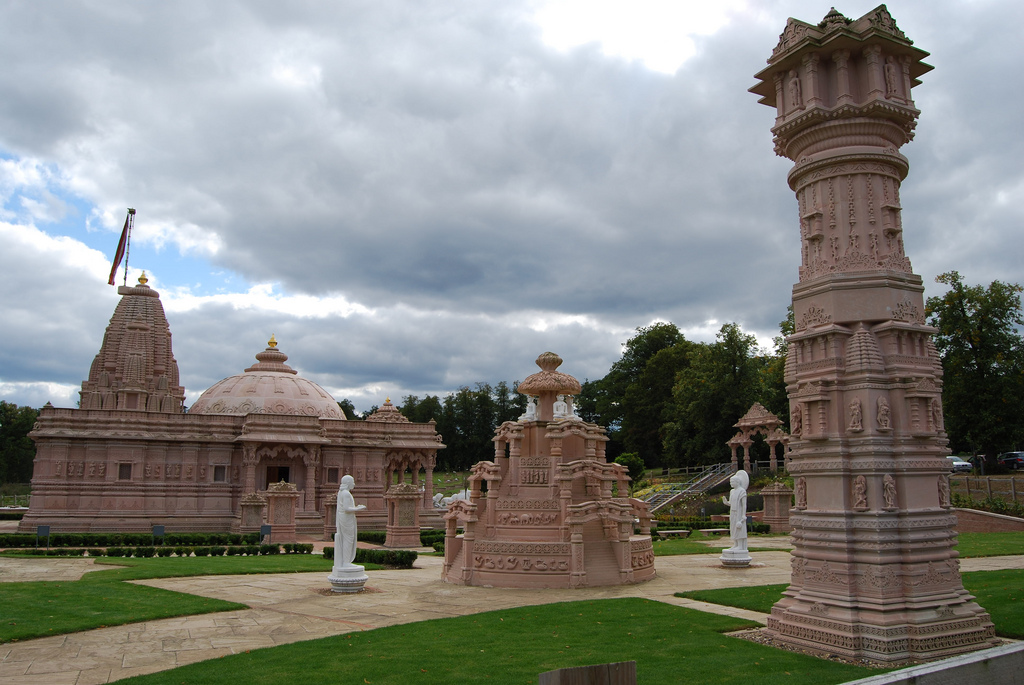
Jain Temple, Pottersbar, Hertfordshire

=== Australia ===
- Jain Temple, Melbourne – 124-126 Rowans Rd, Moorabbin, Victoria 3189 – Melbourne Śvetāmbara Jain Sangh (MSJS)
- Jain Temple, Sydney – Seven Hill Sydney Jain Mandal
- Jain Temple, Sydney – 139 Gilba Rd, Girraween NSW 2145 Vitraag Jain Śvetāmbara Sangh

=== Belgium ===
- Jain temple, Antwerp in Wilrijk, Belgium

=== Canada ===
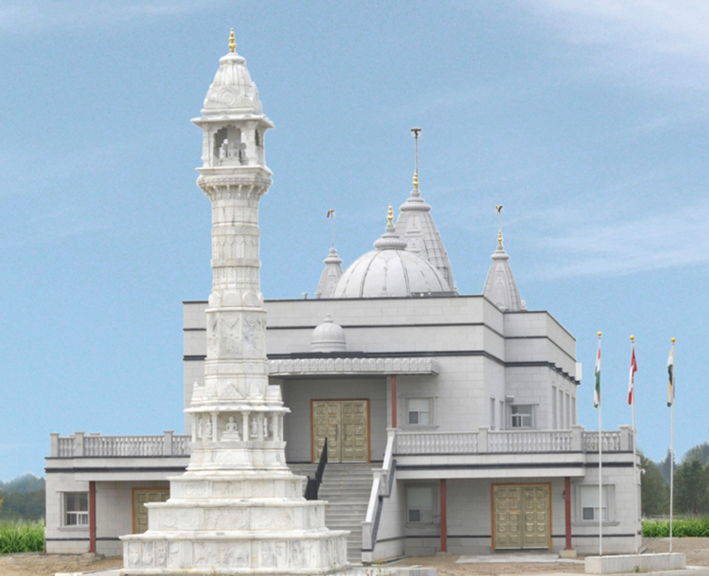
Brampton Jain Temple
- Brampton Jain Temple
- The Jain Society of Toronto has a Śvetāmbara or Swethambar/ Digambar temple in Toronto
- Digambar Temple Shri Jain Mandir in Toronto

=== Hong Kong ===
- Shree Hong Kong Jain Sangh, Tsim Sha Tsui, Hong Kong

=== Japan ===
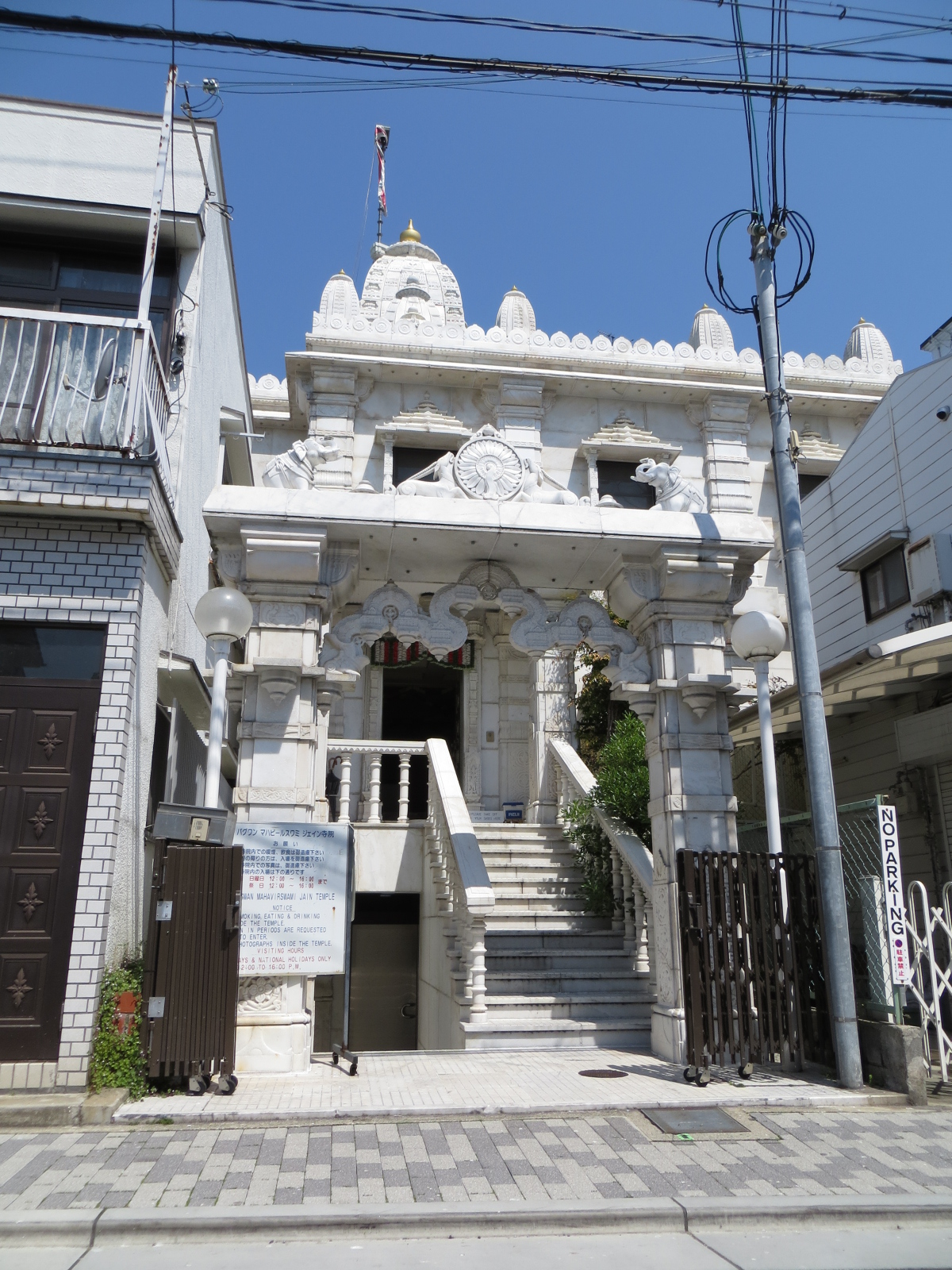
Mahavir swami Jain Temple, Kobe
- Kobe, Japan

=== Kenya ===
- Mombasa Jain temple
- Nairobi Jain temple
- Thika
- Nakuru
- Eldoret

=== Malaysia ===
- Ipoh, Perak
- "First Shikhar Bandhi Jain Deraser" dedicated to Shri Chintamani Parshvanath Bhagawan, Mata Padamavati Devi & Mataji Sarasvati Devi in Ipoh
- Kualalumpur Swetamber Jain Temple – Bangsar

=== Myanmar ===
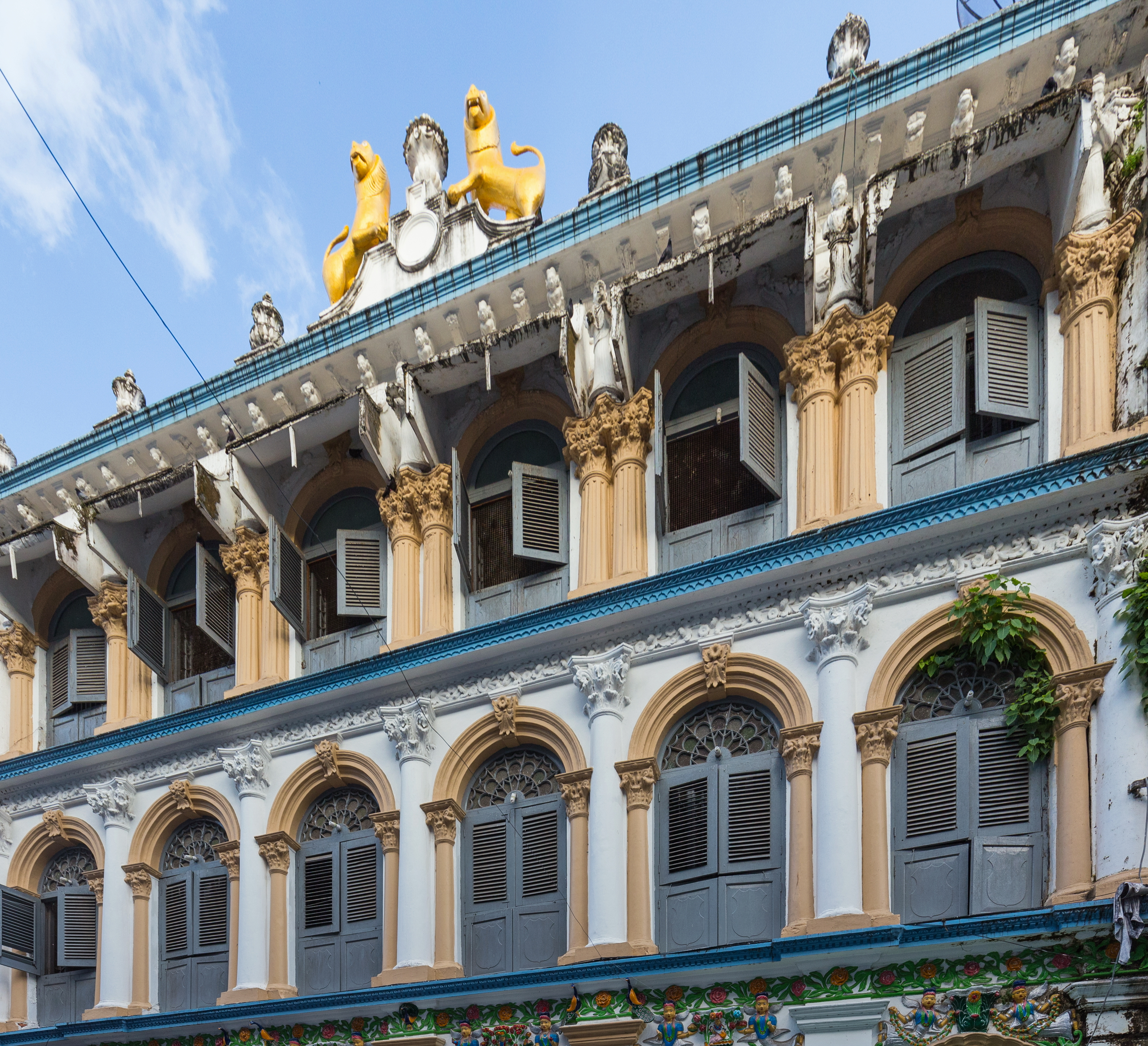
Shree Jain Shwetamber Murtipujak Temple, Yangon

- Shree Jain Shwetamber Murtipujak Temple, 29th Street Yangon

=== Nepal ===
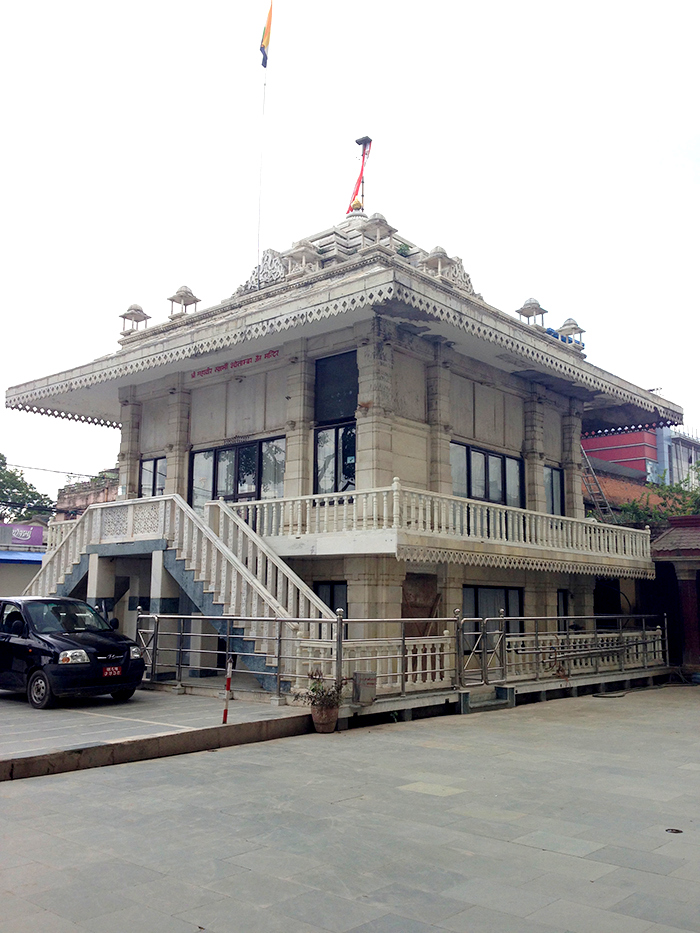
The Jain temple in Kathmandu, Nepal
- Jain Temple, Kathmandu Near Kamal Pokhari Bus Stop, Kathmandu (Nepal)

=== Pakistan ===
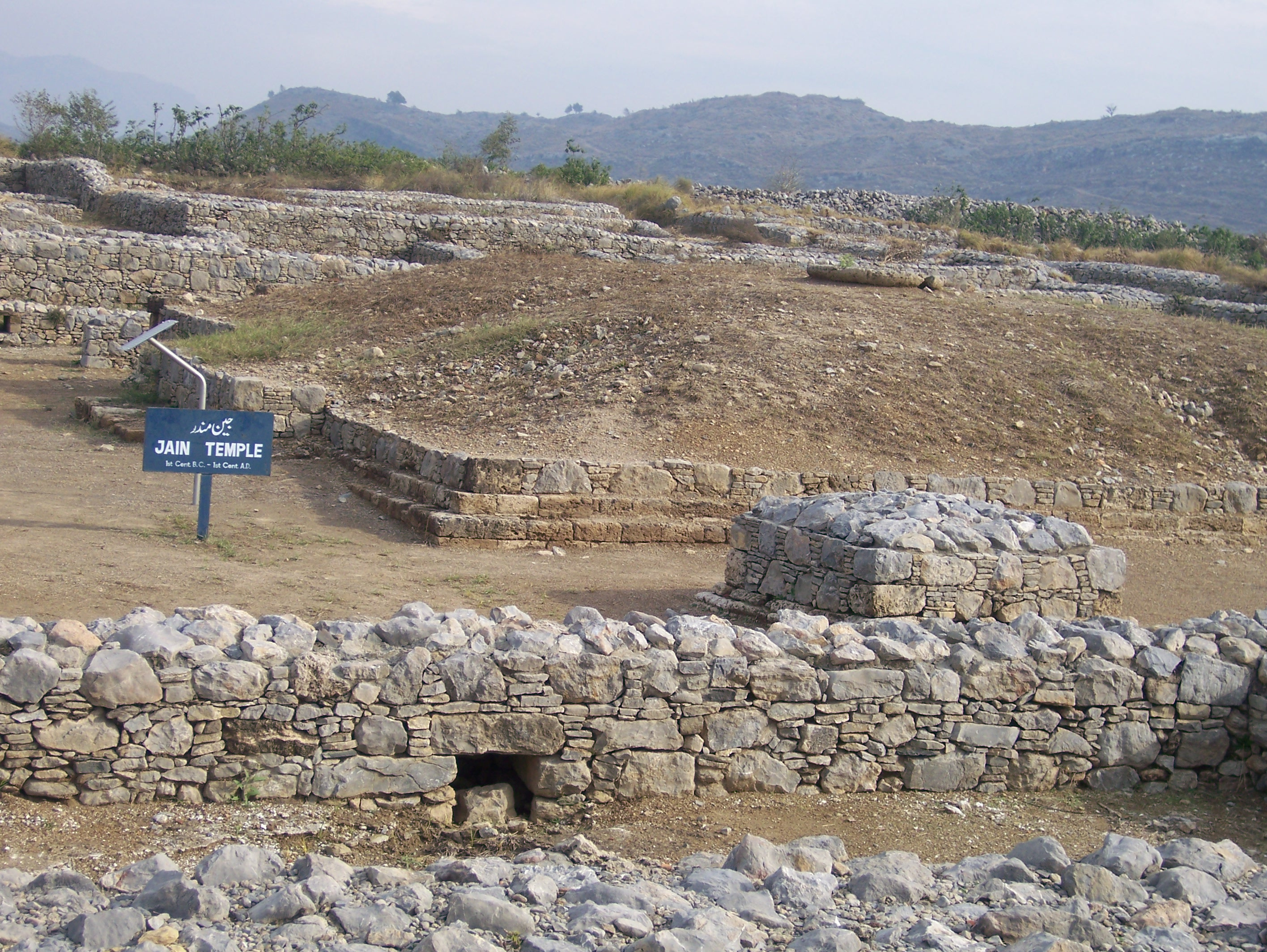
An ancient Jain temple at Sirkap, Taxila, Punjab

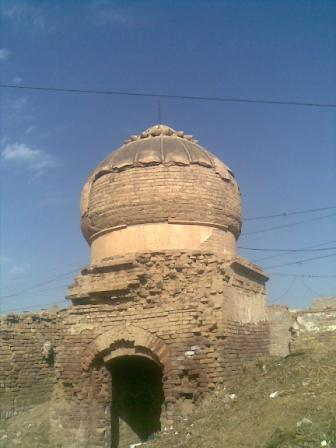
Jain Temple at Dunga Bunga
- Jain Śvetāmbara Temple with Shikhar, Thari Bhabrian Lahore City.
- Jain Digambar Temple with Shikhar, Thari Bhabrian Lahore City.
- Jain Śvetāmbara Dada Wadi (Mini Temple), Guru Mangat in Lahore Cantt., footprints in stone.
- Jain Digambar Temple with Shikhar, Old Anarkali Jain Mandir Chawk: This temple was destroyed in the riots of 1992. Now an Islamic school is run in the former temple.
- Digmabar Jain temple Thar, Pakistan.
- Parshvanath Jain Shwetambar temple, Multan
- Jain Digambar Temple Bohar Gate Multan
- Atmaramji Samadhi, Jain shrine and temple Gujranwala

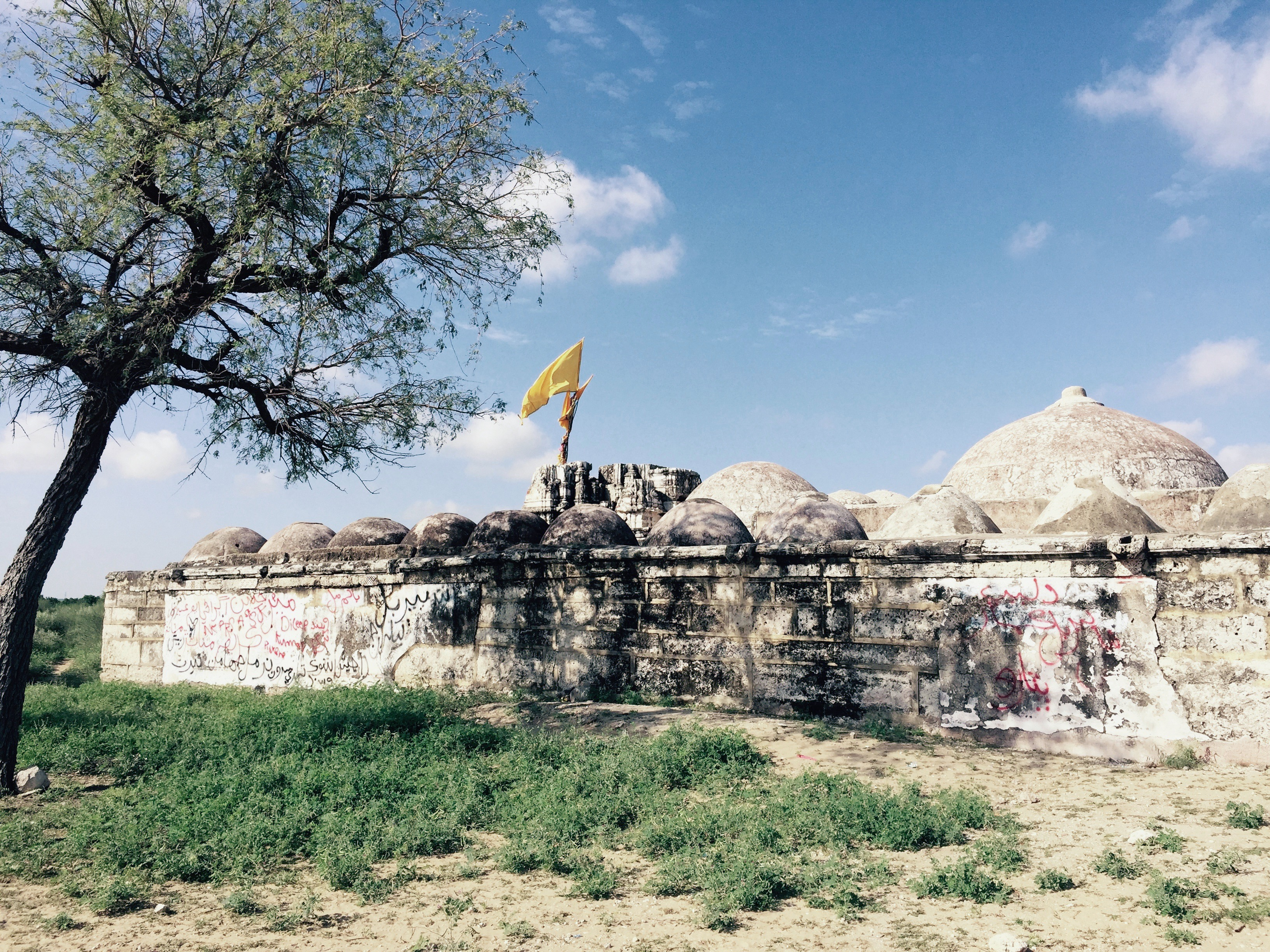
The Gori Temple with 52 domes, Nagarparkar

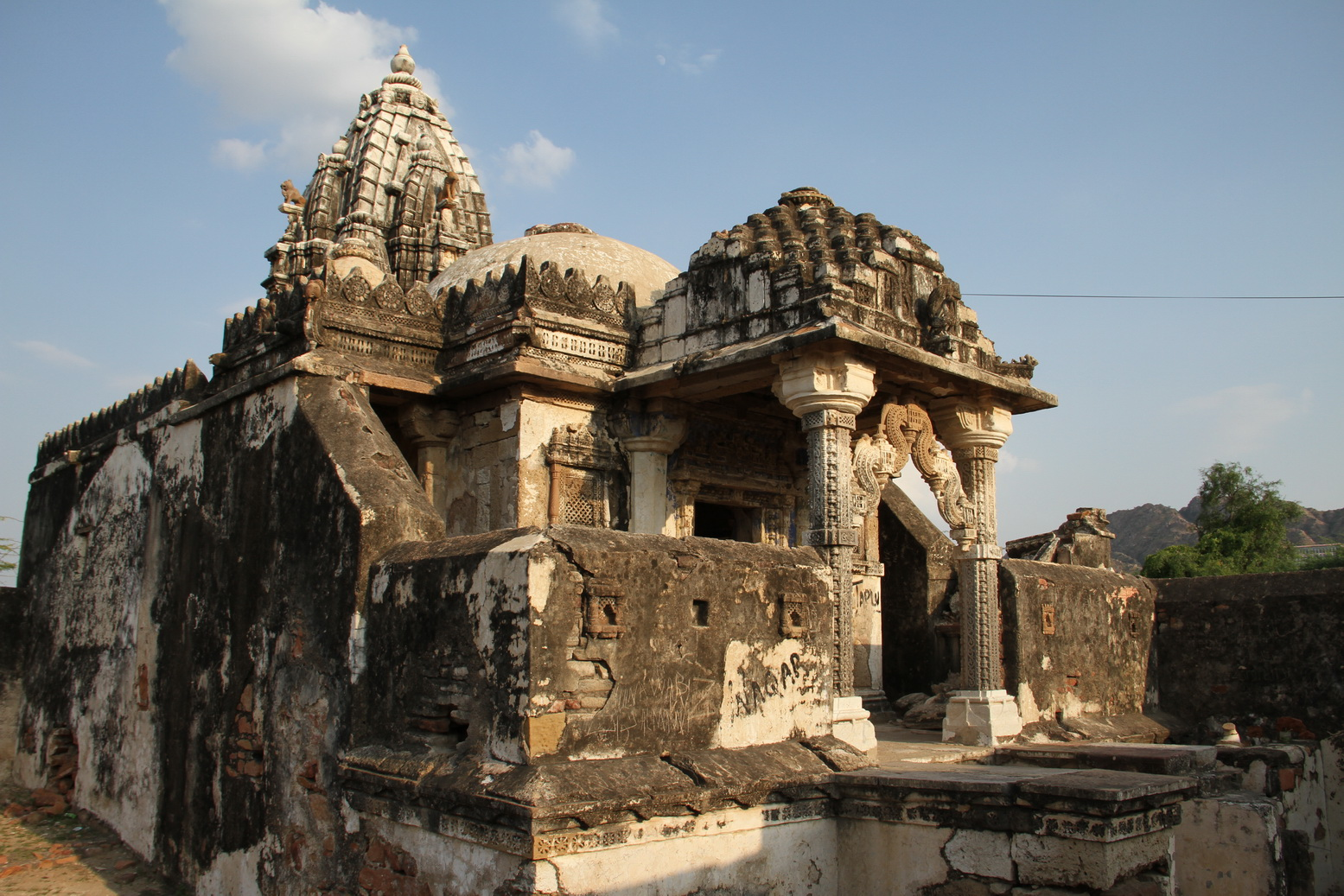
An ancient Jain temple at Nagarparkar

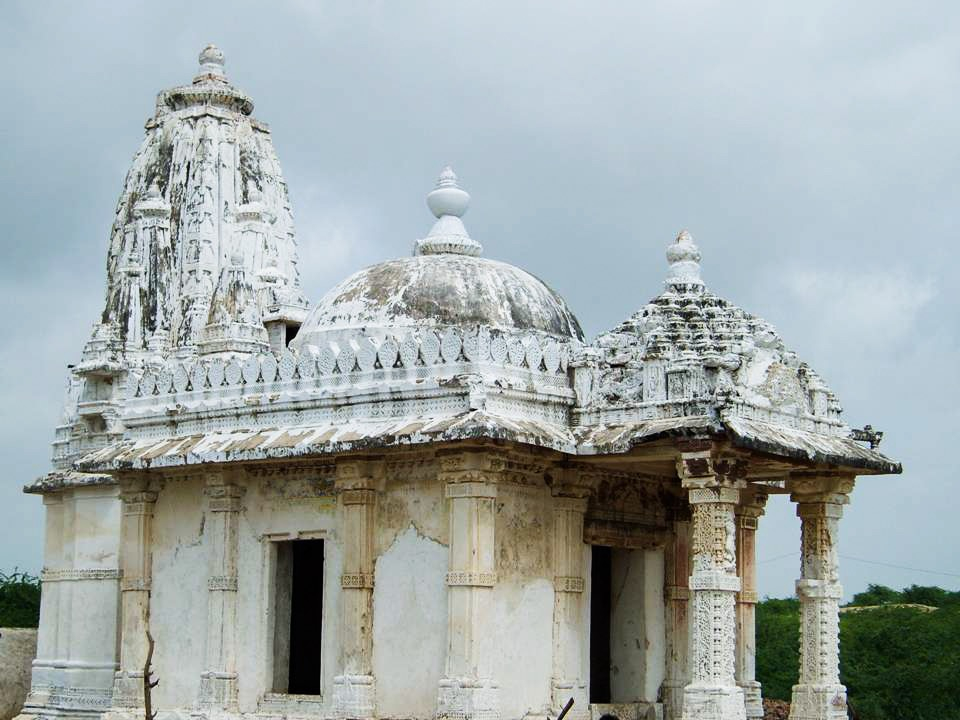
Virawah Jain Temple

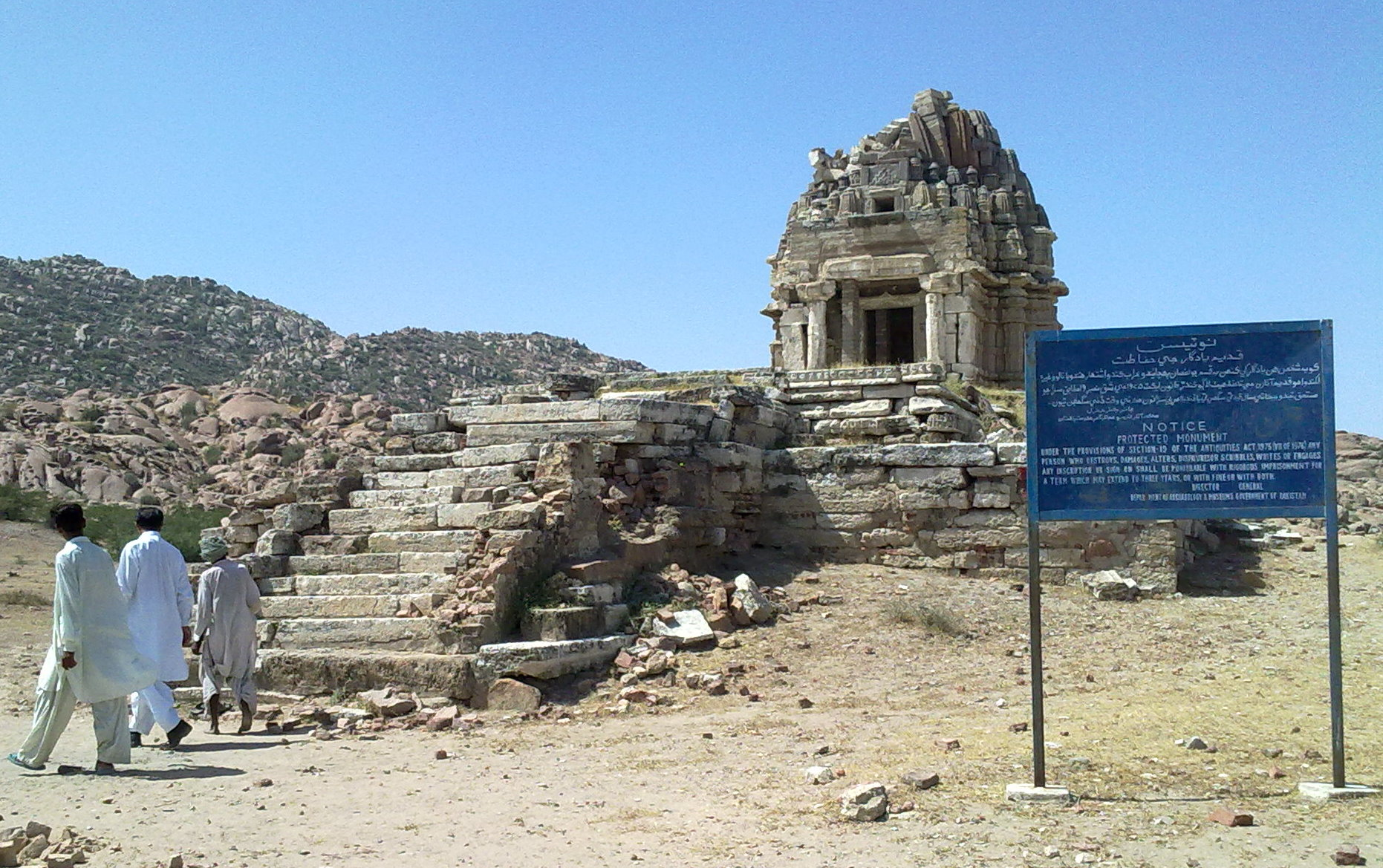
Jain Temple of Bhodesar

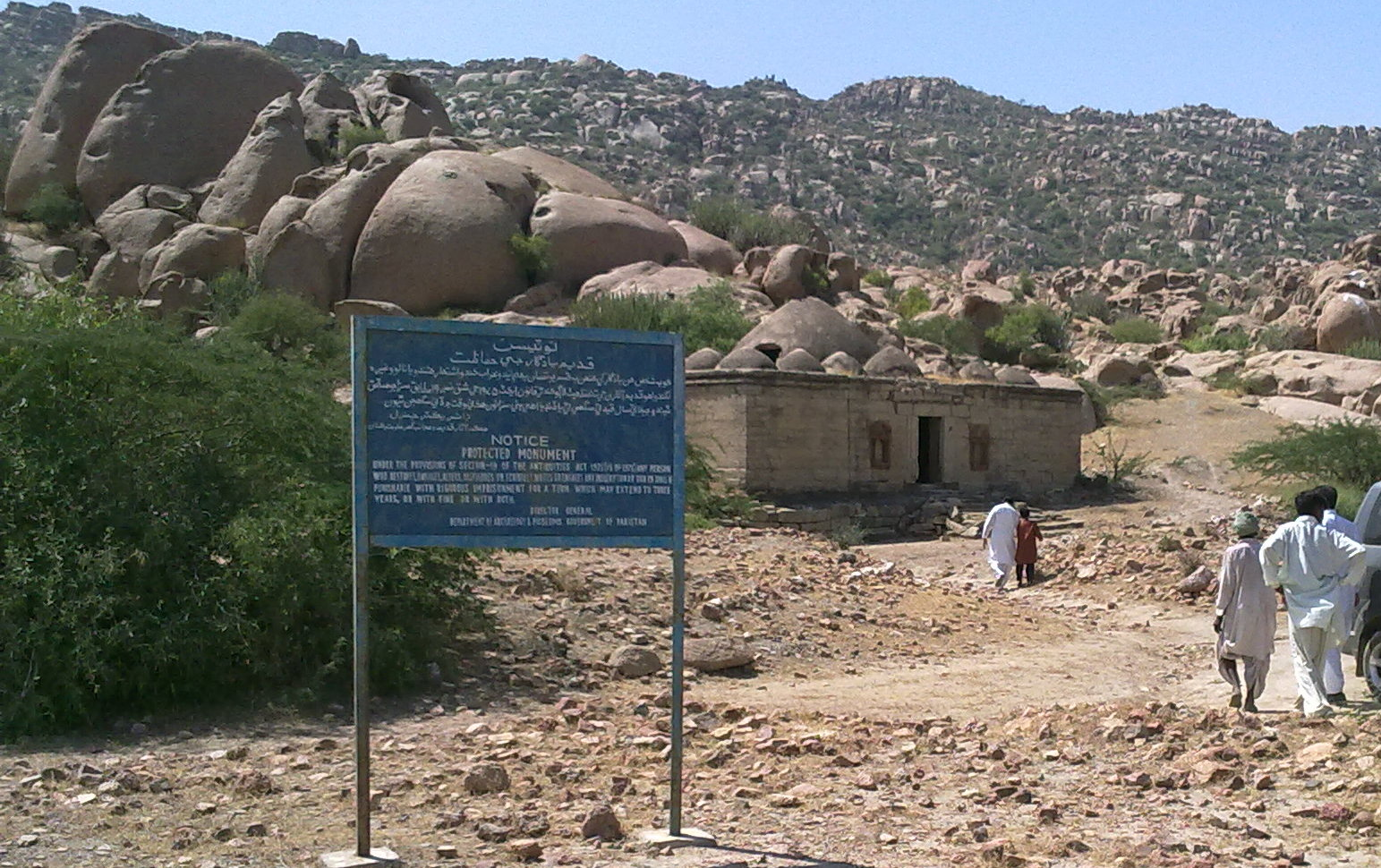
Karoonjar mountain temple
- Nagarparkar Jain Temples
- Gori Temple, Nagarparkar, original site of Godiji Parshwanath
- Jain Shwetamber Temple with Shikhar, Ranchod Line, Karachi
- Jain Shwetamber Temple, Hyderabad

=== Singapore ===
- Jain Temple 18 Jalan Yasin, Singapore

=== Tanzania ===
- Shree Jain Sangh in Dar es Salaam, Tanzania
- Jain Derasar in Arusha, Tanzania
- Zanzibar Derasar in Zanzibar, Tanzania

=== United Arab Emirates ===
- Jain temple, Dubai

=== United Kingdom ===
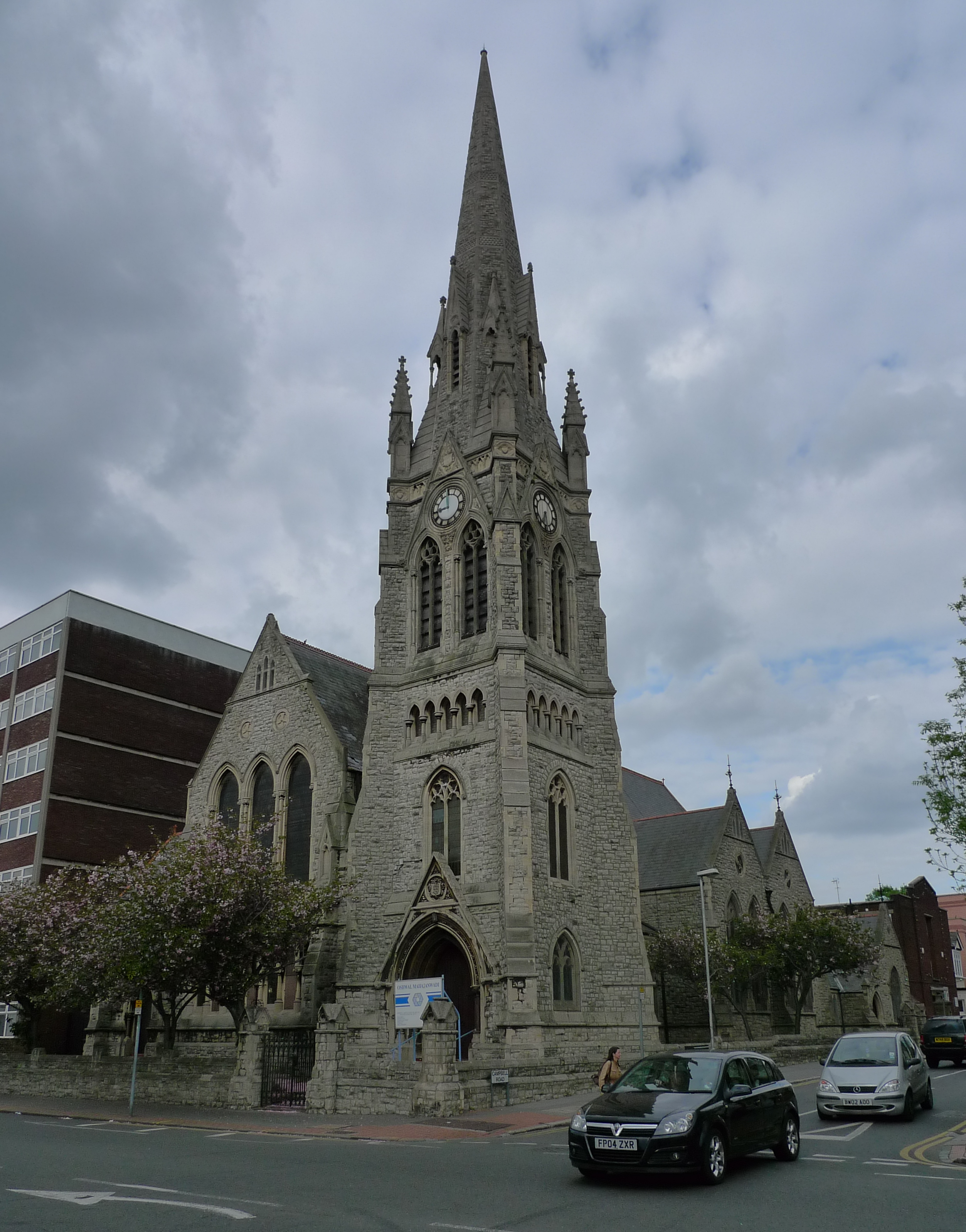
Oshwal Mahajanwadi, Croydon

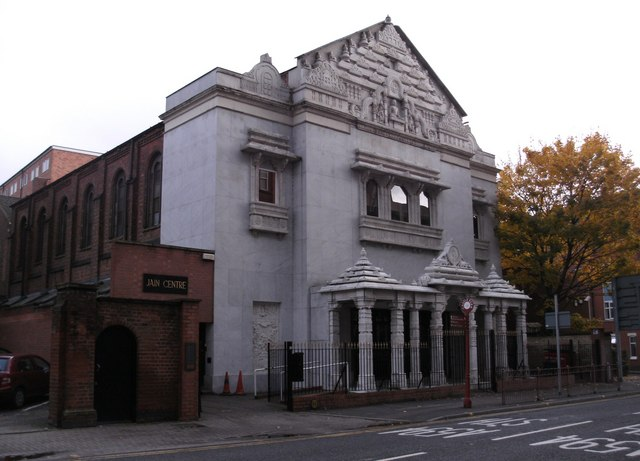
The Jain Centre on Oxford Street, Leicester
- Jain Samaj Potters Bar – Jain temple and community centre
- Shree Mahavir Swami Jain Temple, Harrow, London
- Oshwal Mahajanwadi, Croydon
- Jain Samaj Manchester
- Jain Samaj Leicester and Temple
- Jain Samaj Wellingborough and temple
- Jain Samaj Thornton Heath (Croydon)
- Kailash Giri Jain temple, London
- Oshwal Centre, Hertfordshire. First on virgin ground in Europe.
- Shrimad Rajchandra Mission Dharampur London Spiritual Centre. (Bushey)
- Institute of Jainology at Greenford, London.

=== United States ===
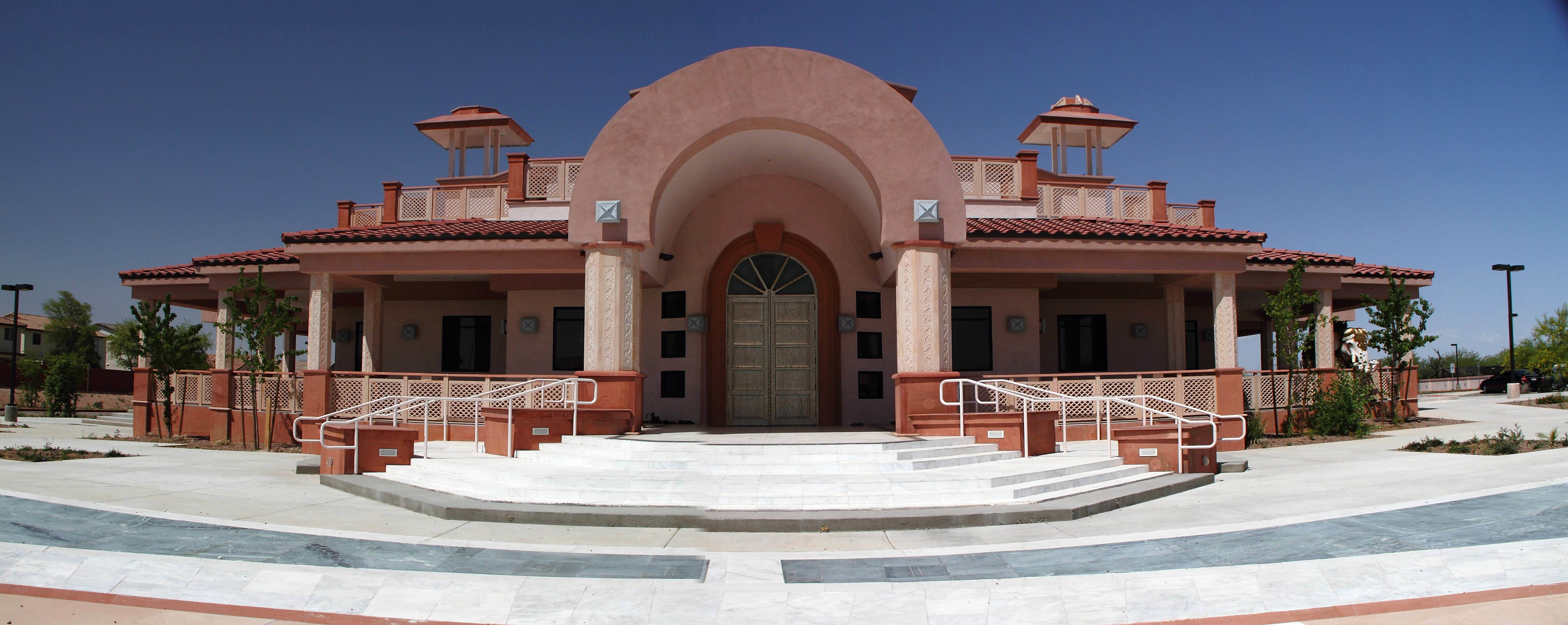
Jain Center of Greater Phoenix (JCGP) in Phoenix, Arizona

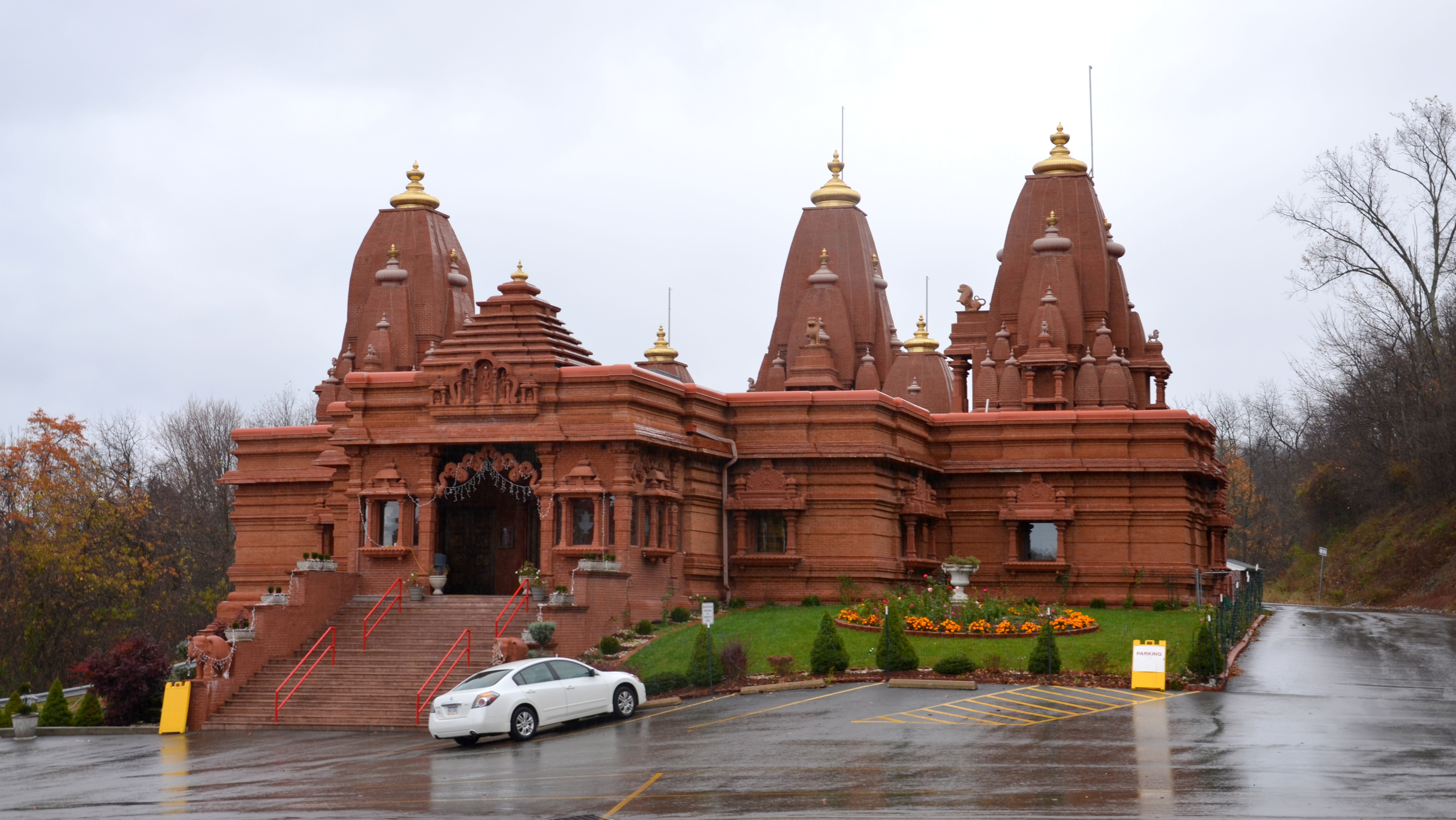
Hindu Jain temple in Monroeville, Pennsylvania

- Franklin Township Derasar, New Jersey
- Hindu Jain temple in Monroeville, Pennsylvania
- Jain Center of America, Elmhurst, Queens, New York City
- Jain Center of Greater Phoenix
- Jain Center of Northern California, Milpitas, CA
- Jain Center of Southern California, Buena Park, CA
- Jain Sangh of New England, Burlington, MA
- Jain Society of Greater Cleveland
- Jain Society of Greater Atlanta
- Jain Society of Metropolitan Chicago
- Jain Society of San Diego, Vista CA
- Jain Society of Seattle
- Jain Religion Center of Wisconsin
- Jain Temple of Greater Detroit – Farmington Hills, Michigan USA
- Jain Temple of Pennsauken Township (Cherry Hill), NJ
- Siddhachalam, New Jersey, USA
- Siddhayatan, Windom near Dallas, Texas
- St. Louis Jain temple

== See also ==
- Jain Temple
- Tirthankara
- List of largest Jain temples
