= Jainism in Bihar =

Jain in Bihar
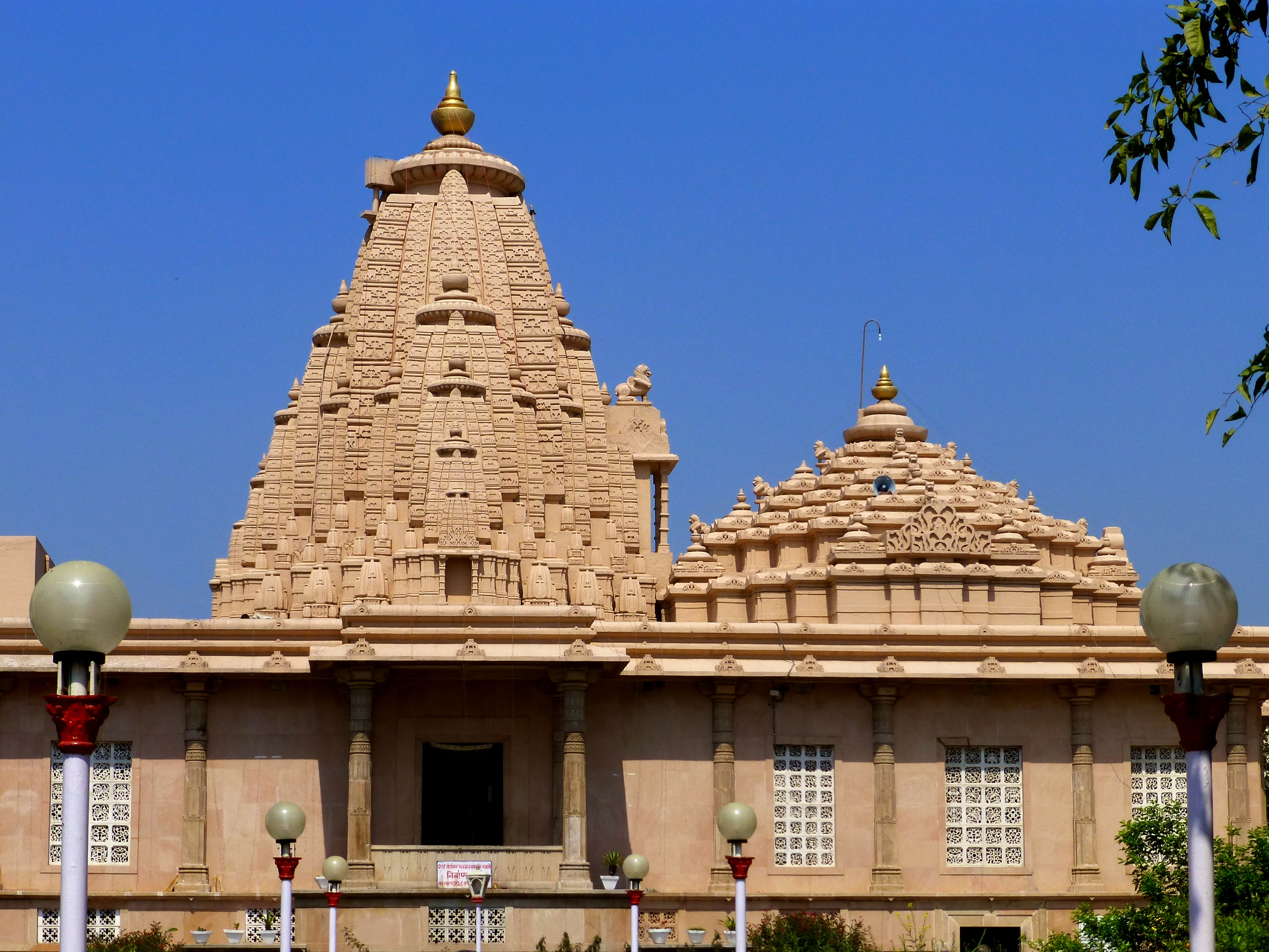
- Jain Temple in Pawapuri. Pawapuri is one of the holiest city of Jainism.

Total population
- '18,914' (0.02%) (2011)

Regions with significant populations
- Most significant populations in Patna · Rajgir

Languages
- Bhojpuri, Magahi

Religion
- Jainism

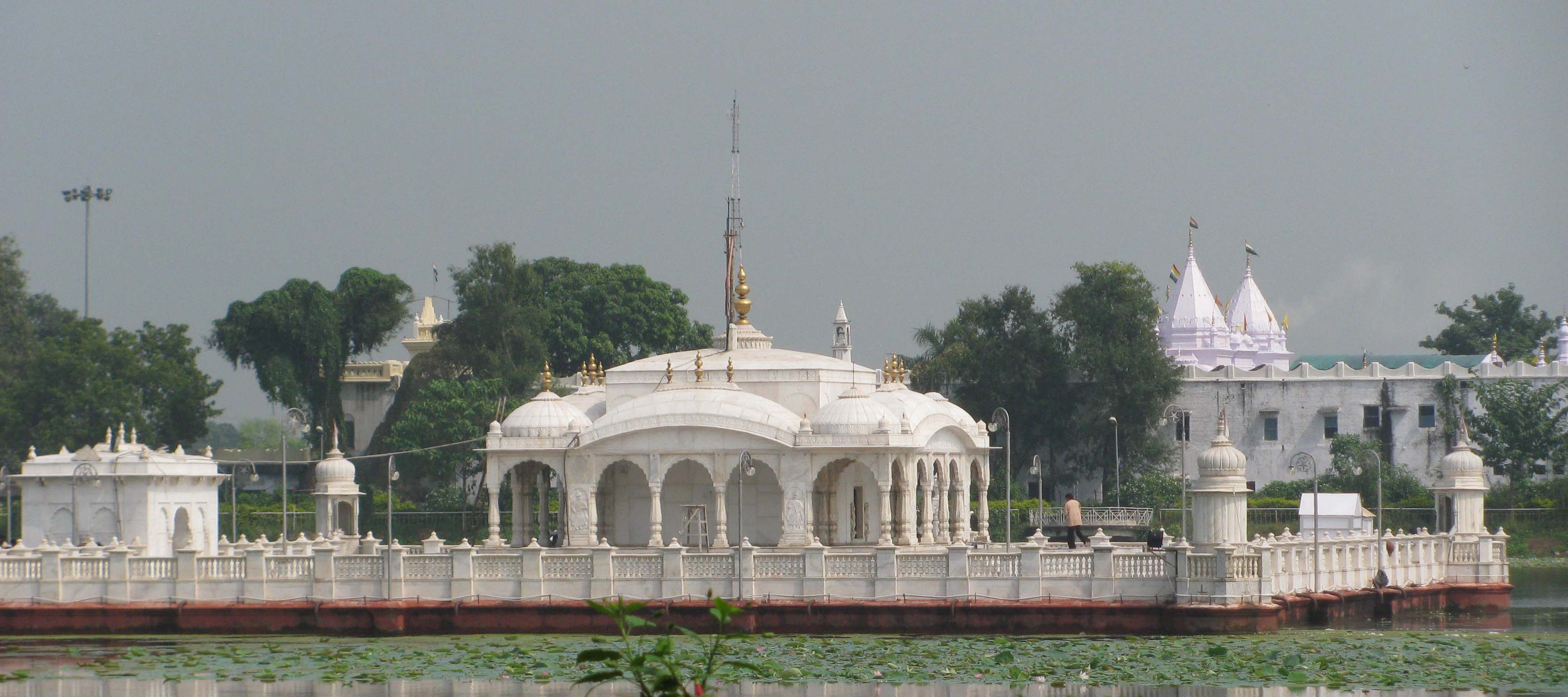
The famous Jain temple Jal Mandir located at Pawapuri, Bihar

Jainism in Bihar trace a long history since the times of twenty-fourth Tirthankara Mahavira, who was born in Vaishali (near Hajipur). The state of Bihar is considered to have played an important role in the development of Jainism.

== History ==
Vasupujya, the 12th Jain Tirthankara was born in Champapur, Bhagalpur and attained all his Pancha Kalyanaka in Champapuri. Munisuvrata, the 20th Jain tirthankara was born in Rajgir. Vardhamana Mahavira, the 24th and the last Tirthankara of Jainism, was born in Vaishali around sixth century B.C. His father was Kshatriya from Ikshvaku Dynasty chief of Kundalpur which has been identified with modern-day Nalanda district. Mahavir achieved nirvana in Pawapuri which is today a pilgrimage site for Jains from across the world. An ancient black statue of Lord Mahavira weighing around 250 kg was recently stolen from Jamui, Bihar. The statue was later recovered by the Police.

== Nālandā ==
- The 24th Jaina Tirthankara Mahāvīra is said to have spent 'many Cāturmāsyas (rainy seasons)' at Nālandā. Canonical scriptures of the Śvetāmbara sect also mention that Nālandā was known by other names such as Nālandāpada and Nālandā Sanniveśa. The texts further highlight that it was a suburb of Rājagṛha. Mahāvīra is said to have had met Makkhali-gosāla, the leader of the Ājīvakas, for the first time at Nālandā.
- Jaina tradition records that some of Mahāvīra’s Gaṇadharas (disciples), namely Indrabhūti Gautama, Agnibhūti Gautama, and Vāyubhūti Gautama were born in Nālandā.
- Sūtrakṛtāṅga Sūtra, a canonical Jaina scripture, contains a lecture (Book 2, Lecture 7) narrating a conversation about non-violence between Indrabhūti Gautama and Lepa, a Jaina householder in Nālandā.
- Majjhima Nikāya, an ancient Buddhist text, mentions that Mahāvīra had visited Nālandā along with many of his followers.
- Vividha Tīrtha Kalpa, a 14th-century text by Ācārya Jinaprabhasūri, mentions that Mahāvīra completed 14 rainy seasons at Nālandā and that 'it is the source of all beauty'.
- In his travel chronicle written in 1509 CE, Jaina monk, Muni Hansasomavijaya mentions the presence of 16 Jaina temples in Nālandā. Panyās Jayavijaya states the presence of 17 Jaina temples by 1608 CE in the region. However, by 1694 CE, most of the temples were destroyed and Panyās Saubhāgyavijaya records the presence of a temple and a stūpa only.
- The ASIGoI report of 1861 mentions the presence of a Jaina temple in the premises of the ruins of Nālandā University. It was found to have had the same architecture style as seen in the Great Temple at Bodha Gayā and was dated to 5th century CE. The temple was found to have Jaina images and sculptures dated to 1447 CE.
- The Indian Antiquary (1918) mentions that the Jaina temple found within the ruins of Nālandā is the oldest temple in the region.
- According to Muni Nyāyavijaya (c. 1949), there were 2 Jaina temples and at least 100 Jaina images at Nālandā.
- The Indian Archaeology (1955-56) also mentions the recovery of a Jaina image from Nālandā.
- Currently, the Śvetāmbara Jaina temple at Nālandā shares a wall with the ruins of Nālandā University and has ancient Jaina images dated to as early as the 10th century CE. The principal idol of the temple is an image of Ṛṣabhanātha, the 1st Jaina Tirthankara. It features unique iconography depicting Marudevī, his mother, on top of his head. The image also features elongated hairlocks, typically seen in Śvetāmbara Jaina iconography of Ṛṣabhanātha. Other ancient images include idols of Śāntinātha, the 16th Jaina Tirthankara, Mahāvīra, the 24th Jaina Tirthankara and of Pārśvanātha, the 23rd Jaina Tirthankara. Ancient footprints of Indrabhūti Gautama and other Gaṇadharas are also present in a separate temple in the same premises.

== Jain Pilgrimage ==
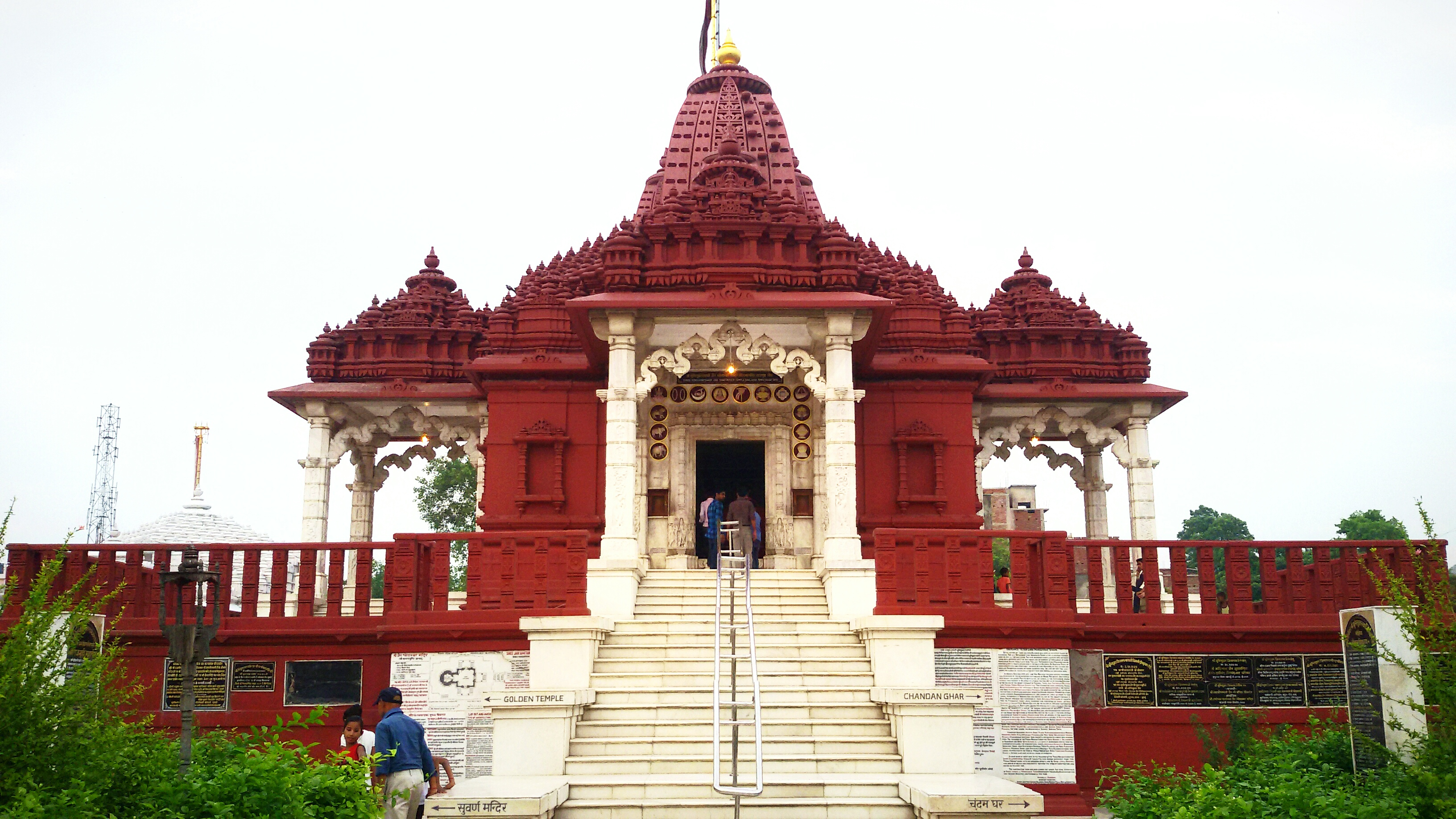
Naulakha Mandir, Rajgir

Pataliputra, Champapuri and Vaishali are significant religious places in Jainism. Kamaldah Jain Temple is the oldest Jain temple in Patna built in the 18th century. This temple, belonging to the Śvetāmbara sect of Jainism, is dedicated to Neminatha, the 22nd tirthankara. It is believed to be built on the site where Jain acharya Sthulabhadra (297—198 BCE) spent his last days. Sthulabhadra, a major preceptor of Śvētāmbara sect of Jainism, was the successor of Bhadrabahu The temple was built in 1729 CE (V.S. 1848) to commemorate the Sthulabhadra. The temple houses an inscription dating back to 1792 CE.

=== Temples ===
- Jal Mandir, Pawapuri
- Jain temples, Rajgir
- Lachhuar Jain temple
- Champapur Jain Temple
- Arrah Jain temple
- Mithilapuri Jain Teerth

=== Siddha Kshetra ===
- Siddha Kshetra Kamaldahji
- Siddha Kshetra Mandargiri
- Siddha Kshetra, Kundalpur
- Rajgir
- Siddha Kshsetra Gunawaji

=== Ancient Jain City ===
- Rajgir
- Champapuri
- Vasupujya

== Demography ==
Historical Jain Population
Year	Pop.	±%
1951	-	—
1961	-	—
1971	-	—
1981	-	—
1991	-	—
2001	16,085	—
2011	18,914	+17.6%
Source: Census of India

Jainism is a minority religion of Bihar, being practiced by 0.2% of the total state population. The Jain population in Bihar is 18,914 as of 2011 census report. As per 2001 census, Only 16,085 Jain were living in Bihar.

== Sources ==
- Dalal, Roshen (2010) [2006]. The Religions of India: A Concise Guide to Nine Major Faiths. Penguin books. ISBN 978-0-14-341517-6.
- Singh, Pradyuman (2018). Bihar General Knowledge Digest. New Delhi: Prabhat Prakashan. ISBN 978-93-52667-69-7.
- Sinha, Nishi (1999). Tourism Perspective in Bihar. New Delhi: APH Publishing. ISBN 978-81-70249-75-7.
- Wood, Michael (2015). The Story of India. Michael Wood: The Story of India. BBC Books. ISBN 9781448141463.
