= Son Bhandar Caves =

Artificial caves in Bihar, India

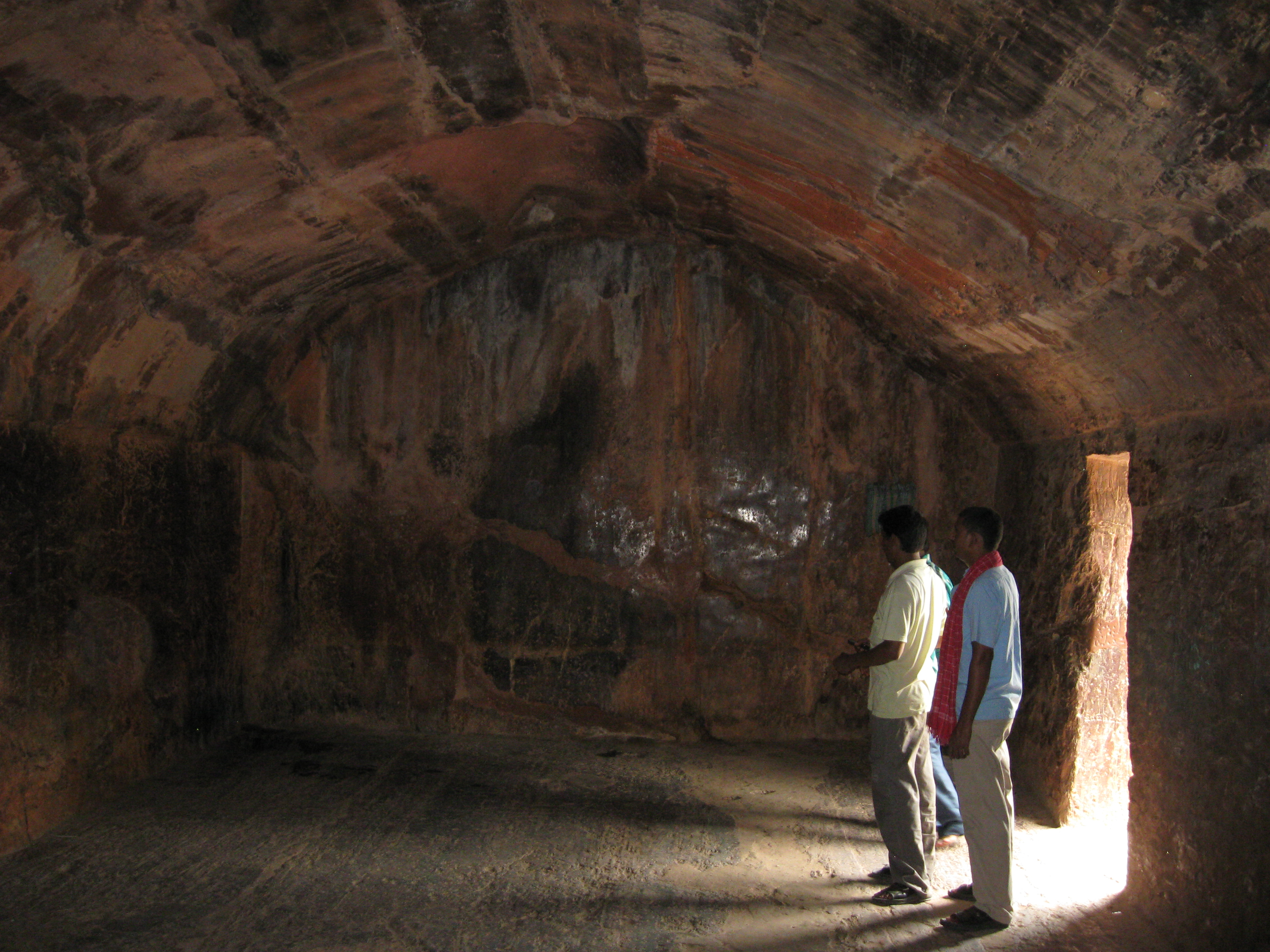
- Main cave of Son Bhandar with ceiling in Ogive.

- Location within India
- Location: Rajgir
- Coordinates: 25°00′15″N 85°25′00″E

The Son Bhandar Caves (also known as the Swarn Bhandar Caves) are two Jain man-made caves carved into the base of the Vaibhar Hills in Rajgir in the state of Bihar in India. Based on the dedicatory inscription found in the largest cave — which uses Gupta script of the 4th century CE — the caves are generally dated to the 3rd or 4th century CE, although some authors have suggested the caves could actually go back to the period of the Maurya Empire, possibly as early as 319 BCE. The main cave is rectangular with a trapezoidal entrance and a vaulted ceiling, reminiscent of the structure of the earlier Barabar Caves. The quality of the polish and the finish are nevertheless much inferior to that of the Barabar Caves. The stone of Son Bhandar is also much less hard than the granite of the Barabar caves, and therefore did not require the same degree of effort and technique.

== Dedicatory inscription of the 4th century CE ==
An inscription in the rock at the entrance of the cave in Gupta characters of the 4th century CE mentions the construction of the cellar by a Jain Muni ("Monk") named Vairadeva. This inscription has led scholars to date the cave to the same period of the 4th century CE.:

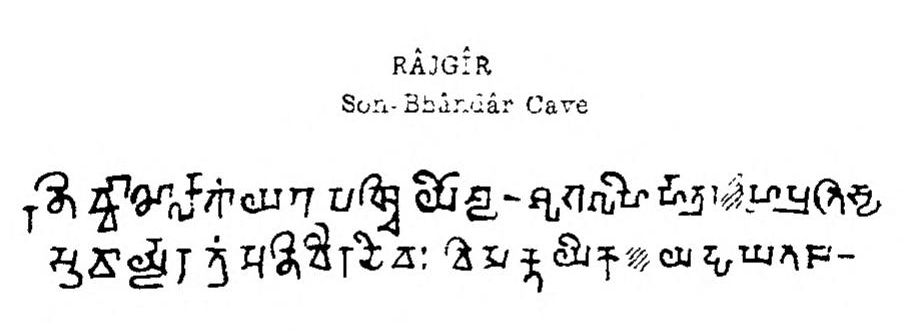
Original inscription in Gupta script.

Muni Vairadeva, the jewel among the acaryas and of great lustre, caused to be made the two auspicious caves which are worthy of ascetics and in which were placed the images of arhats (ie tirthankaras)

— Inscription of the main Son Bhandar cave (4th century CE).

According to Gupta, however, this inscription may be ambiguous and, for him, might only mean that the cave was the subject of re-development work at that time. For this reason, he tends to date the cave on the basis of its similarities with the caves of Barabar (general shape, trapezoidal entrance door, polishing, although extremely limited) to the time of Ashoka (260 BCE), or even a little earlier, making it the possible precursor of all artificial caves in India such as the Barabar Caves. Le Huu Phuoc also entertains the possibility, to challenge the traditional idea that stone mirror-polishing techniques were imported from the Near East. The consensus, however, favours the traditional datation of 2nd to 4th century of our era, based on the epigraphic evidence.

The ancient Saptaparni Cave, a natural cave dating back to the days of the Buddha, is only a few kilometers away.

== Main Cave ==
The cave dates were constructed c. 319 — 180 BCE, during the Maurya Empire. The Chaumukha (quadruple) idol discovered inside the cave has a domical top and the stele on each side shows a dharmachakra. Each side has carvings representing the animal symbols of the respective tirthankara - Ajitanatha with two elephants flank the wheel, Sambhavanatha with two monkeys, Shantinatha, with two deer and Rishabhanatha with chawri bearers on each side and a flying garland-bearer over the head. This idol dates to the 7th or 8th century CE.

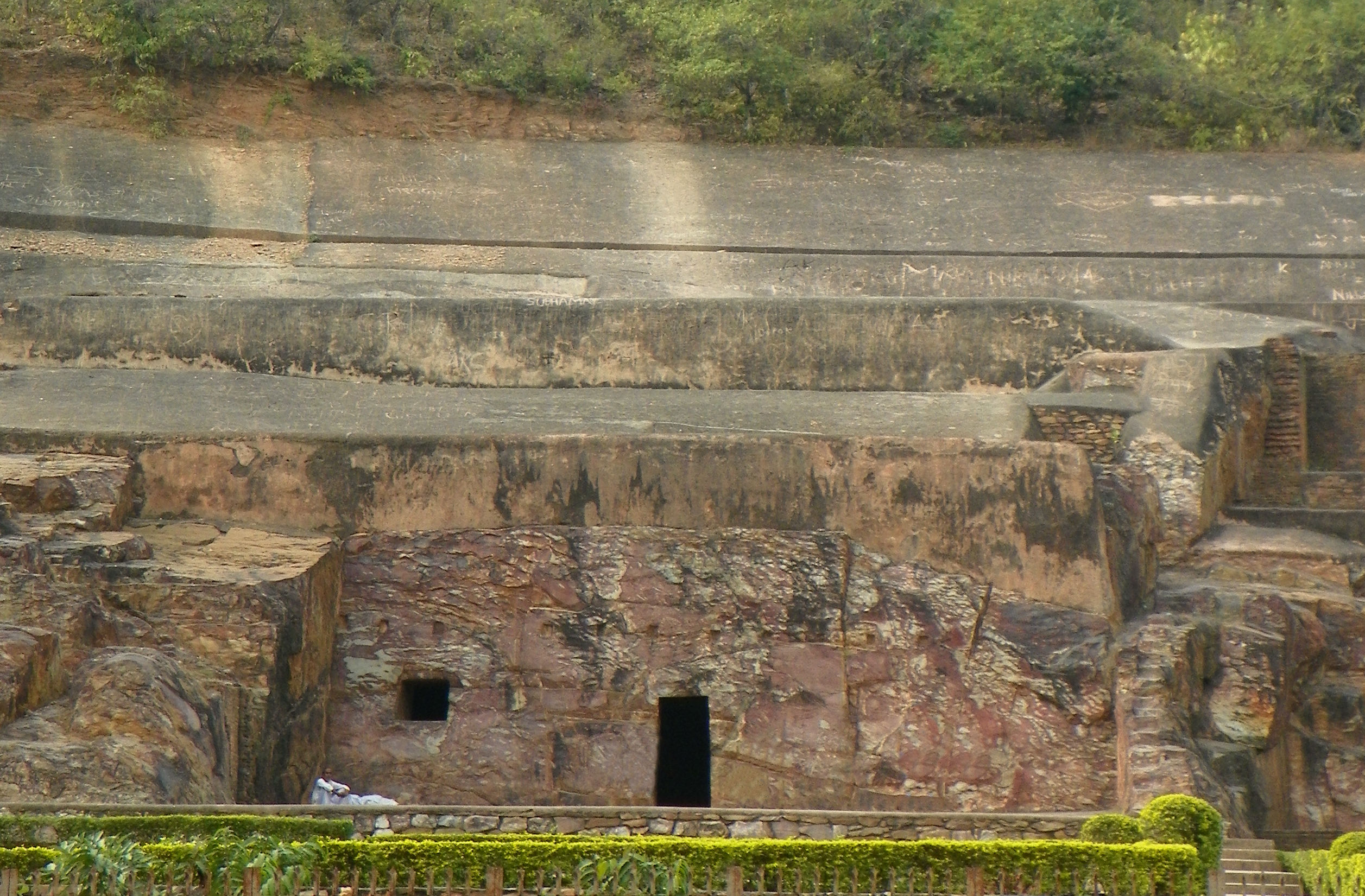
Outside of the cave.

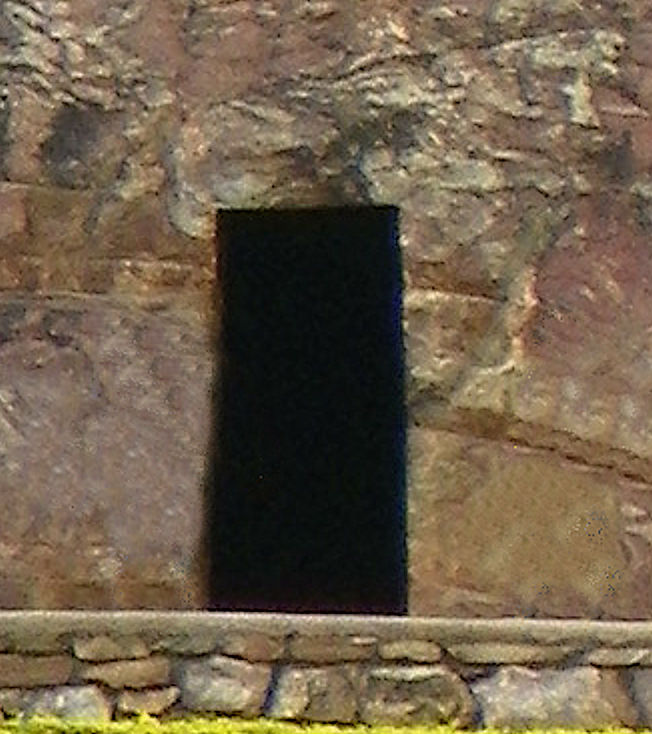
Trapezoidal Entrance

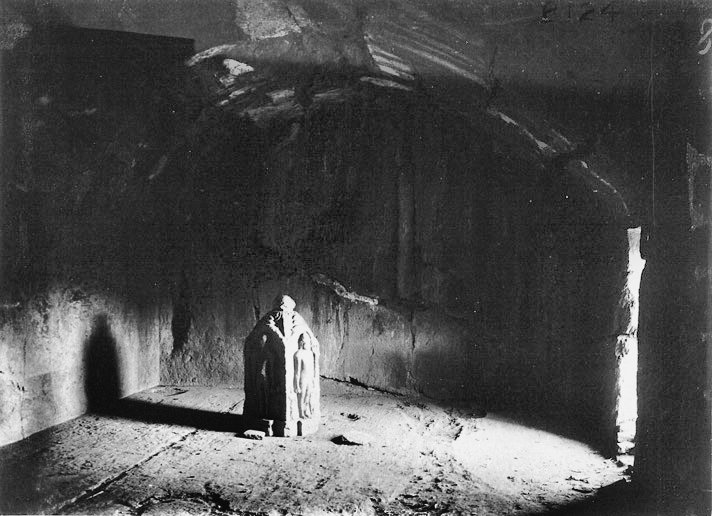
Inside the cave, with votive Jain stele.

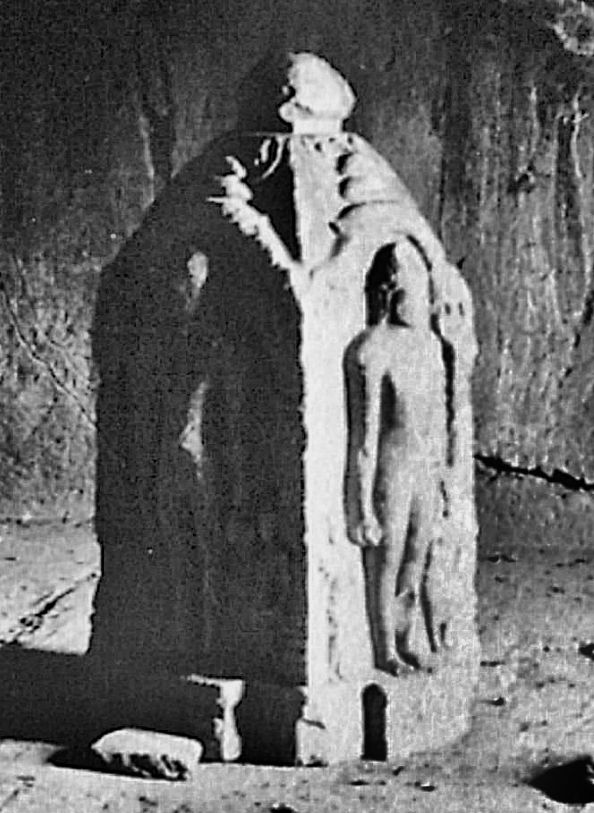
The Jain stele.

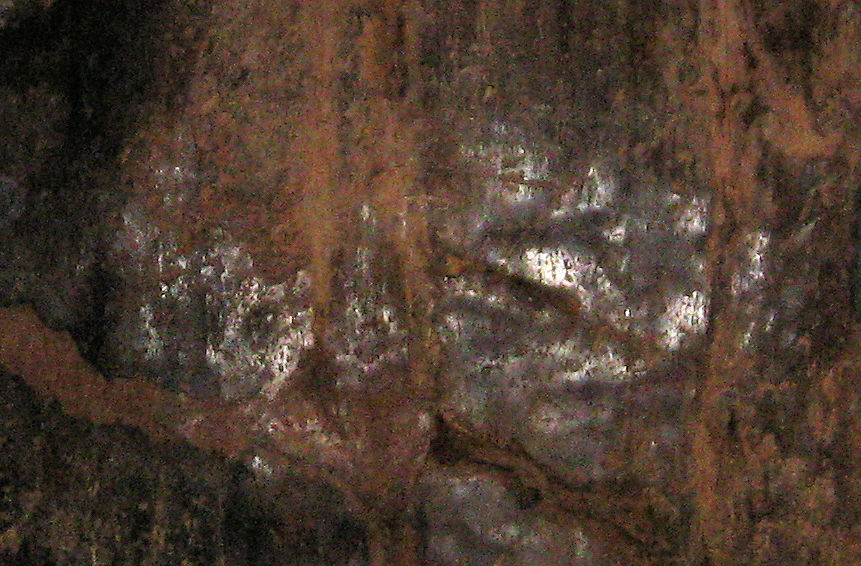
Partially polished surface .

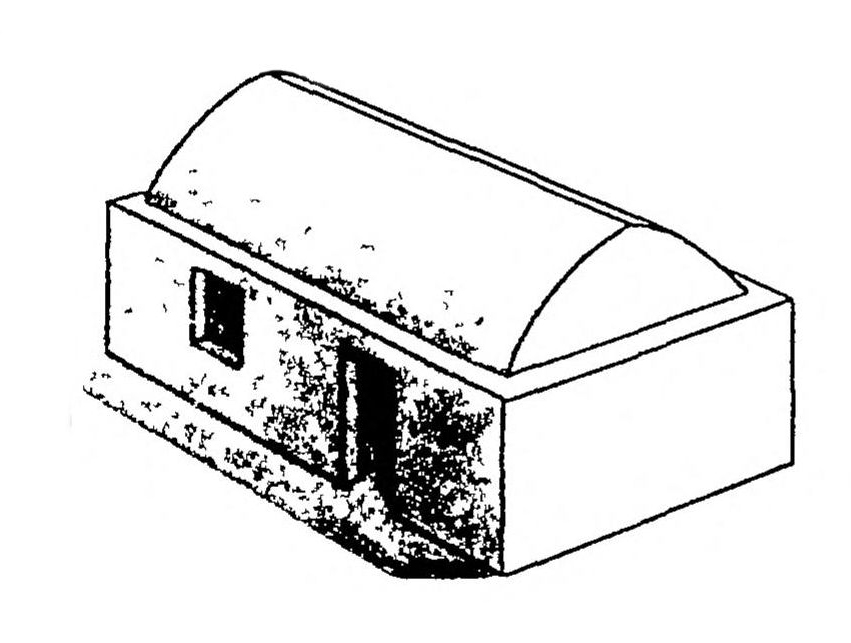
Volume map of the main cave.

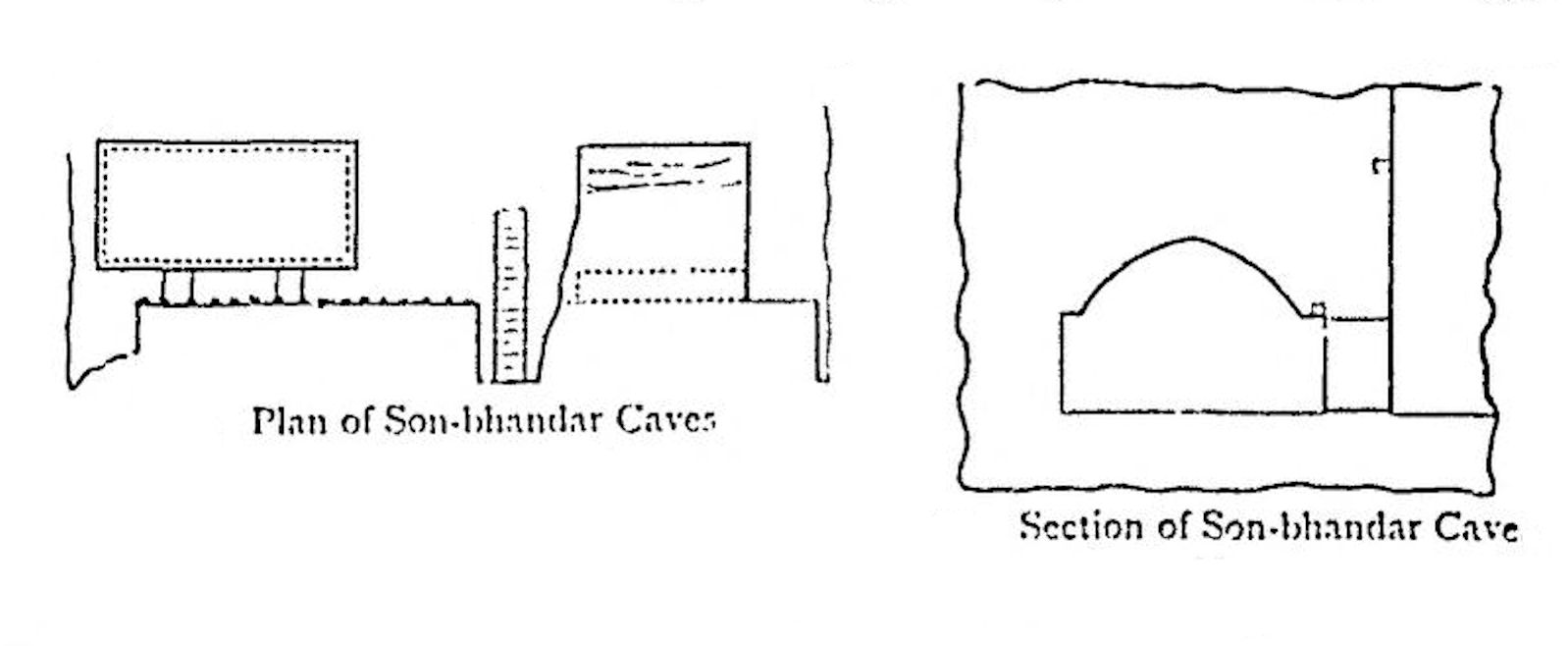
Plan the main cave and the second small cave next to it.

== Second cave ==
The second cave, adjacent to the main cave, is largely destroyed, but it has some beautiful Jain reliefs. This cave dates back to the 3rd and 4th century CE. The relief sculpture includes a carving of Mahavira on the cave wall.

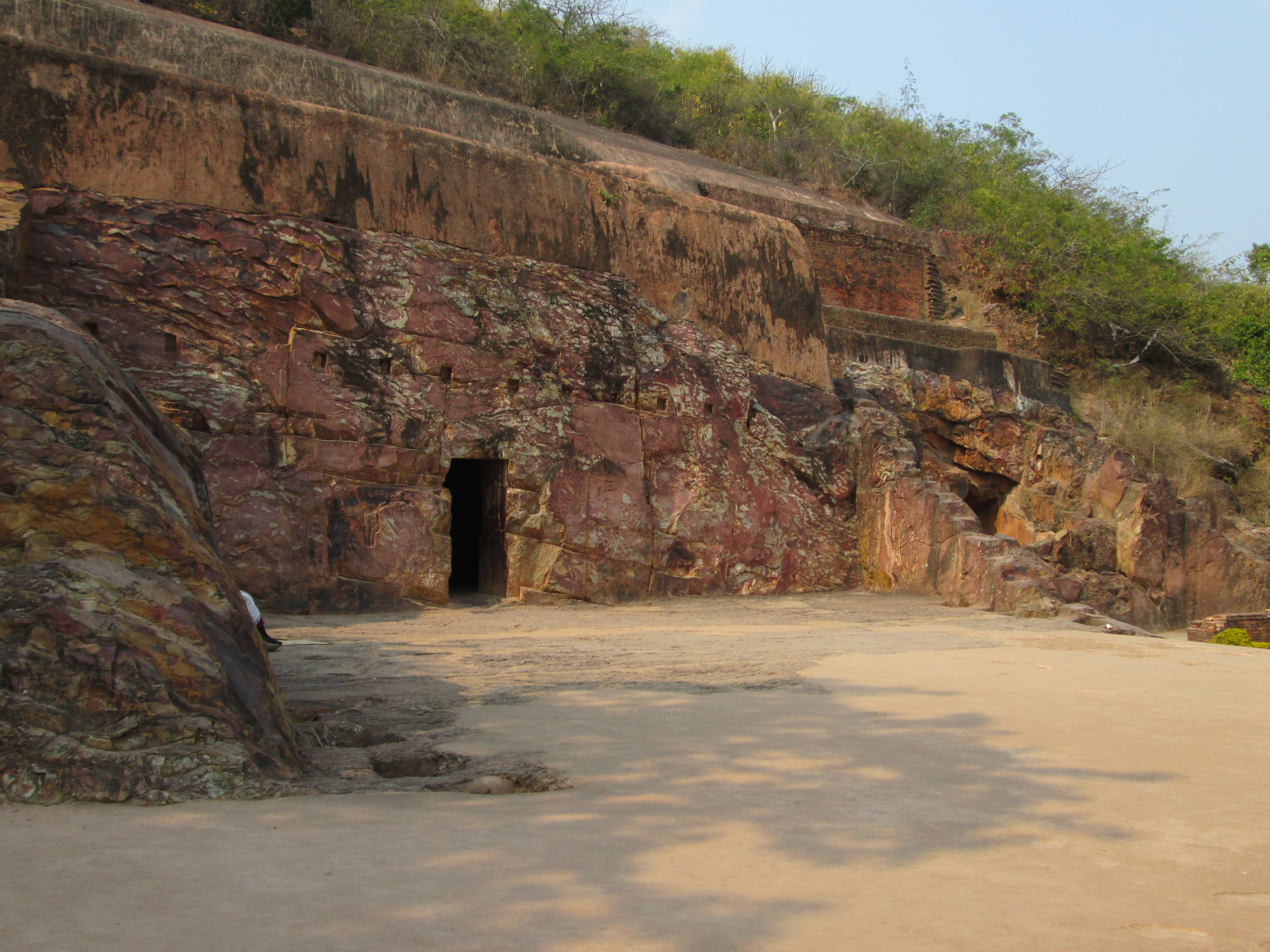
Main cave and second cave in the background.

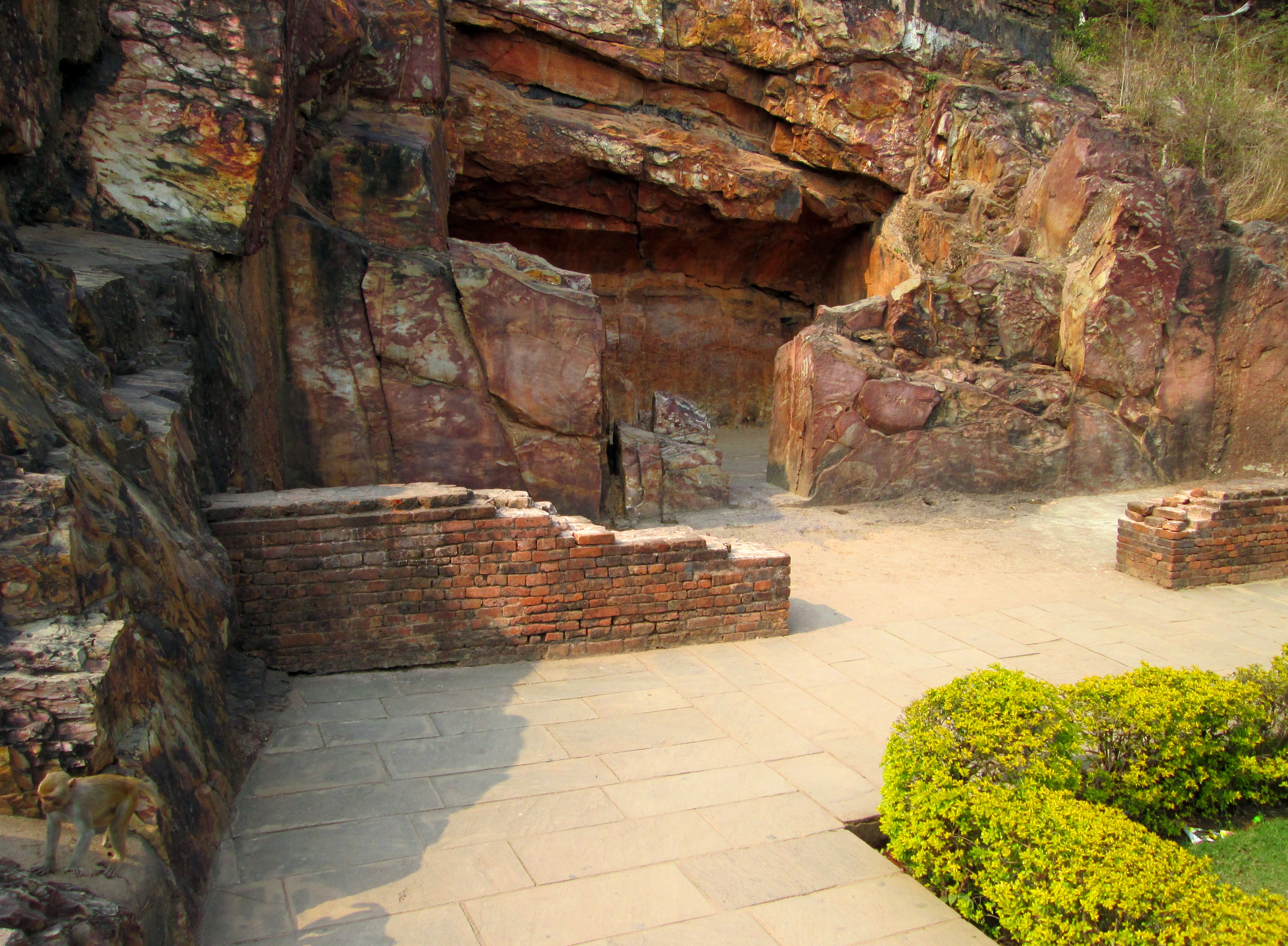
Facade of the second cave.

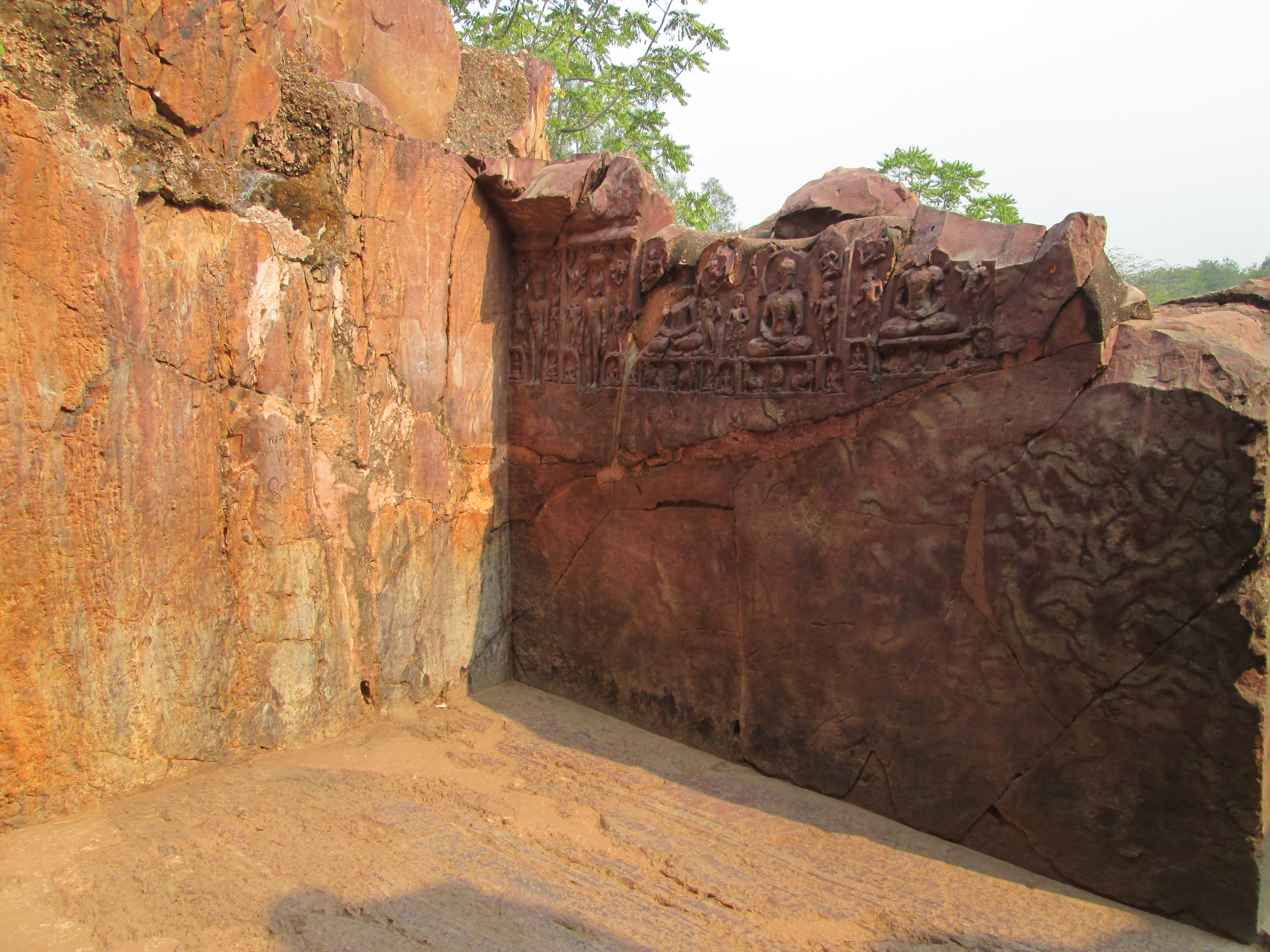
Inside wall of the second cave, with sculptures.

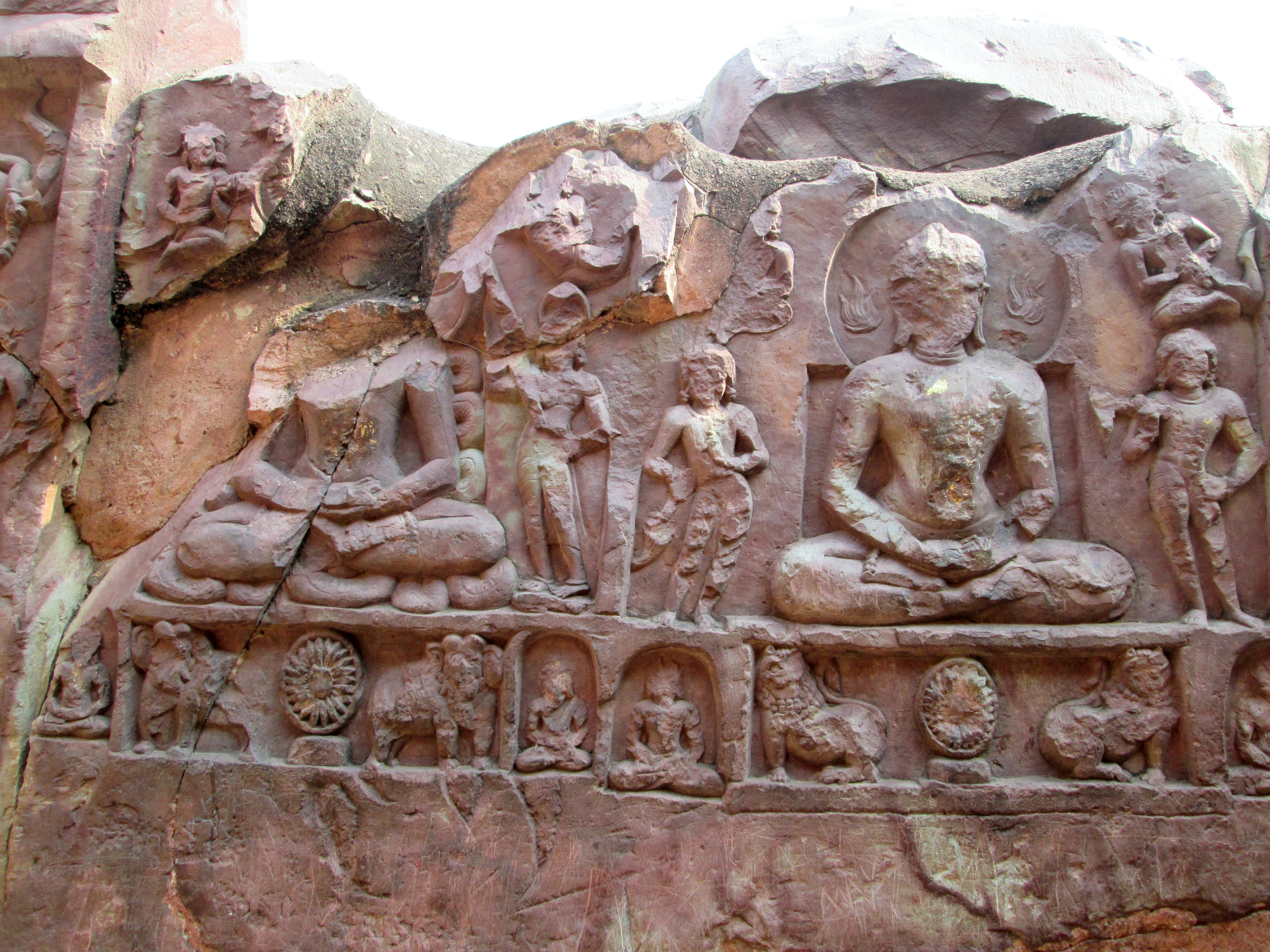
Jain sculptures of the second cave.

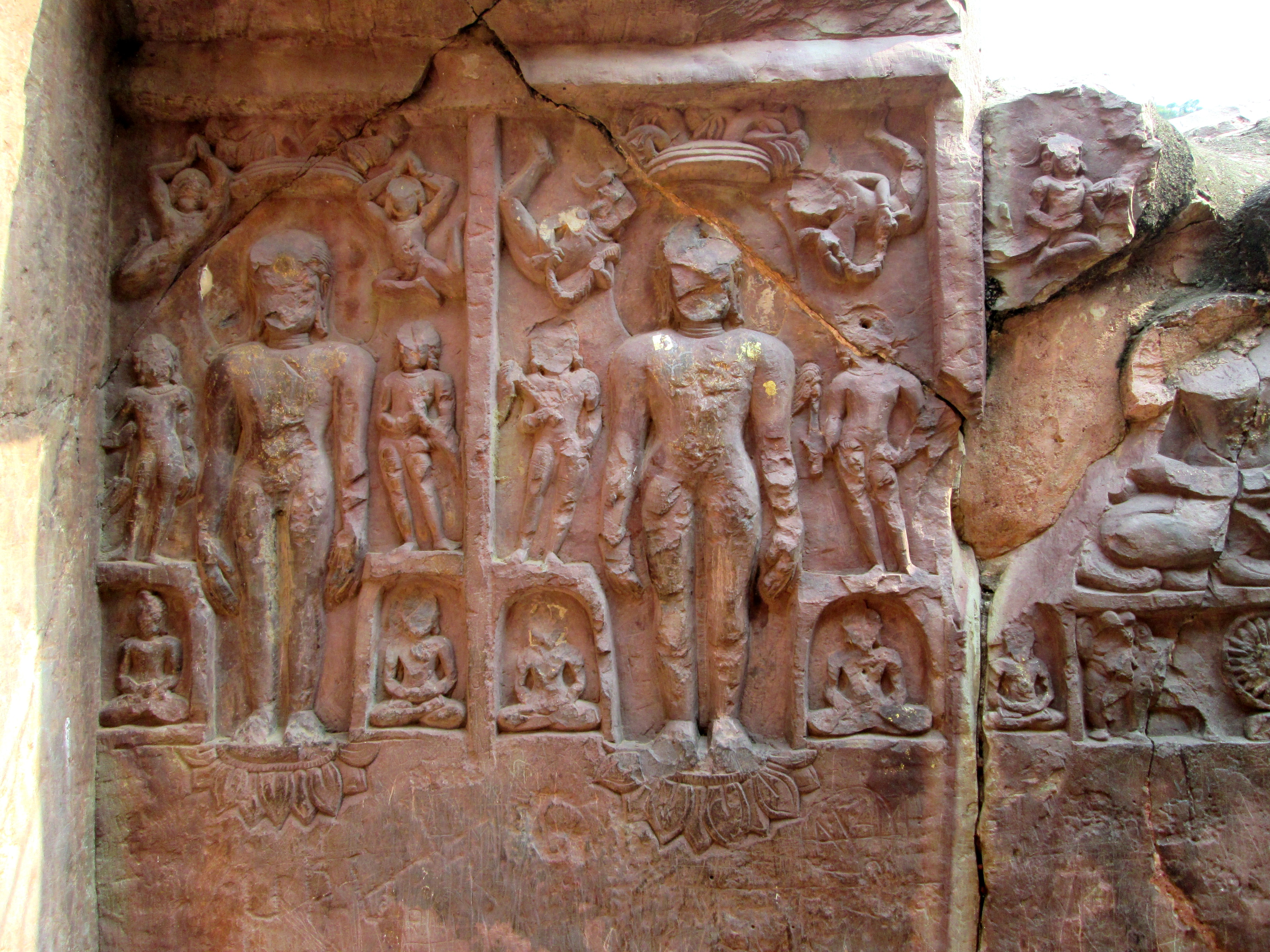
Jain sculptures of the second cave.

== See also ==
- Udayagiri and Khandagiri Caves
- Jain temples, Rajgir
