= Jain temple, Kundalpur (Bihar) =

Jain temple in the state of Bihar

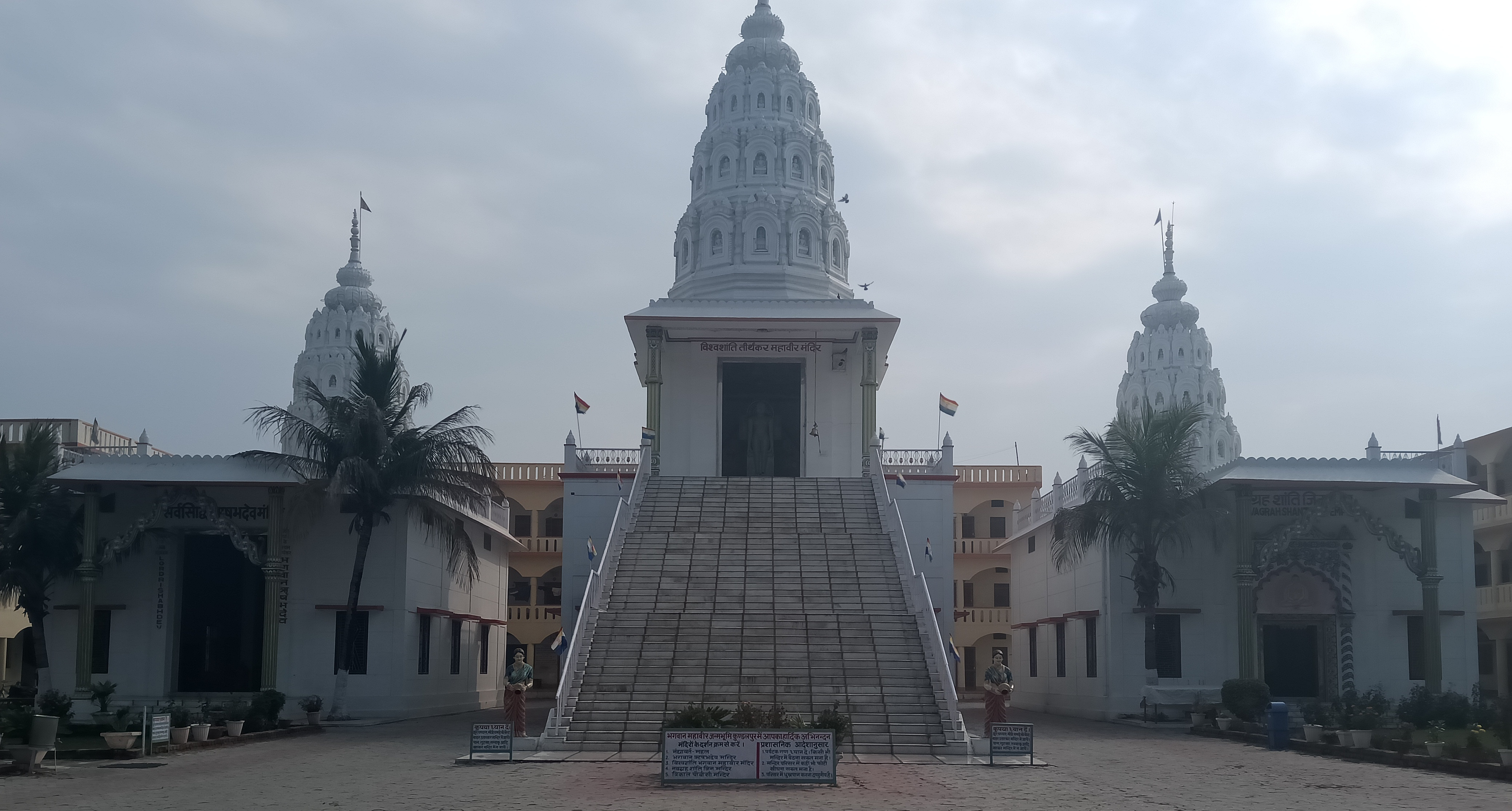
- Kundalpur Jain temple

Religion
- Affiliation: Jainism
- Deity: Mahavira
- Festival: Mahavir Janma Kalyanak
- Governing body: Bhagwan Mahavira Janmabhoomi Kundalpur Digambar Jain Samiti

Location
- Location: Kundalpur, Nalanda, Bihar
- Interactive map of Jain temple, Kundalpur
- Coordinates: 25°8′52.8″N 85°26′40.7″E

Architecture
- Creator: Gyanmati
- Established: 2003
- Temple: 6

Jain temple, Kundalpur is a complex of six Jain temples located in Kundalpur village near Nalanda, Bihar. Kundalpur is one of the most important Jain pilgrimages in Bihar. The temple complex is located approximately 1.6 km (0.99 mi) from the ruins of Nalanda mahavihara. According to the Digambara tradition, Kundalpur is regarded as the birthplace of Mahavira, the 24th and last Tirthankara.

== History ==
Kundalpur was an ancient capital city ruled by the Licchavi. Kundalpur is believed to be the birthplace of Mahavira, the 24th tirthankara of Jainism. The identification of Kundalpur near Nalanda as Mahavira's birthplace is specific to Digambara tradition. Other Jain traditions and modern scholarship have identified Basukund near Vaishali with the ancient Kundagrama associated with Mahavira's birth.

This place is also believed to birthplace of four of the eleven Ganadhara of Mahavira, including Gautama Swami. Kundalpur contains both an older Jain temple and a modern temple complex. The Government of Bihar records that the present principal temple is of recent construction, while an ancient Jain temple also survives at the site.

== Architecture ==
The ancient Jain temple called Simhamukhi Teela is located near Nalanda and houses a 4.5 feet (1.4 m) idol of Mahavira. The temple houses a number of Jain artifacts. The new temple complex, located 1 kilometre (0.62 mi) from the ancient temple, consists of five temples. The temple is constructed using stones from Jaisalmer housing idols of Mahavira, Rishabhanatha and Gautama Swami. The principal modern temple has a shikhara approximately 51 ft (16 m) high, surmounted by a golden flag.

In Kundalpur temple complex, a total of 72 idols of Tirthankaras for each of the past, present and future cycles installed in a separate temples.

The temple also has a dharamshala equipped with all modern facilities, including Bhojanalaya (a restaurant). Kundalpur is one of the most important Jain pilgrimage centres of Bihar and proposed to be developed as part of the Jain circuit.

== Temples ==
The modern complex with five temples is located near an older Jain temple. The temples contain images of Mahavira, Rishabhanatha and Gautama Swami. The use of yellow stone brought from Jaisalmer gives the modern temple complex an architectural appearance distinct from the older Jain remains of the Nalanda region.

=== Temple of Mahavira ===
The principal shrine is dedicated to Mahavira. The modern temple's shikhara rises approximately 51 feet and is crowned by a golden flag.

=== Rishabhanatha and Gautama Swami ===
Other shrines in the complex house images of Rishabhanatha, the first Tirthankara, and Gautama Swami, the chief ganadhara of Mahavira.

=== Seventy-two Jinas ===
A separate structure in the complex contains 72 images of the Jinas for worship. The arrangement represents sets of the twenty-four Tirthankaras belonging to the past, present and future cycles of time in Jain cosmology.

== Surroundings ==
Two historic water bodies, known as the Dirgha Pushkarni and Pandava Pushkarni, are located near the temple. Kundalpur lies close to the archaeological remains of ancient Nalanda and forms part of Bihar's Jain pilgrimage circuit together with sites including Rajgir, Pawapuri and Vaishali.

== Religious significance ==
Kundalpur is an important Jain pilgrimage centre in Bihar and has been proposed for development as part of the state's Jain circuit. For Digambara Jains, the religious importance of Kundalpur derives principally from the tradition identifying it as the birthplace of Mahavira. The site is also traditionally associated with Mahavira's ganadharas, particularly Gautama Swami, whose image is enshrined in the modern temple complex.

== Gallery ==
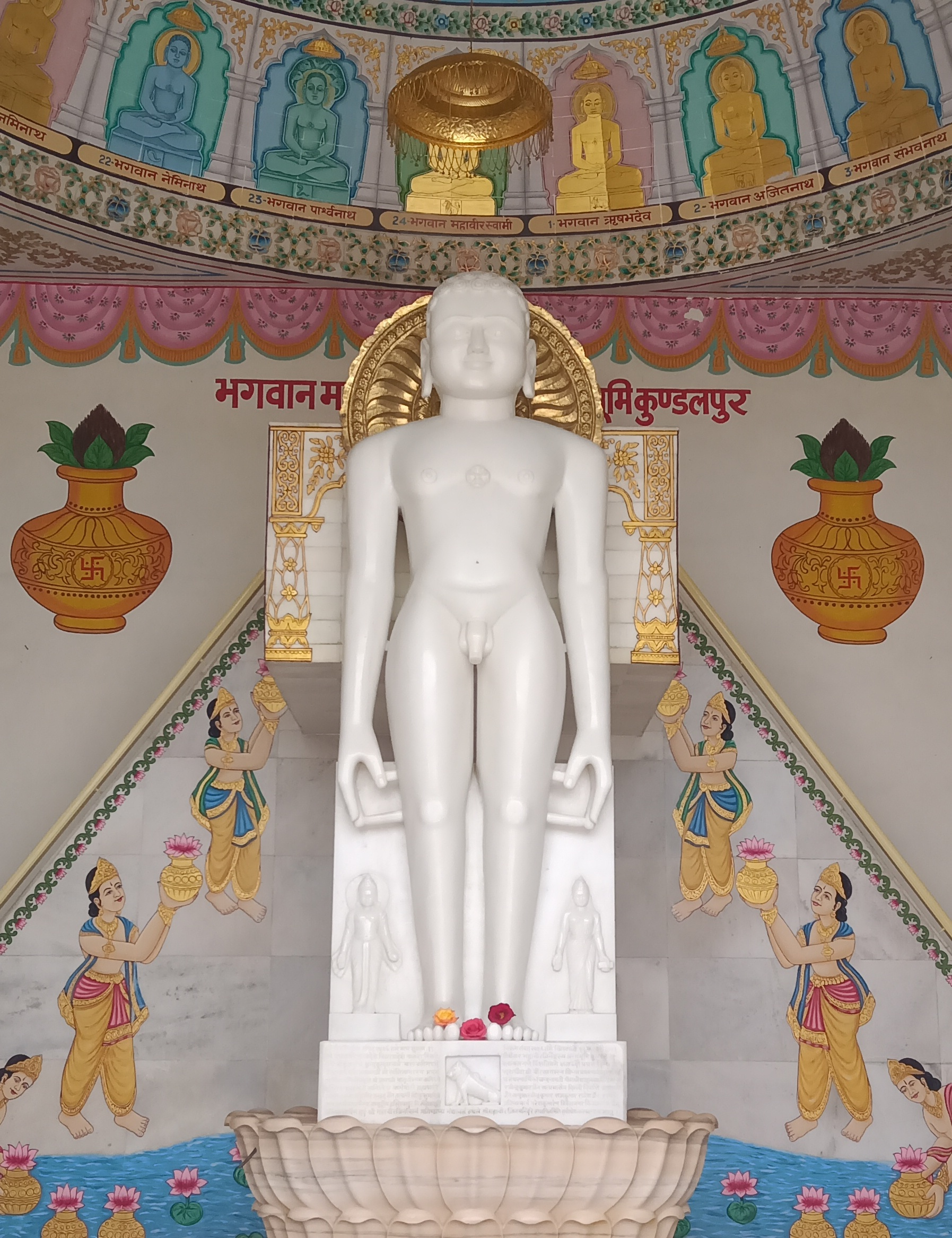
3.4 metres (11 ft) idol of Mahavira

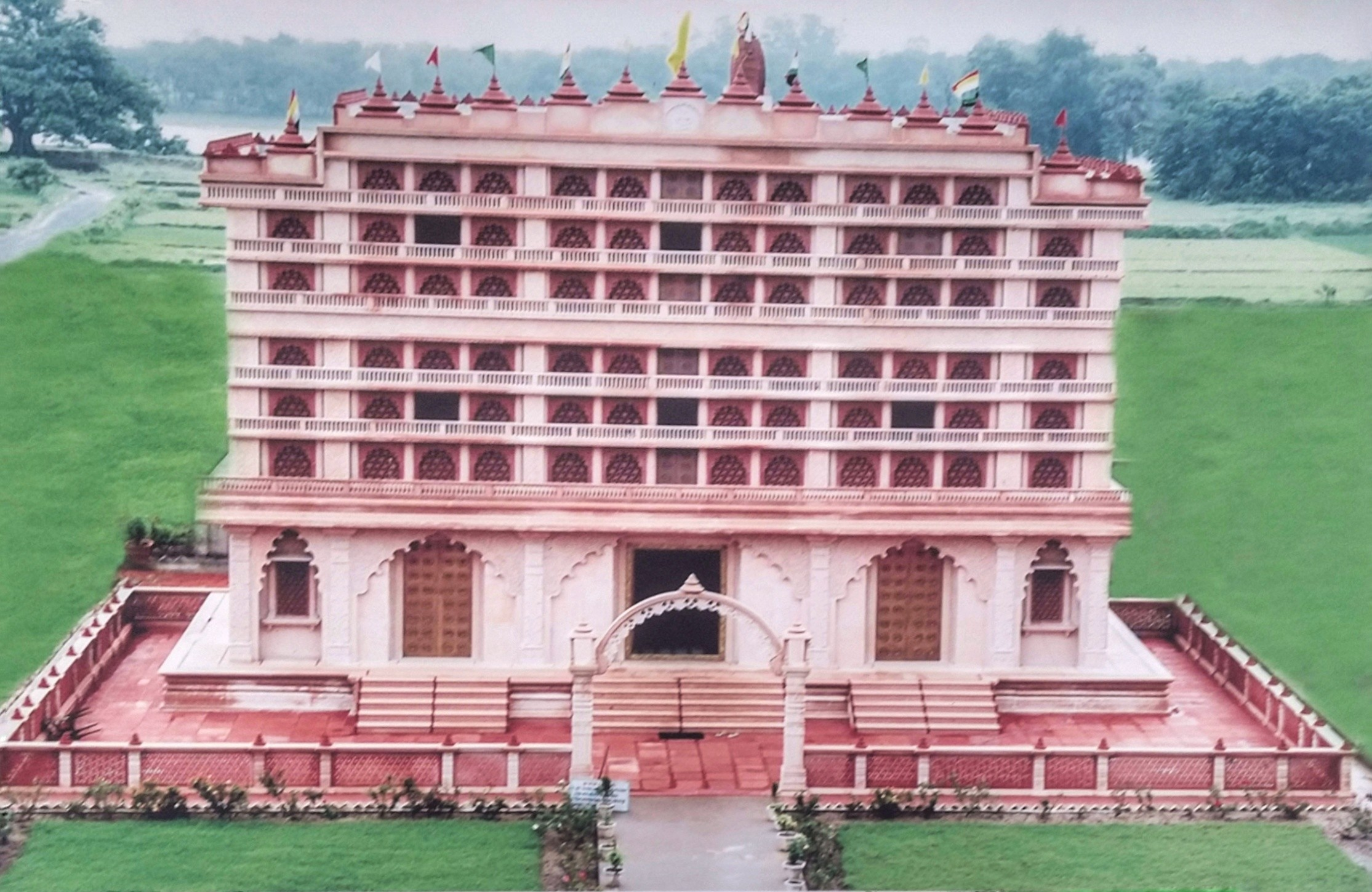
Mural of Nandyavrat Mahal temple

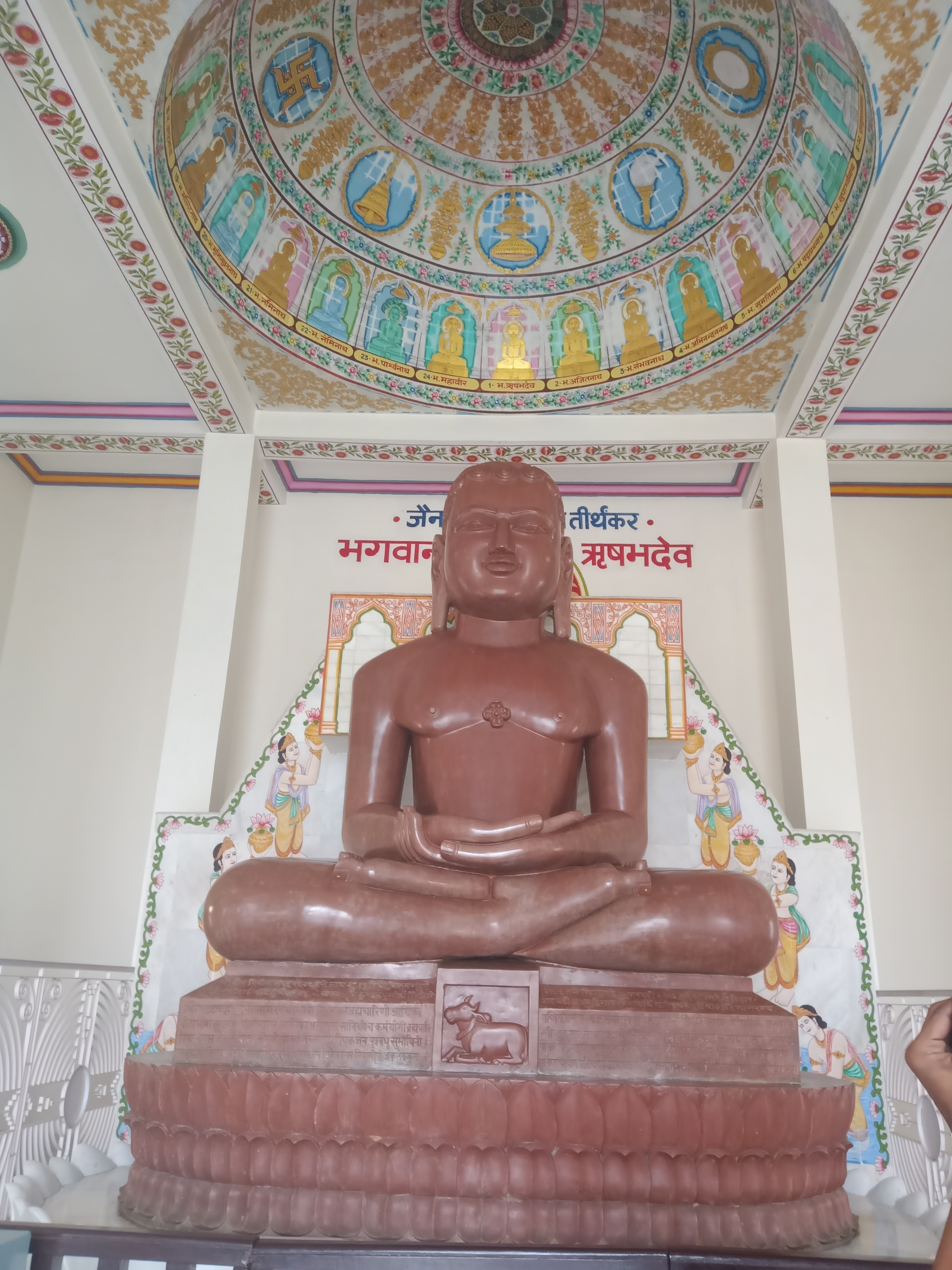
Rishabhanatha idol inside Rishabhanatha temple

== Festival ==
Kundalpur Mahotsav is the main festival celebrated in here, the event is organised on the day of Mahavir Janma Kalyanak.

== See also ==
- Pawapuri
- Jain temples, Rajgir
