= Lachhuar Jain temple =

Jain temple in the state of Bihar

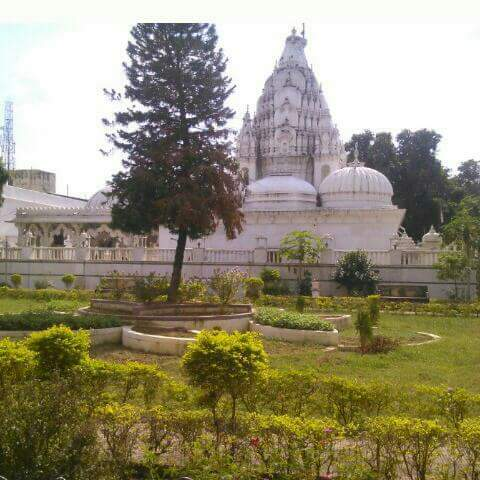
- Lachhuar Jain temple

Religion
- Affiliation: Jainism
- Sect: Śvētāmbara
- Deity: Mahavira
- Festival: Mahavir Janma Kalyanak
- Governing body: Anandji Kalyanji Trust

Location
- Location: Lachhuar village, Jamui, Bihar
- Interactive map of Lachhuar Jain temple
- Coordinates: 24°54′52.34″N 86°0′52″E

Architecture
- Creator: Raja Dhanpat Singh Bahadur
- Established: 1857
- Temple: 2

Lachhuar Jain temple is a Jain temples located in Lachhuar village near Jamui, Bihar. Lachhuar is one of the most important Jain pilgrimages in Bihar.

== Description ==
This temple is part of Jain circuit of Bihar and is a popular Jain pilgrimage. This temple also temporarily housed the ancient 2,600 years idol of Mahavira from temple in The temple also has a dharamshala equipped with all modern facilities and bhojnalaya.

== History ==
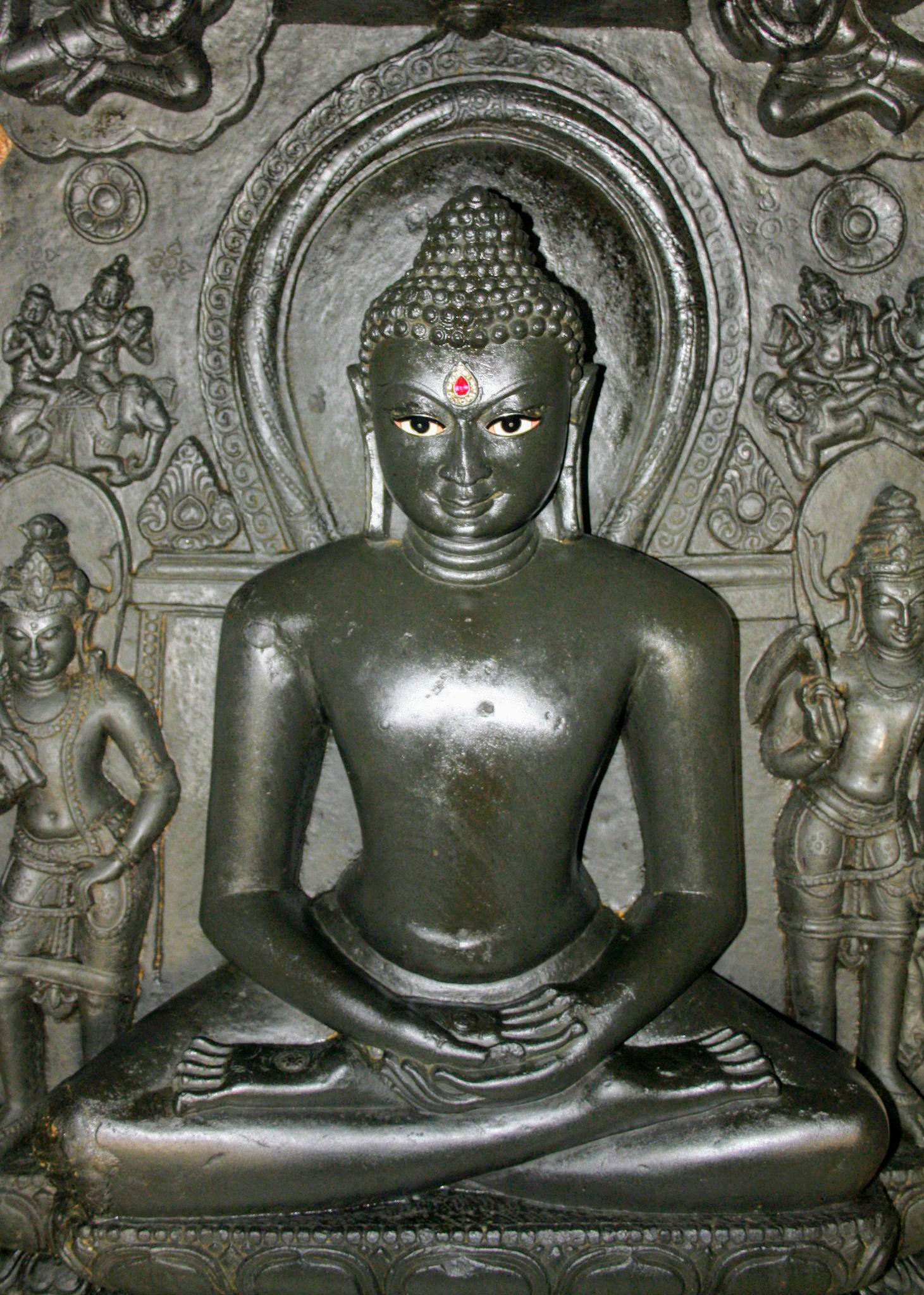
Murti of Mahavira at his birthplace, Kshatriyakund (Shvetambara tradition), in Bihar

According to Śvētāmbara tradition, Lachhuar a doorway to Kshatriyakund which is believed to be the birthplace of Mahavira. To commemorate his birthplace a large temple along with a dharamshala was constructed by Raja Dhanpat Singh Bahadur in 1857.

== See also ==
- Jain temples, Rajgir
