= Jain temples, Rajgir =

Group of Jain temples in Bihar, India

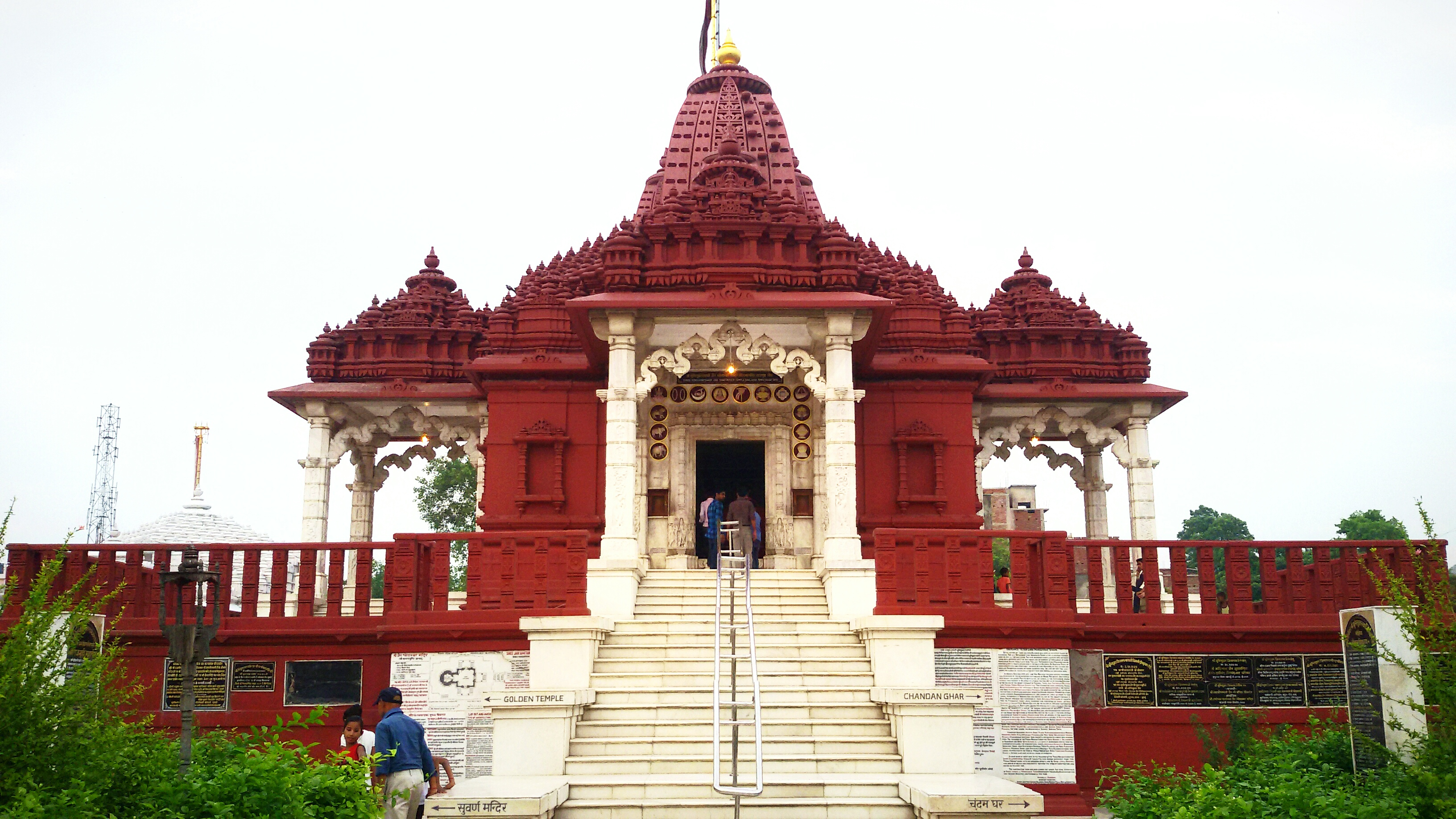
- Naulakha Mandir

Religion
- Affiliation: Jainism
- Sect: Śvētāmbara and Digambara
- Deity: Tirthankaras

Location
- Location: Rajgir, Nalanda

Architecture
- Temple: 26

The Jain temples of Rajgir are a group of Jain temples and ancient Jain archaeological remains at Rajgir in Nalanda district, Bihar, India. Rajgir, ancient Rajagriha, was an important Jain centre and continues to be regarded as a sacred place by Jains. Rajgir is closely associated in Jain tradition with Mahavira and Munisuvrata. The archaeological remains associated with Jainism at Rajgir include the Son Bhandar Caves, remains of an ancient Jain temple on Vaibhara Hill, Jain sculptures and inscriptions.

== History ==
Rajgir was anciently known as Rajagriha or Girivraja and served as the capital of Magadha. During the reigns of Bimbisara and Ajatashatru, Rajgir developed into an important political and religious centre for Jainism and Buddhism. Mahavira spent fourteen years of his life at Rajgir and Nalanda including Chaturmas.

Rajgir has ruins including Jain temple, sculptures and inscriptions.

== Jain temples on the hills ==
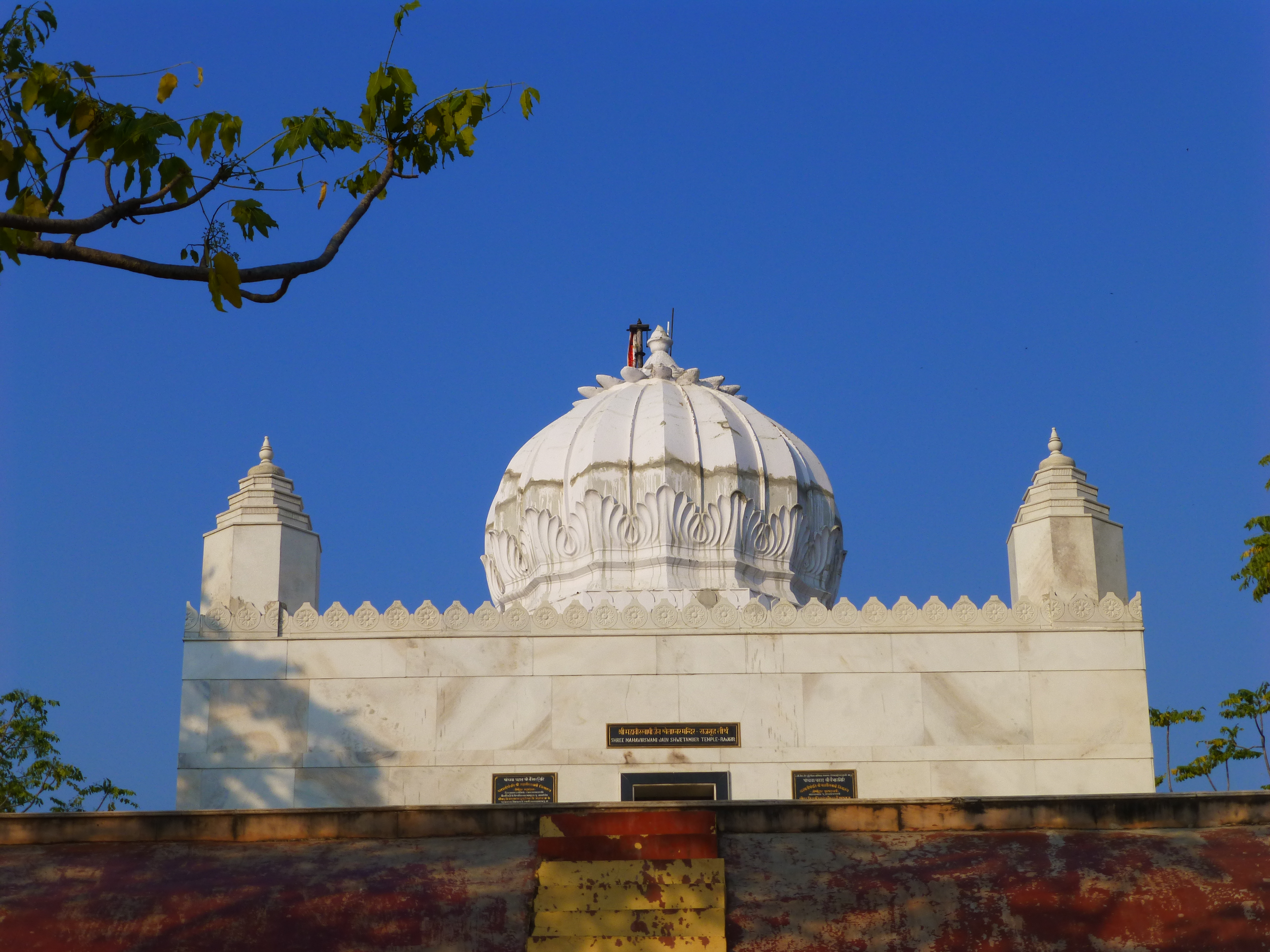
Mahavir Shwetamber Temple

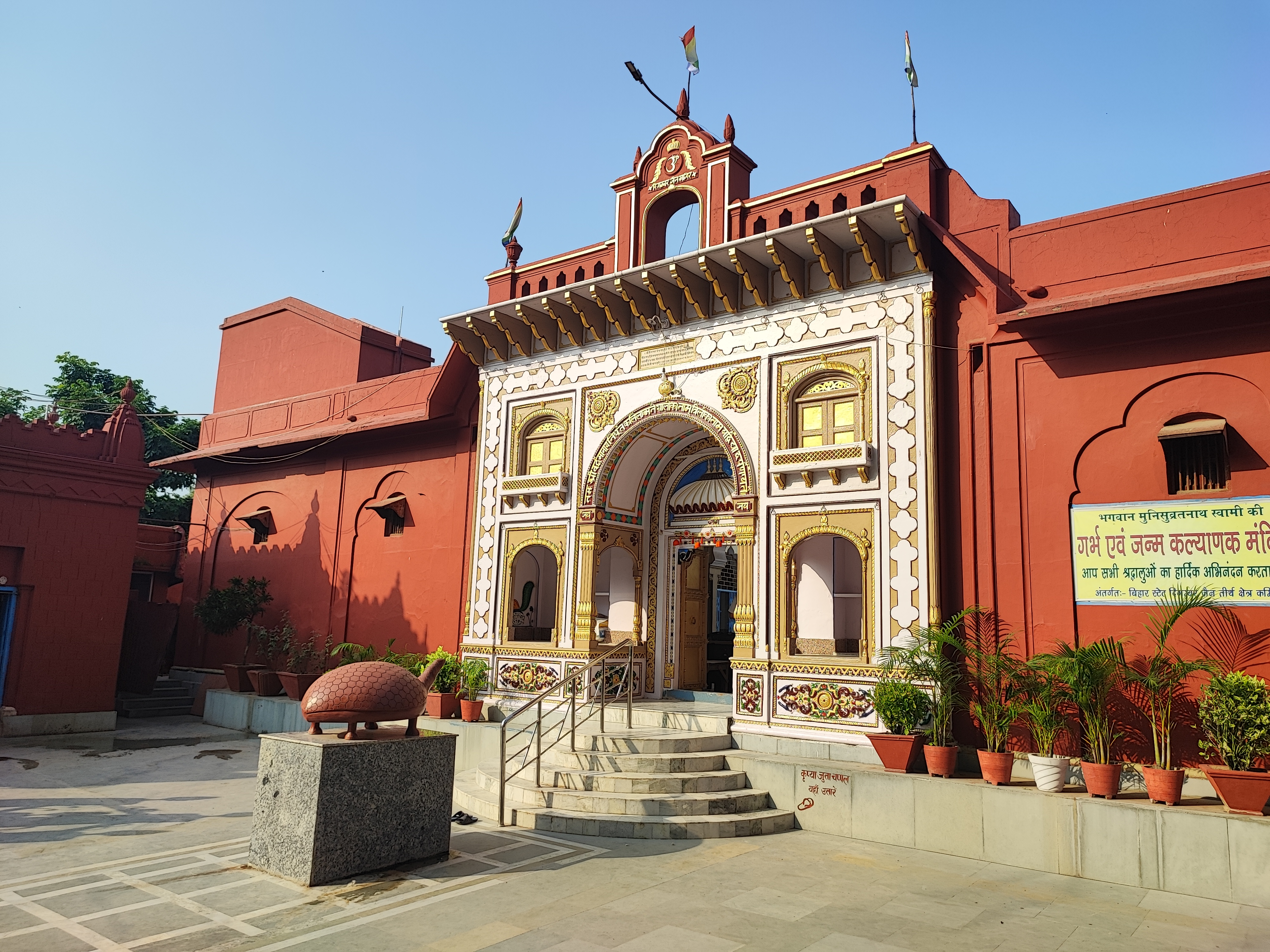
Munisuvrat Digambar temple

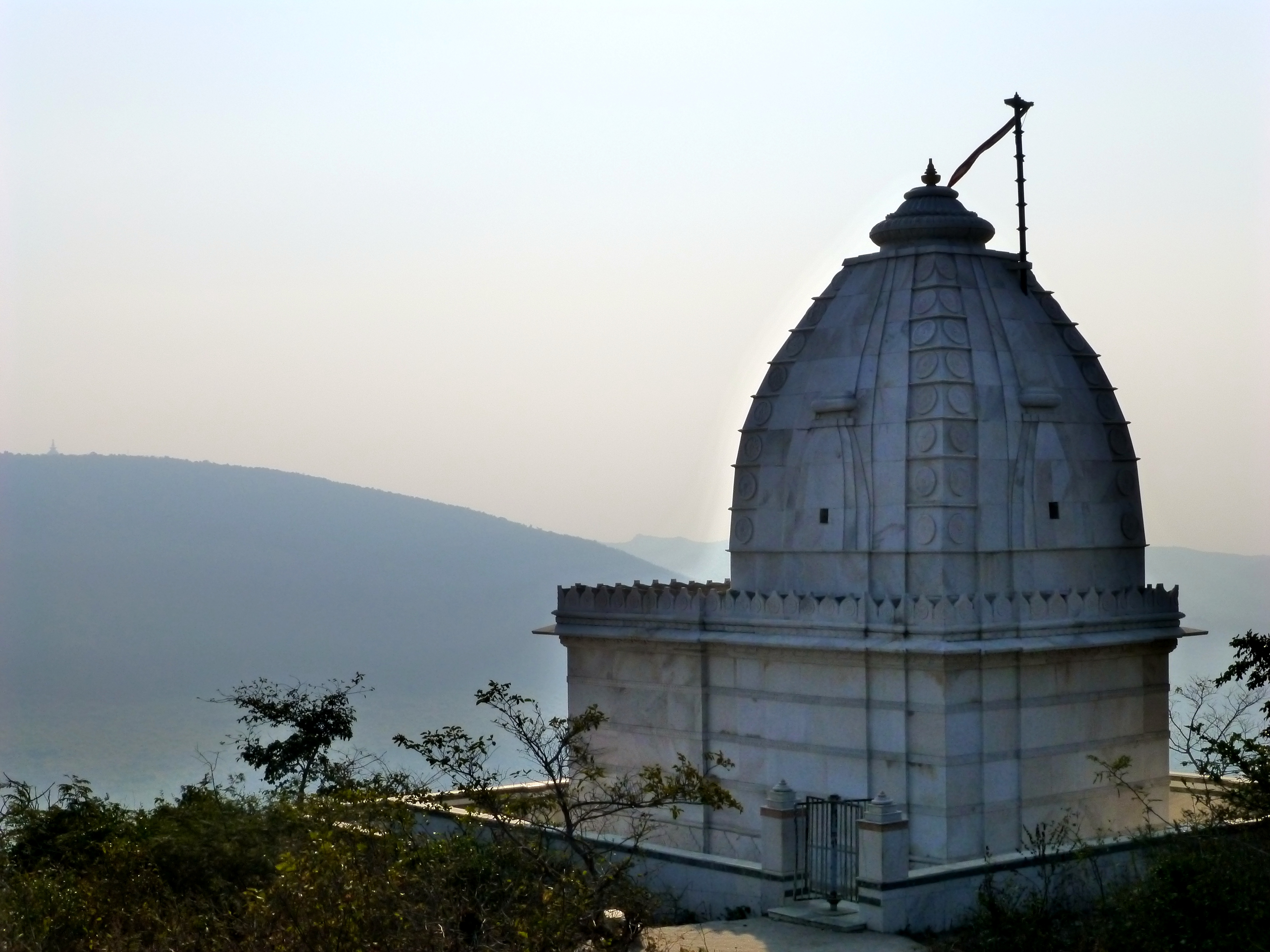
Dhannasheth-Shalibhadra temple

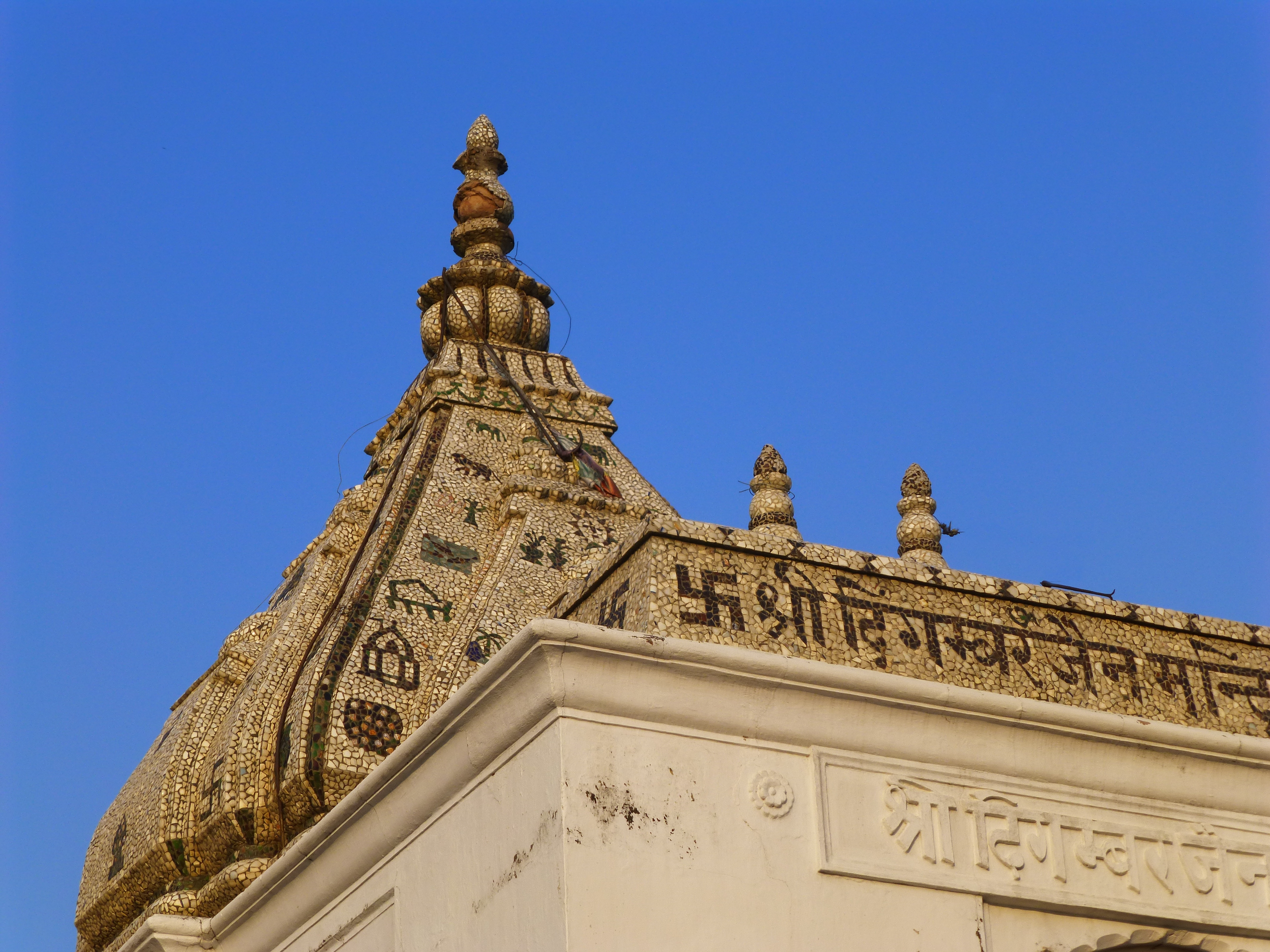
Digambar temple

Rajgir is surrounded by five hills — Vipula, Vaibhara, Ratna, Udaya and Sona. Rajgir has 26 Jain temples and shrines are situated on the summits and slopes of these hills.

=== Vaibhara Hill ===
Vaibhara Hill preserves important archaeological evidence of ancient Jain sites. The Jain sculptures and ruined temple dating back to early 12th century are protected by Archaeological Survey of India.

=== Vipula Hill ===
Vipula Hill is another important Jain pilgrimage site at Rajgir. Jain temples stand on its summit, including a modern Digambara temple. The hill is traditionally associated with events in the life of Mahavira.

== Naulakha Jain temple ==
The Naulakha Jain templeor Gaon Mandir, is a Śvētāmbara Jain temple situated at the foothills of Rajgir. The temple feature a black stone idol of Munisuvrata. An inscription on the image records its installation in 1447 CE by a lay devotee named Jinadasa. The sculpture is accompanied by attendant figures and has representations of lions at its base. This is an ancient temple that has undergone several renovations. An inscription records that the temple underwent renovation in 1641 CE, during the reign of Shah Jahan. The temple was subsequently renovated in 1763 by Manekchandbhai of Hooghly, in 1961 by Devasibhai of Jharia, and again in 2008. A 9.1-foot (2.8 m) image of Munisuvrata was installed in 1961.

The temple also preserves medieval Jain idols, including images of Rishabhanatha and Shantinatha dated to 1447 CE, which were brought from Suvarnagiri and Ratnagiri respectively. An image of Parshvanatha, from the 15th century, was brought from Udayagiri. The temple feature 87 feet (27 m) shikhara decorated with 85 kalashas.

== Son Bhandar Caves ==
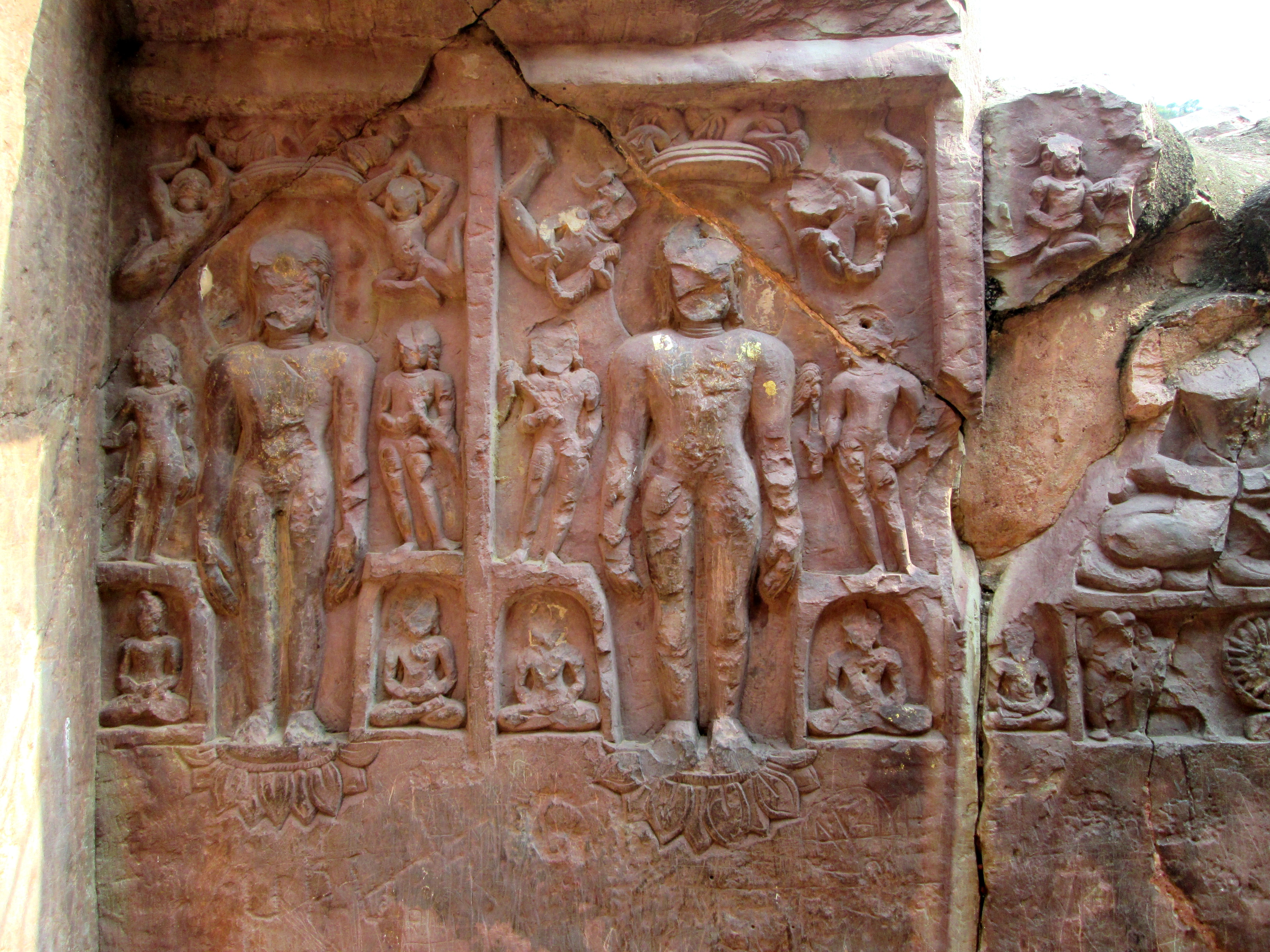
Jain sculptures in Son Bhandar Caves

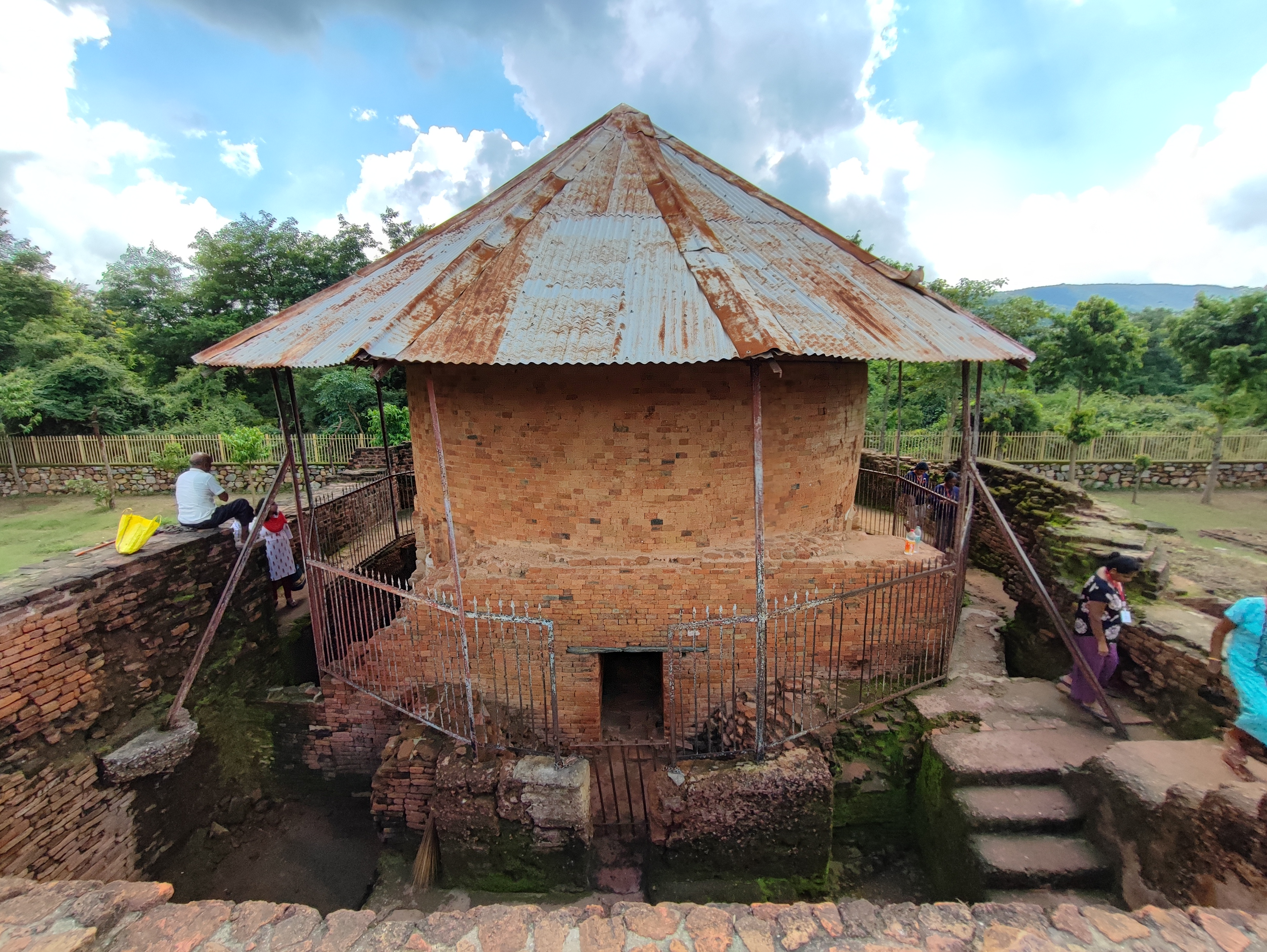
Maniyar Math

The Son Bhandar Caves are two rock-cut caves situated at the southern foot of Vaibhara Hill. They form one of the most important archaeological sites associated with Jainism at Rajgir. The western cave preserves an inscription indicating that the caves were associated with Jain ascetics. Jain images are carved on the walls of the eastern cave. The cave dates were constructed c. 319 — 180 BCE, during the Maurya Empire. Son Bhandar Caves was expanded to include second cave in 3rd and 4th century CE.

== Maniyar Math ==
Maniyar Math is an ancient archaeological monument situated within the valley of Rajgir. Excavations revealed evidence of successive religious activity associated with different traditions, including Jainism. The temple dates back to 6th century. Alexander Cunningham investigated the mound in the nineteenth century and identified a Jain temple at the site. Archaeological finds from Maniyar Math included sculptures and objects associated with serpent worship.

The surviving monument consists principally of a cylindrical structure surrounded by a platform. Archaeological evidence indicates that the site was used by several religious traditions over an extended period.

== Ancient Jain temple on Vaibhara Hill ==
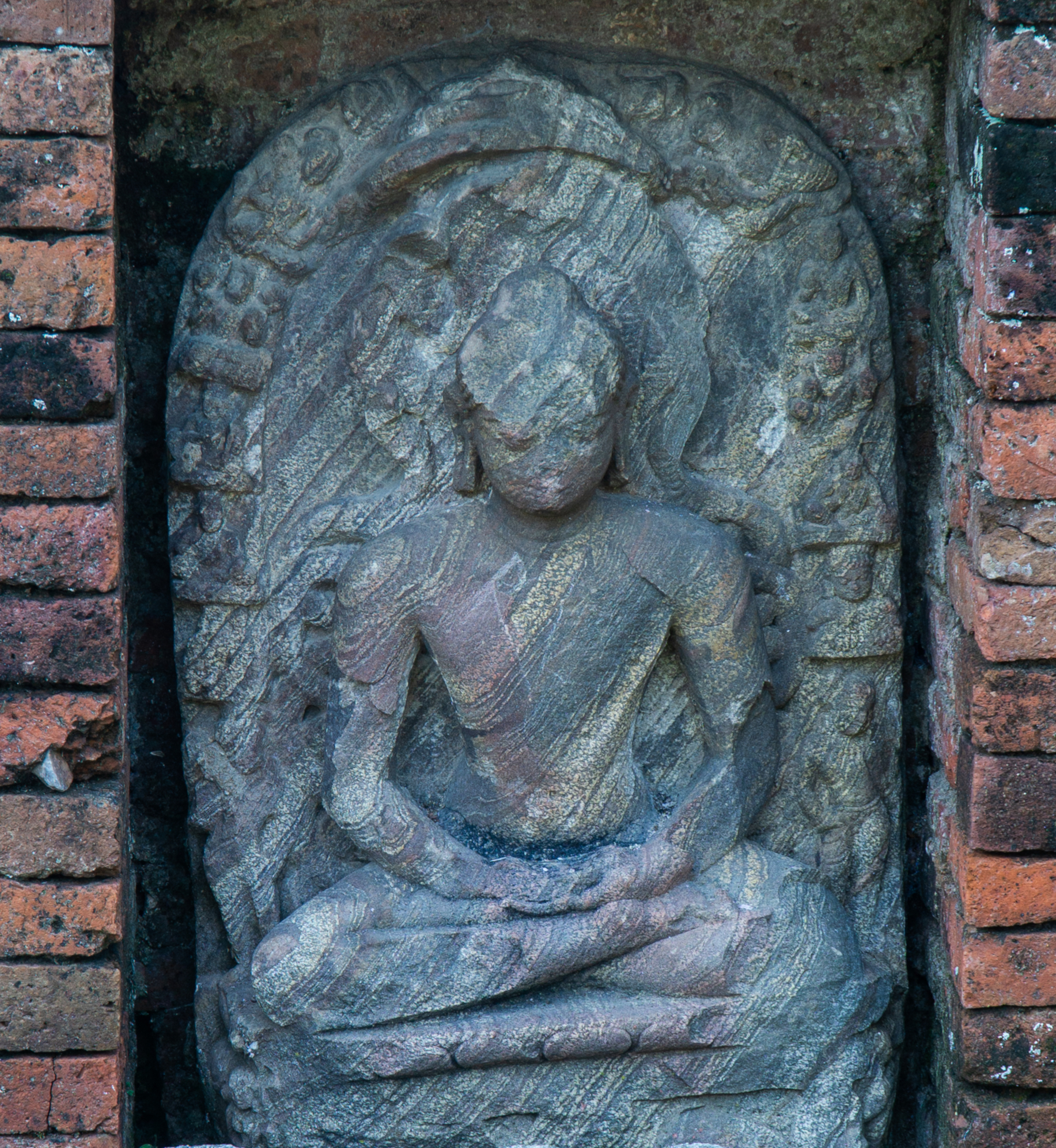
Jain Shrine Ruins

The remains of an ancient Jain temple survive on Vaibhara Hill. Archaeological investigations at the site revealed sculptures and other remains associated with Jain worship. The temple site contained images of the Tirthankaras. Some of the sculptural remains recovered there were subsequently protected in a small shelter maintained by the Archaeological Survey of India. The surviving archaeological material demonstrates that Jain religious architecture existed on the hills of Rajgir before the construction of the present temples.

== Samavasarana temple ==
A modern Samavasarana temple stands at Rajgir at a place traditionally associated with the preaching of Mahavira. According to Bihar Tourism, a modern temple was constructed at the site in 1956. Jain tradition identifies the location as a place where Mahavira delivered sermons, including his final sermon.

The site also contains archaeological remains of an earlier stupa.

== Archaeological significance ==
The Jain remains of Rajgir form part of the extensive archaeological landscape of ancient Rajagriha. The Archaeological Survey of India protects the ancient structures, monuments and archaeological remains situated within the walls of old and new Rajagriha and in the surrounding area. The Jain archaeological evidence includes rock-cut caves, ruined shrines, inscriptions and sculptures of Tirthankaras. These remains demonstrate the importance of Rajgir as a Jain religious centre over an extended period.

The modern Jain temples on the surrounding hills continue the religious importance of these locations as pilgrimage sites.

== See also ==
- Jal Mandir, Pawapuri
- Jain temple, Kundalpur
- Lachhuar Jain temple
