= Kundalpur, Bihar =

Village in Bihar, India

Kundalpur
- Village
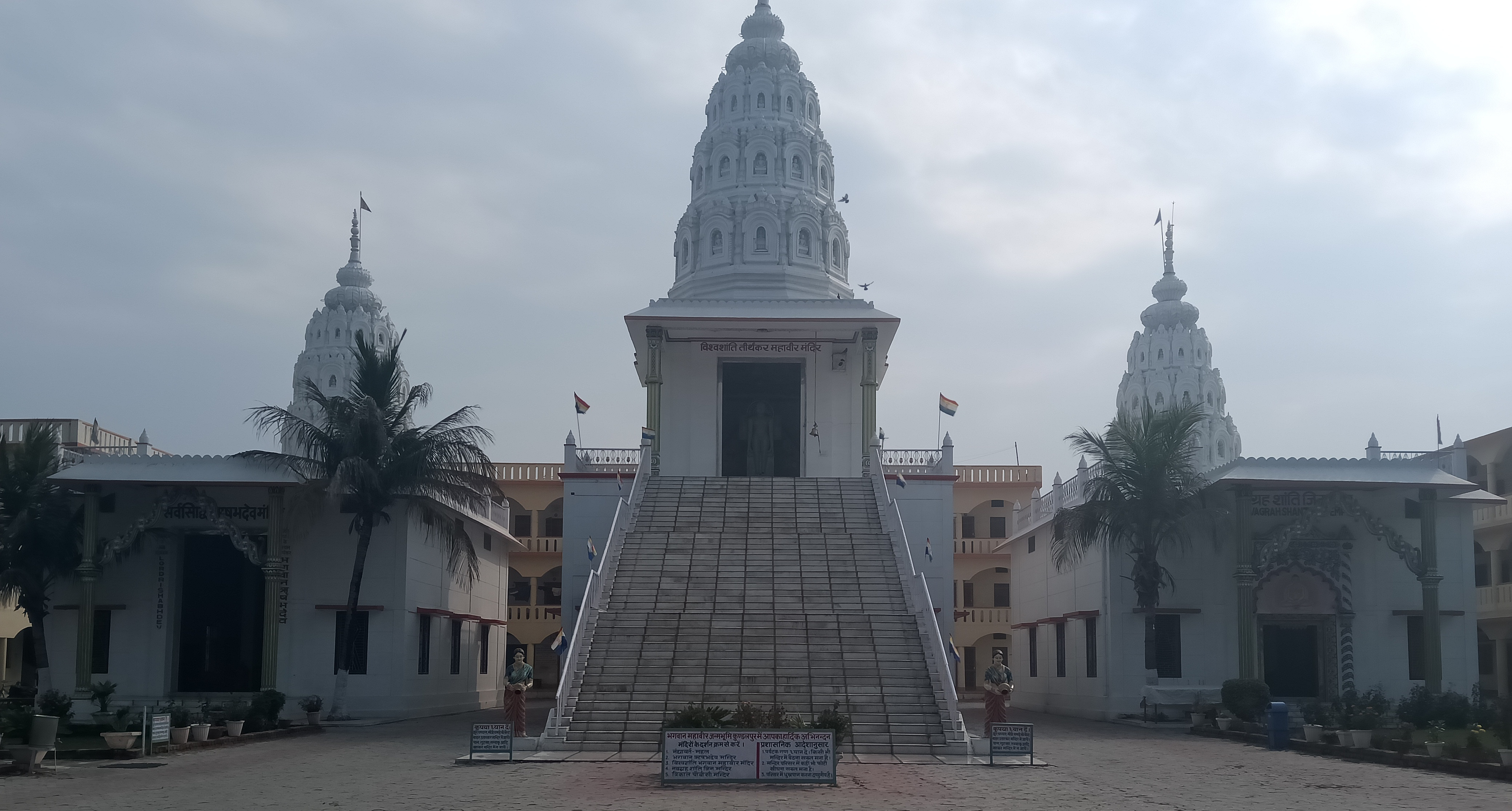
- Kundalpur Jain temple

- Location within Bihar
- Coordinates: 25.1473°N 85.4480°E
- Country: India
- State: Bihar
- District: Nalanda district

Languages
  - Official: Hindi
- Time zone: UTC+5:30 (IST)
- ISO 3166 code: IN-BR

Kundalpur is a village in Nalanda district in the Indian state of Bihar. It is located about 2.5 kilometres (1.6 miles) from ancient Nalanda Mahavihara, 11 kilometres (6.8 miles) southwest of Bihar Sharif, and 80 kilometres (50 miles) southeast of Patna.

According to the Digambara school of Jainism, Kundalpur is the birthplace of Lord Mahavira, the 24th and last tirthankara. There are temples dedicated to Mahavira, Rishabhanatha, and Gautama Swami located here.

== Demographics ==
According to the 2011 Census of India, Kundalpur had a population of 1,640 in 321 households. Males constituted 52.31% of the population and females 47.68%. Kundalpur has an average literacy rate of 42.56%, which is lower than the national average of 74%. Male literacy is 62.46%, and female literacy is 37.53%. In Kundalpur, 18.59% of the population is under 6 years of age.

== Birthplace of Mahavira ==
The birthplace of Mahavira (the 24th tirthankara of Jainism) remains a subject of dispute. According to the Uttarapurana — a Digambara text — Mahavira was born in "Kundpur", in the Videha kingdom. The Kalpa Sutra — a Svetambara text — uses the name "Kundagrama". Most Jains assert that the village of Basu Kund near the town of Vaishali is the location of the birthplace of Mahavira. However, some Jains of the Digambara sect have recently asserted that the village of Kundalpur in Nalanda district is the correct location.
