= Dahigaon =

Village in Maharashtra

- Village
- Location in Maharashtra, India Dahigaon (India)
- Coordinates: 19.9873889°N 72.8958535°E
- Country: India
- State: Maharashtra
- District: Palghar
- Taluka: Dahanu
- Elevation: 171 m (561 ft)

Population (2011)
  - Total: 655
- Time zone: UTC+5:30 (IST)
- 2011 census code: 551674

Dahigaon is a village in the Palghar district of Maharashtra, India. It is located in the Dahanu taluka. Dahigaon is famous for its Jain Temple.

== Demographics ==
According to the 2011 census of India, Dahigaon has 179 households. The effective literacy rate (i.e. the literacy rate of population excluding children aged 6 and below) is 37.59%.

Demographics (2011 Census)
	Total	Male	Female
Population	655	306	349
Children aged below 6 years	91	47	44
Scheduled caste	0	0	0
Scheduled tribe	655	306	349
Literates	212	134	78
Workers (all)	358	158	200
Main workers (total)	180	99	81
Main workers: Cultivators	142	73	69
Main workers: Agricultural labourers	33	22	11
Main workers: Household industry workers	0	0	0
Main workers: Other	5	4	1
Marginal workers (total)	178	59	119
Marginal workers: Cultivators	88	40	48
Marginal workers: Agricultural labourers	88	19	69
Marginal workers: Household industry workers	0	0	0
Marginal workers: Others	2	0	2
Non-workers	297	148	149

== Temple ==
Shri 1008 Mahavir Swami Digambar Jain Atisha Kshetra was built around 200 years ago by Jain muni Mahatisagarji. The mulnayak of this temple is a 5 feet black colored idol of Mahavir Swami in Padmasana posture. Idols of other tirthankars are also present here along with 18 feet idol of Bahubali in kayotsarga (Standing posture) and a 9 feet tall idol made of panch-dhatu (5 metal) dedicated to Rishabh dev.
