= Panch Kalyanaka =

Five auspicious life events of Jain Tirthankaras

Pancha Kalyanaka (Sanskrit: pan̄ca kalyāṇaka, "Five Auspicious Events") are the five chief auspicious events that occur in the life of tirthankara in Jainism. They are commemorated as part of many Jain rituals and festivals.

== Kalyanaka ==
These auspicious life events are as below:

1. Chyavana kalyāṇaka: When the ātman (soul) of a tirthankara enter's their mother's womb.
2. Janma kalyāṇaka: Birth of the tirthankara. Janmabhisheka is a ritual celebrating this event in which Indra does abhisheka with 1008 Kalasha (holy vessels) on the tirthankara on Mount Meru.
3. Dīkṣā kalyāṇaka: When a tirthankara renounce all worldly possessions and becomes an ascetic.
4. Kēvalajñāna kalyāṇaka: The event when a tirthankara attains kēvalajñāna (absolute knowledge). A divine samavasarana (preaching hall) appears, from where the tirthankara delivers sermons and restores the Jain community and teachings.
5. Nirvāṇa kalyāṇaka: When a tirthankara leaves their mortal body, it is known as nirvana. It is followed by final liberation, moksha. A tirthankara is considered a Siddha after that.
Pancha Kalyanaka of Mahavira, folios from Kalpasutra, loose leaf manuscript, Patan, Gujarat. c. 1472 (now in Brooklyn Museum)
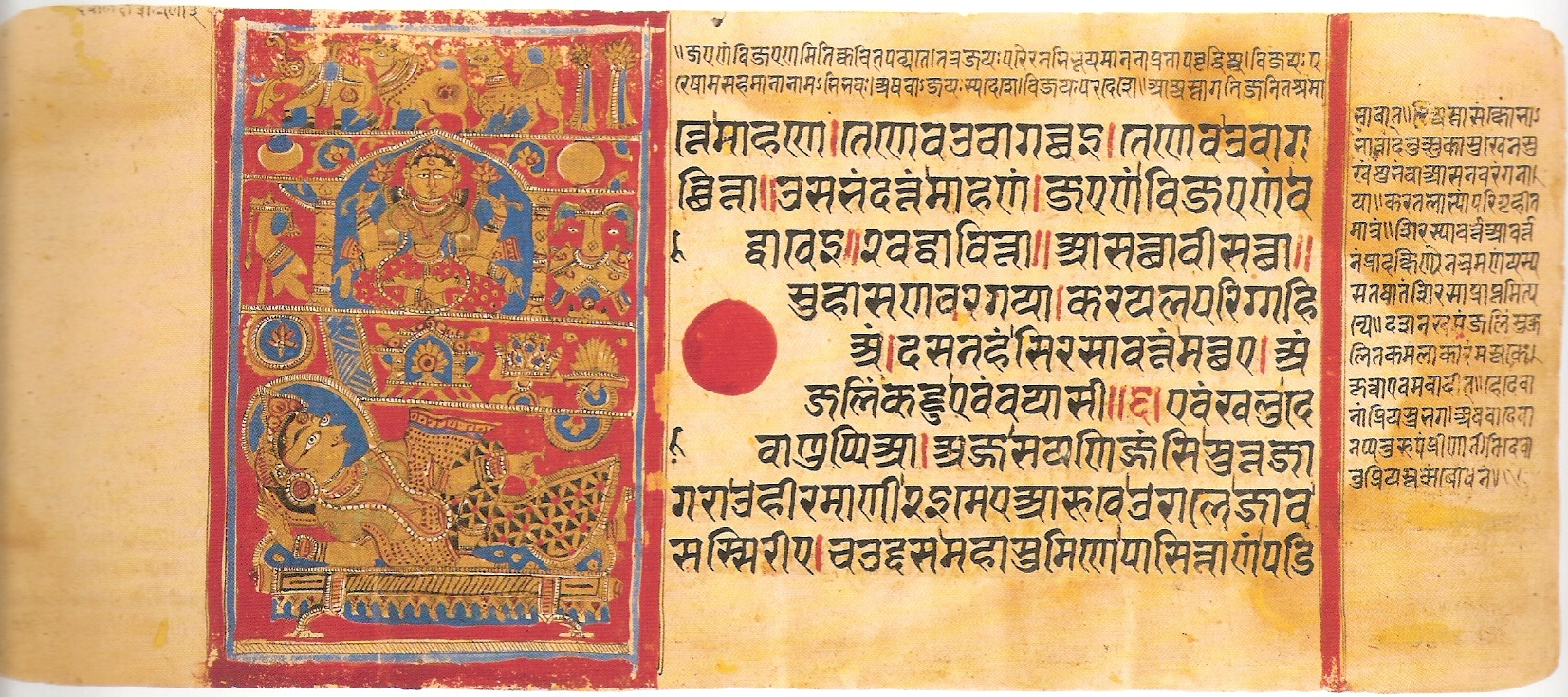
Chyavana kalyāṇaka

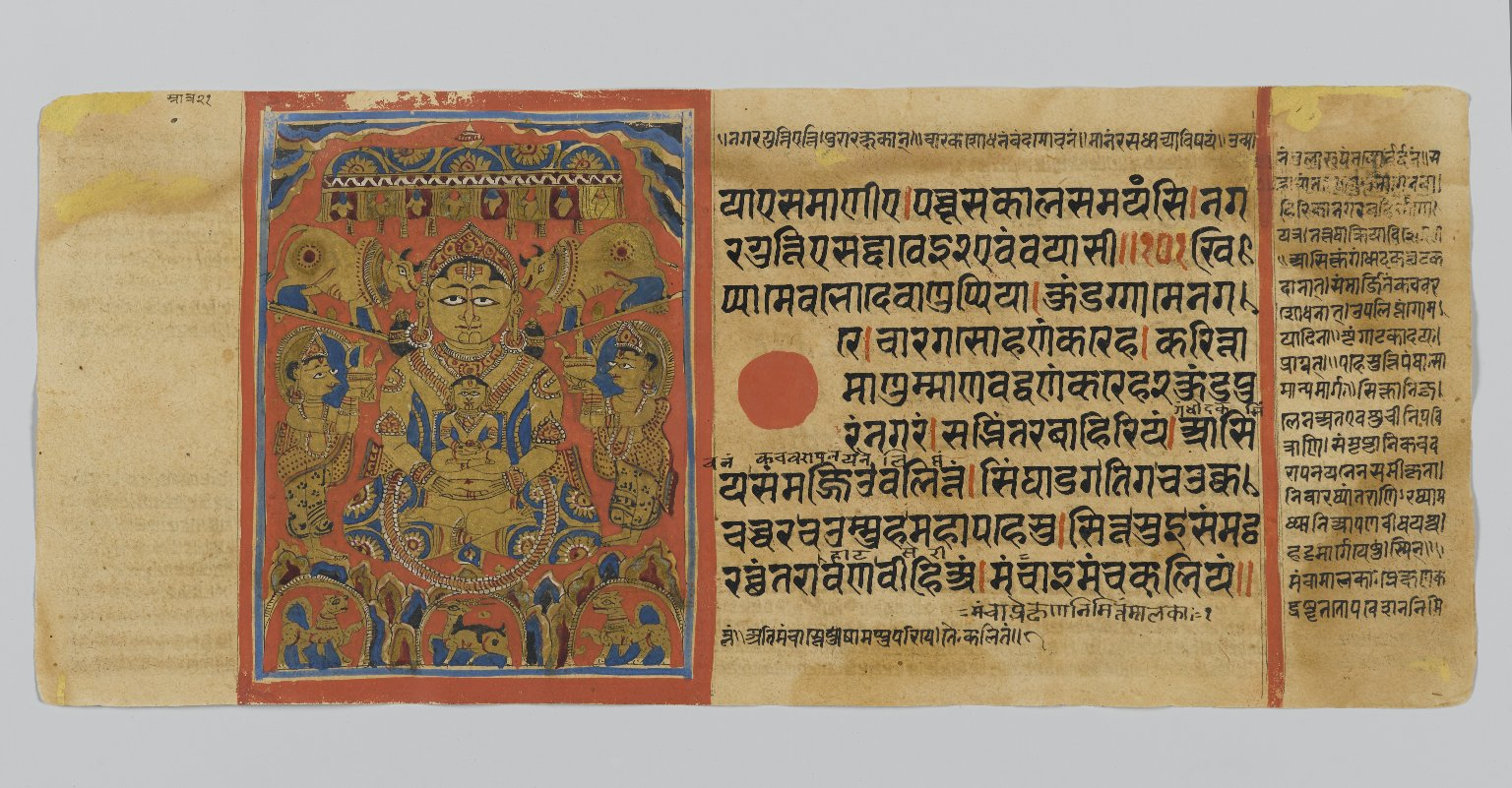
Janma kalyāṇaka

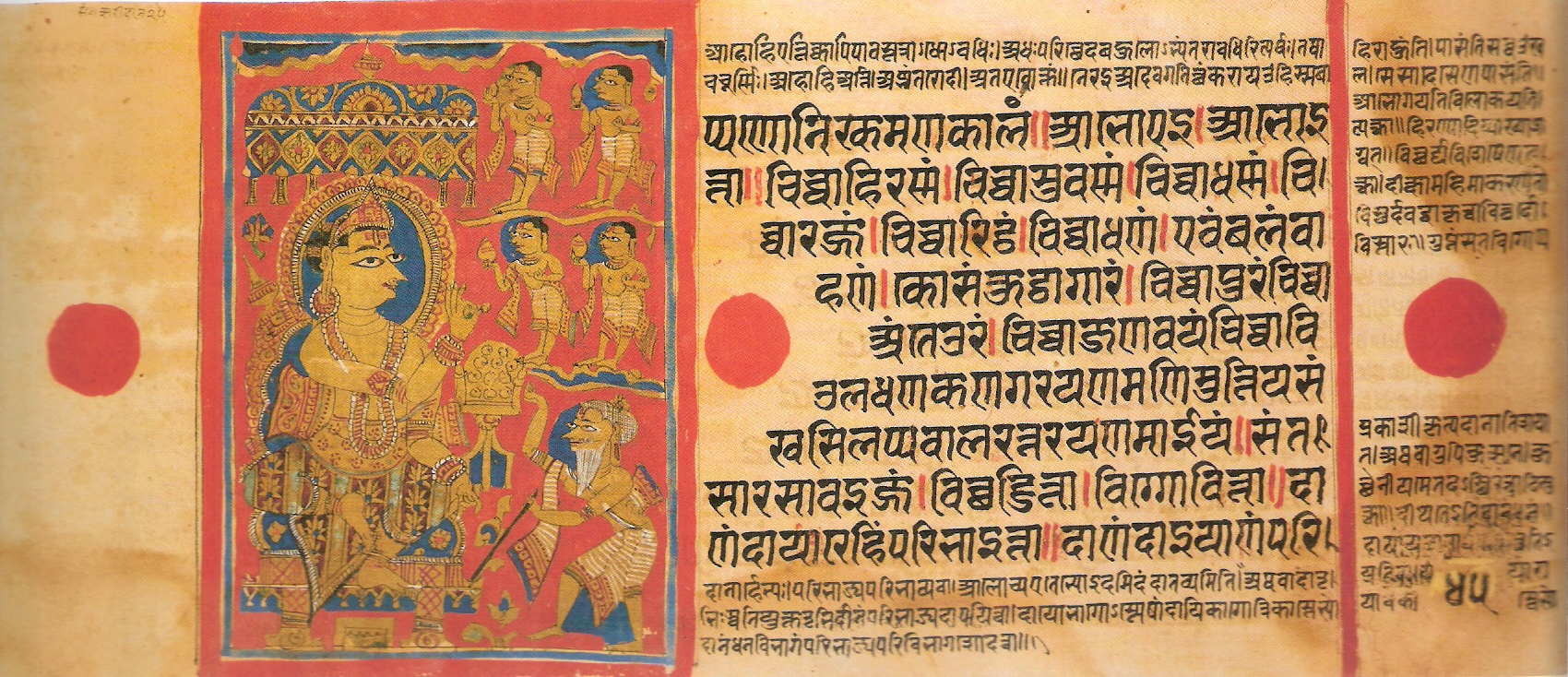
Dīkṣā kalyāṇaka

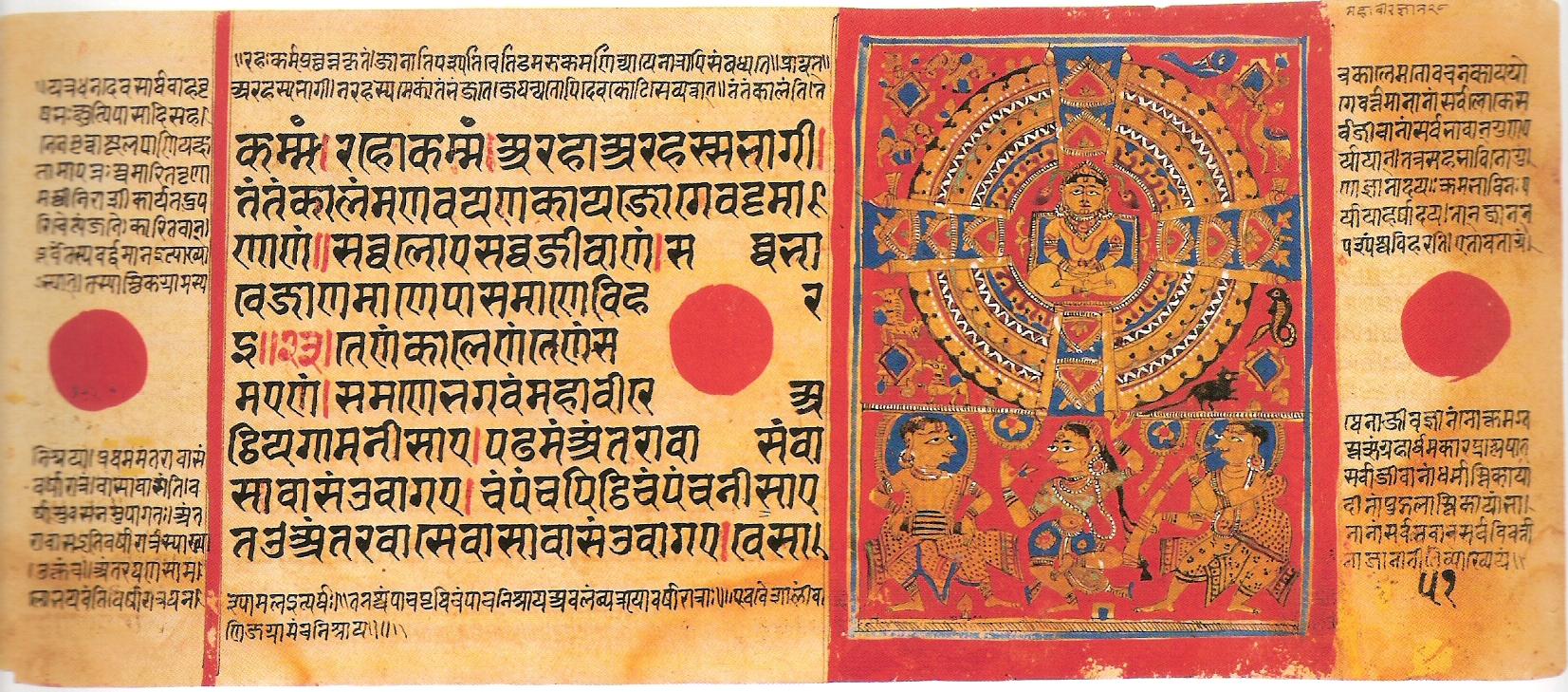
Kēvalajñāna kalyāṇaka

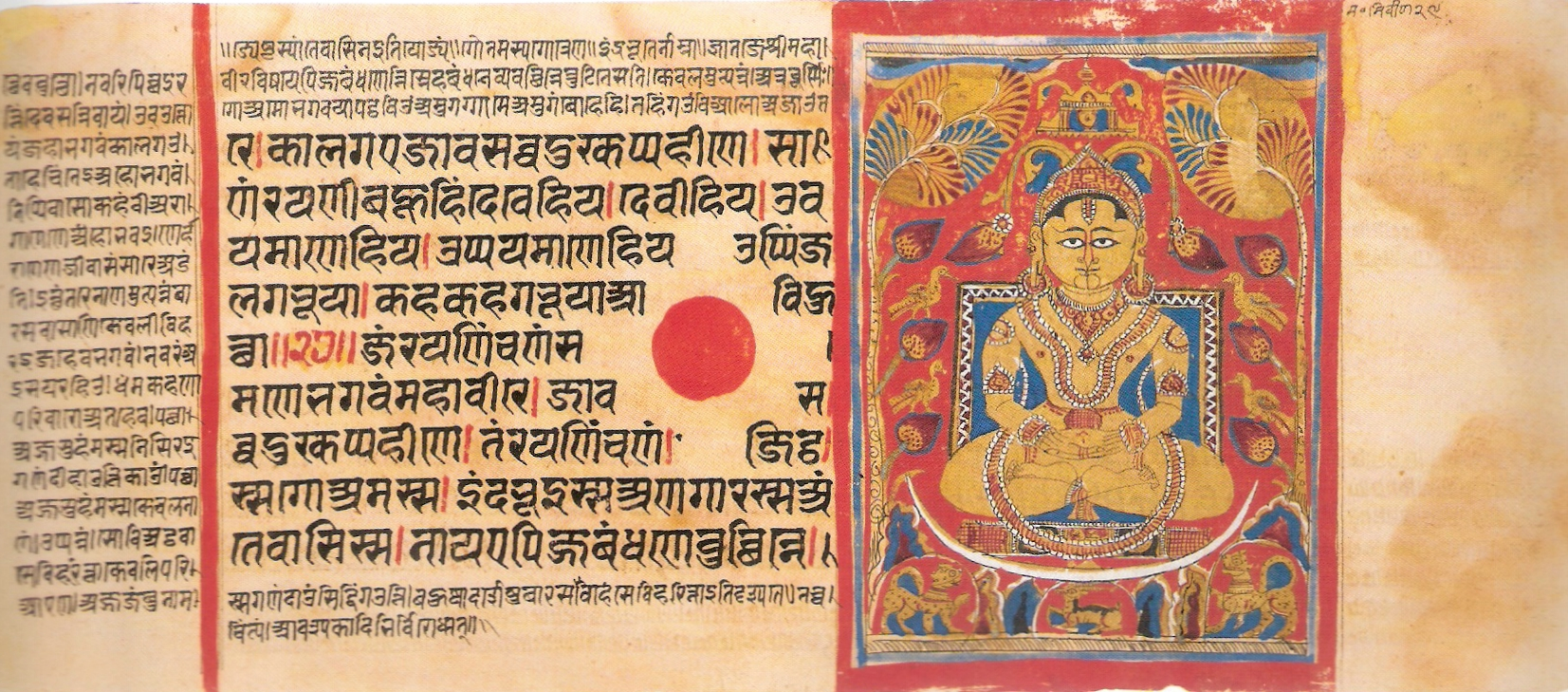
Nirvāṇa kalyāṇaka

== Kalyanaka Dates of 24 Tirthankara ==
These dates are called Kalyanaka Tithi. All dates are considered according to Jain calendar known as Jain Panchang based on the Vira Nirvana Samvat, but they differ according to different sects of Jain tradition and sometimes different within the same tradition also.

The following table states the Kalyanaka Tithis according to the Digambara Jain tradition from the Vira Nirvana Samvat Calendar.

No.	Tirthankara	Garbha Kalyanaka	Janma Kalyanaka	Tapa Kalyanaka	Jnana Kalyanaka	Nirvana Kalyanaka
1	Rishabhanatha	Ashadha Krishna 2	Chaitra Krishna 9	Chaitra Krishna 9	Falguna Krishna 11	Magha Krishna 14
2	Ajitanatha	Jyeshtha Krishna 15	Magha Shukla 10	Magha Shukla 10	Pausha Shukla 11	Chaitra Shukla 5
3	Sambhavanatha	Falguna Shukla 8	Kartika Shukla 15	Margashirsha Shukla 15	Kartika Krishna 4	Chaitra Shukla 6
4	Abhinandananatha	Vaishakha Shukla 6	Magha Shukla 12	Magha Shukla 12	Pausha Shukla 14	Vaishakha Shukla 6
5	Sumatinatha	Shravana Shukla 2	Chaitra Shukla 11	Vaishakha Shukla 9	Chaitra Shukla 11	Chaitra Shukla 11
6	Padmaprabhu	Magha Krishna 6	Kartika Krishna 13	Kartika Krishna 13	Chaitra Shukla 15	Falguna Krishna 4
7	Suparshvanatha	Bhadrapada Shukla 6	Jyeshtha Shukla 12	Jyeshtha Krishna 12	Falguna Krishna 6	Falguna Krishna 7
8	Chandraprabhu	Chaitra Krishna 5	Pausha Krishna 11	Pausha Krishna 11	Falguna Krishna 7	Falguna Krishna 7
9	Pushpadanta	Falguna Krishna 9	Margashirsha Krishna 1	Margashirsha Shukla 1	Kartika Shukla 2	Bhadrapada Shukla 8
10	Shitalanatha	Chaitra Krishna 8	Magha Krishna 12	Magha Krishna 12	Pausha Krishna 14	Ashvina Shukla 8
11	Shreyansanatha	Jyeshtha Krishna 6	Falguna Krishna 11	Falguna Krishna 11	Magha Krishna 15	Shravana Shukla 15
12	Vasupujya	Ashadha Krishna 6	Falguna Krishna 14	Falguna Krishna 14	Magha Shukla 2	Bhadrapada Shukla 14
13	Vimalanatha	Jyeshtha Krishna 10	Magha Shukla 4	Magha Shukla 4	Magha Shukla 6	Ashadha Krishna 8
14	Anantanatha	Kartika Krishna 1	Jyeshtha Krishna 12	Jyeshtha Krishna 12	Chaitra Krishna 15	Chaitra Krishna 15
15	Dharmanatha	Vaishakha Krishna 14	Magha Shukla 13	Magha Shukla 13	Pausha Shukla 15	Jyeshtha Shukla 4
16	Shantinatha	Bhadrapada Krishna 7	Jyeshtha Krishna 14	Jyeshtha Krishna 14	Pausha Shukla 10	Jyeshtha Krishna 14
17	Kunthunatha	Shravana Shukla 10	Vaishakha Shukla 1	Vaishakha Shukla 1	Chaitra Shukla 3	Vaishakha Shukla 1
18	Arahanatha	Falguna Shukla 3	Margashirsha Shukla 14	Margashirsha Shukla 10	Kartika Shukla 12	Chaitra Krishna 15
19	Mallinatha	Chaitra Shukla 1	Margashirsha Shukla 11	Margashirsha Shukla 11	Pausha Krishna 2	Falguna Shukla 5
20	Munisuvrata	Shravana Krishna 2	Vaishakha Krishna 10	Vaishakha Krishna 10	Vaishakha Krishna 9	Falguna Krishna 12
21	Naminatha	Ashvina Krishna 2	Ashadha Krishna 10	Ashadha Krishna 10	Margashirsha Shukla 11	Vaishakha Krishna 14
22	Neminatha	Kartika Shukla 6	Shravana Shukla 6	Shravana Shukla 6	Ashvina Shukla 1	Ashadha Shukla 7
23	Parshvanatha	Vaishakha Krishna 2	Pausha Krishna 11	Pausha Krishna 11	Chaitra Krishna 4	Shravana Shukla 7
24	Mahavira	Ashadha Shukla 6	Chaitra Shukla 13	Margashirsha Krishna 10	Vaishakha Shukla 10	Kartika Krishna 15

Note: This list is according to Śvētāmbara tradition and months are according to the Gujarati calendar.

No.	Tirthankara	Chyavana Kalyanaka	Janma Kalyanaka	Diksha Kalyanaka	Kevala Jnana Kalyanaka	Nirvana Kalyanaka
1	Rishabha	Jeth Vad 4	Fagan Vad 8	Fagan Vad 8	Maha Vad 11	Posh Vad 13
2	Ajitanatha	Vaisakh Sud 13	Maha Sud 8	Maha Sud 9	Posh Sud 11	Chaitra Sud 5
3	Sambhavanatha	Fagan Sud 8	Magsar Sud 14	Magasar Sud 15	Asho Vad 5	Chaitra Sud 5
4	Abhinandananatha	Vaisakh Sud 4	Maha Sud 2	Maha Sud 12	Posh Sud 14	Vaisakh Sud 8
5	Sumatinatha	Shravan Sud 2	Vaisakh Sud 8	Vaisakh Sud 9	Chaitra Sud 11	Chaitra Sud 9
6	Padmaprabha	Posh Vad 6	Asho Vad 12	Asho Vad 13	Chaitra Sud 11	Chaitra Sud 9
7	Suparshvanatha	Shravan Vad 8	Jeth Sud 12	Jeth Sud 13	Maha Vad 6	Maha Vad 7
8	Chandraprabha	Fagan Vad 5	Magasar Vad 12	Magasar Vad 13	Maha Vad 7	Shravan Vad 7
9	Pushpadanta	Maha Vad 9	Kartak Vad 5	Kartak Vad 6	Kartak Sud 3	Bhadarva Sud 9
10	Shitalanatha	Chaitra Vad 6	Posh Vad 12	Posh Vad 13	Magasar Vad 14	Chaitra Vad 2
11	Shreyanasanatha	Vaisakh Vad 6	Maha Vad 12	Maha Vad 13	Posh Vad Amaas	Ashadh Vad 3
12	Vasupujya	Jeth Sud 9	Maha Vad 14	Maha Vad Amaas	Maha Sud 2	Asadh Sud 14
13	Vimalanatha	Vaisakh Sud 12	Maha Sud 3	Maha Sud 4	Posh Sud 6	Jeth Vad 7
14	Anantanatha	Asadh Vad 7	Chaitra Vad 13	Chaitra Vad 14	Chaitra Vad 14	Chaitra Sud 5
15	Dharmanatha	Vaisakh Sud 7	Maha Sud 3	Maha Sud 12	Posh sud 15	Jeth Sud 5
16	Shantinatha	Shravan Vad 7	Vaishakh Vad 13	Vaiskh Vad 14	Posh Sud 9	Vaisakh Vad 13
17	Kunthunatha	Asadh Vad 9	Chaitra Vad 14	Chaitra Vad 5	Chaitra Vad 5	Chaitra Vad 1
18	Aranatha	Fagan Sud 2	Magsar Sud 10	Magsar Sud 11	Kartik Sud 12	Magsar Sud 10
19	Māllīnātha	Fagan Sud 4	Magsar Sud 11	Magsar Sud 11	Magsar Sud 11	Fagan Sud 12
20	Munisuvrata	Shravan Sud 15	Vaisakh Vad 8	Fagan Sud 12	Shravan Vad 12	Vaisakh Vad 9
21	Naminatha	Asho Sud 15	Ashadh Vad 8	Jeth Vad 9	Magsar Sud 11	Chaitra Vad 10
22	Neminatha	Asho Vad 12	Shravan Sud 5	Shravan Sud 6	Bhadarva Vad Amaas	Ashadh Sud 8
23	Parshvanatha	Fagan Vad 4	Magsar Vad 10	Magsar Vad 11	Fagan Vad 4	Shravan Sud 7
24	Mahavira	Asadh Sud 6	Chaitra Sud 13	Kartak Vad 10	Vaisakh Sud 10	Asho Vad Amaas

Keys

- Dates are in short format. For example, Kartika Shukla 15 means Fifteenth day of Bright fortnight (waxing fortnight) (Sud) of Kartika month, or the Full moon day of the Kartika month.
- s: according to Śvētāmbara tradition
- d: according to Digambara tradition
- o: according to other sources

== Kalyanaka Places of 24 Tirthankara ==
Kalyanaka Bhumi are places where any of these Kalyanaka took place in relation to 24 Tirthankara. They are considered places of pilgrimage by Jains. 20 out of 24 Tirthankaras' Nirvana kalyanaka took place at Shikharji.

They are as below:

No.	Tirthankara	Chyavan Kalyanaka	Janma Kalyanaka	Diksha Kalyanaka	Keval Gyan Kalyanaka	Nirvan Kalyanaka
1	Rishabha	Ayodhya			Purimtal ( now Prayag or Allahabad)	Ashtapad
2	Ajitnath	Ayodhya				Shikharji
3	Sambhavanath	Shravasti				Shikharji
4	Abhinandananatha	Ayodhya				Shikharji
5	Sumatinath	Ayodhya				Shikharji
6	Padmaprabha	Kausambi				Shikharji
7	Suparshvanath	Bhadaini, Varanasi				Shikharji
8	Chandraprabha	Chandrapuri				Shikharji
9	Suvidhinatha	Kakandi (now Khukhundu, Deoria district)				Shikharji
10	Sheetalnath	Bhadilpur or Bhadrikapuri				Shikharji
11	Shreyansanath	Sinhpuri, Varanasi				Shikharji
12	Vasupujya	Champapuri (now Bhagalpur)				
13	Vimalnath	Kampilya				Shikharji
14	Anantnath	Ayodhya				Shikharji
15	Dharmanath	Ratnapuri				Shikharji
16	Shantinath	Hastinapur				Shikharji
17	Kunthunath	Hastinapur				Shikharji
18	Aranath	Hastinapur				Shikharji
19	Mallinath	Mithila				Shikharji
20	Munisuvrata	Rajgruhi				Shikharji
21	Naminatha	Mithila				Shikharji
22	Neminatha	Sauripur		Girnar		
23	Parshva	Varanasi			Ahichchhatra	Shikharji
24	Mahavira	Kundalagrama (Kshatriya Kund) near Vaishali			Rijuvalika	Pavapuri

== Rituals ==
Some Jain rituals have close relationship with these five Kalyanakas. Pancha Kalyanaka Puja is a ritual solemnizes all five Kalyanaka. It was narrated by Pandit Virvijay. Snatra Puja is a ritual related to Janma Kalyanaka in which icons of Tirthankara are bathed symbolising Indra doing Abhisheka on Tirthankara on Mount Meru after birth of Tirthankara. It performed before many other rituals and before starting of new enterprises, birthdays.

When a new Jain Temple is erected, these Five Auspicious Life Events are celebrated known as Pancha Kalyanaka Pratishtha Mahotsava. It is followed by Anjana Shalaka, a ceremony to install new Tirthankara icon. An Acharya recite mantras related to Panch Kalyanaka followed by applying special paste to eyes of Tirthankara (as per Shwetambar tradition) image. After these an icons of Tirthankara gets a status of real Tirthankara which can be worshipped by Jains. Acharya have to fast for three days before that.

== Festivals ==
Many Jain festivals mark Kalyanaka of Tirthankara especially Janma and Nirvana Kalyanaka.

Mahavir Janma Kalyanak marks Janma Kalyanak (birth) of 24th Tirthankara, Mahavira. Abhisheka of icons are done on this day and procession celebrating this event takes place in the cities. It is on 13th day of bright half of Chaitra month of Jain calendar (March/April).

Diwali is a day of Nirvana Kalyanaka of Mahavira. He attained Moksha on this day in 527 BCE. It falls on fifteenth day of dark half of Ashwin (Aaso) month (September/October) which is also a last day of a year.

Pausha Dashmi is celebrated on 10th day of dark half of Pausha (Pushya) month of Hindu calendar(December/January). It marks Janma kalyanaka (birth) of 23rd Tirthankara, Parshvanath. Three days fast is observed by many Jains.

Maun Agiyaras or Ekadashi marks Kalyanaka of many Tirthankaras. It is celebrated on 11th day of Magshar month of Jain calendar (October/November). On this day, complete silence is observed and fasting is kept. Meditation is also performed.

== See also ==
- Pañca-Parameṣṭhi
- God in Jainism
- Jain symbols
