= Jain festivals =

Religious festivals

Jain festivals occur on designated days of the year. Jain festivals are either related to life events of Tirthankara or they are performed with intention of purification of soul.

== Festivals ==
There are many religious festivals in Jainism. Some of them are associated with five auspicious life events of Tirthankara known as Panch Kalyanaka. Jains celebrate many annual festivals. Many of the major festivals in Jainism fall in and around the chaomasa (Sanskrit: chaturmasa) period of the calendar. It is the four-month monsoon period when the Jain ascetics are mandated to remain in residence at one place in the Jain tradition, rather than be traveling or going around Indian villages and towns and never staying in one place for more than a month. The chomasa period allows the four orders of the Jain community to be together and participate in the festive remembrances.

=== Paryushana ===
Paryushana Parva is one of the most important festival for Jains. Paryusana is formed by two words meaning 'a year' and 'a coming back'. This festival comes in the months of Shravana and Bhadra (August or September). Śvetāmbara Jains celebrate it for eight-days while Digambara Jains celebrate it for ten days and their first day coincides with the eight day of Svetambara Jains. Digambara Paryushana Parva is commonly known as Das Lakshana Parva. It is a festival of repentance and forgiveness. Many Jains fast and carry out different religious activities. Jain monks stop walking during chaturmas and reside at one place where they lecture on various religious subjects during paryushana. This festival is believed to remove accumulated karma of the previous year and develop control over new accumulating new karma, by following Jain austerities and other rituals. There are regular rituals at the Jain temples. Discourses of Kalpa Sutra are given by monks. Kalpa Sutra describes life of Mahavira and other Tirthankaras. On the third day, procession of Kalpa Sutra is carried out. On the fifth day, auspicious dreams of Trishala, mother of Mahavira are demonstrated and after that birth of Mahavira is celebrated. The tenth day of festival is called Anant Chaturdashi. Anant Chaturdashi is the day when Lord Vasupujya attained moksha (nirvan). Usually, a procession is taken out by Jains on this day. Kshamavani is generally observed a day after Anant Chaturdashi by digambaras, while the shwetambaras observe it after the 8th ie the last day of their paryushan.(last day is called samvatsari) On Kshamavani, Jains ask for forgiveness from everybody for any acts during the previous year which may have hurt them.

=== Janma kalayanak ===
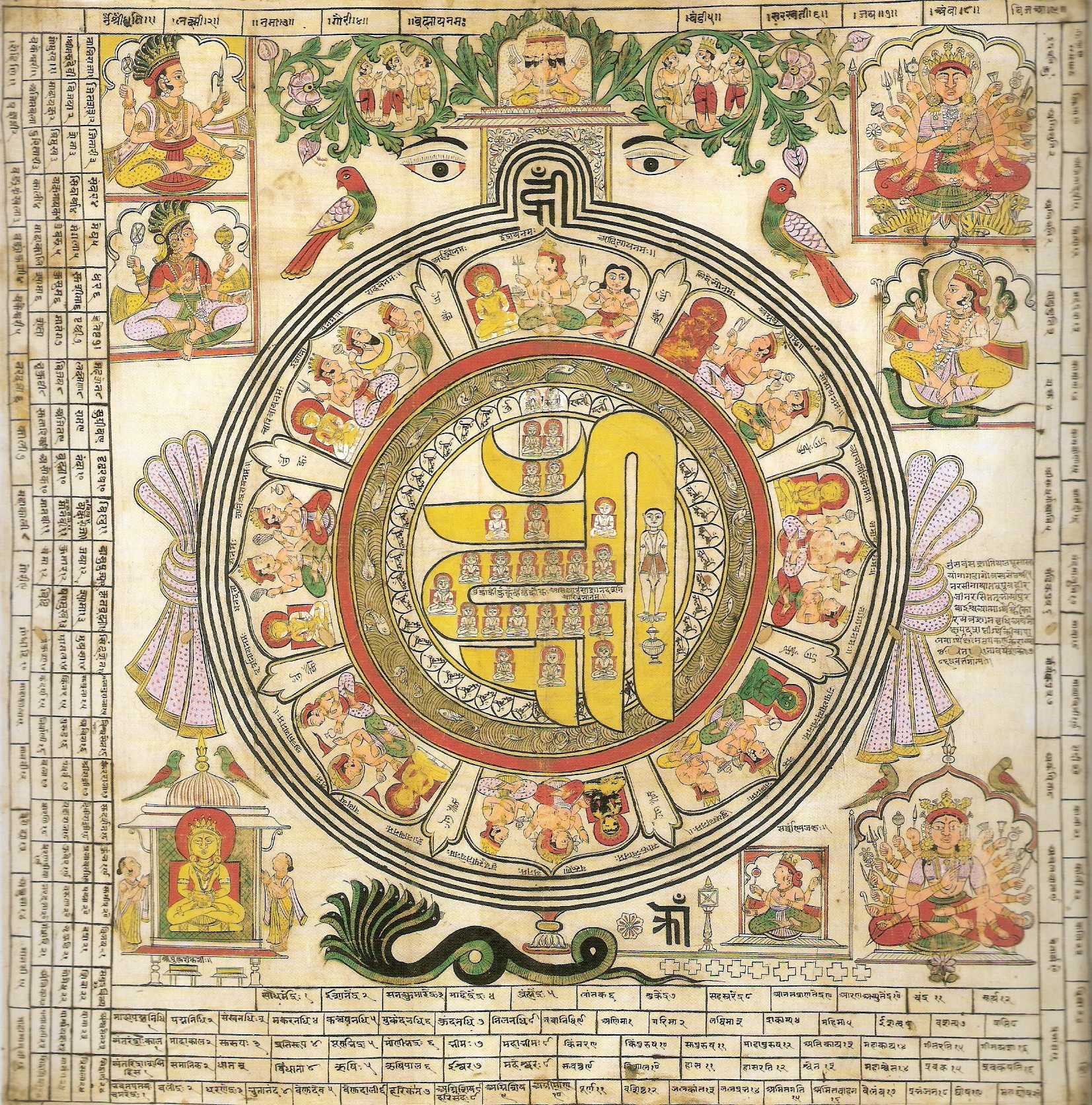
Om Hrim Siddhi Chakra used by Jains in dravya puja

Mahavira was born on the thirteenth day of the bright half of the Jain calendar month of Chaitra, probably 599 BCE. It falls in March or April. This festival marks the birth of lord Mahavira (last, 24th tirtankara). Procession is carried out and lectures on the message of Mahavira are presented. The idols of Mahavira are ceremonially bathed and rocked in a cradle. Events related to birth are also recited from sacred texts by monks.

=== Akshaya Tritiya ===
In Jainism, Akshaya Tritiya is an important festival as it commemorates the first Tirthankara, Rishabhanatha, ending his 400-day-long fast by consuming sugarcane juice poured into his cupped hands. Śvetāmbara Jains perform a similar fast (but consume food on alternate days) that lasts 400 days. This practice is popularly known as Varshitapa. Rishabhanatha renounced worldly pleasures and turned into a monk. Thereafter, he fasted for 400 days (as per the Śvetāmbara tradition) or six months (as per the Digambara tradition). He did not accept food from lay followers as every time he was given food, it was not 'free of faults' as it should be for a Jain monk to accept. The 42 faults that food given to a Jain monk may have are discussed at length in the ancient Śvetāmbara text Ācārāṅga Sūtra.

=== Ashtahnika Parv ===
This is a Jain festival celebrated for eight days three times a year in the months of Kartik, Falgun and Ashdah. It is celebrated from eighth day of Shukla Paksh (Waxing moon Cycle) till Purnima/Guru Purnima every year.

=== Nandishwar Ashtahnika ===
The Nandishwara island is surrounded by three mountain ranges called the Anjana mountain, the Dadhimukha mountain, and the Ratikara mountain. Since human beings are unable to go to Nandishwar dweep they worship in temples. Jains Perform Special Pooja, SiddhChakra Vidhan, Nandishwar Vidhan and Mandal Vidhan..

The word Ashta meaning eight and Aanika meaning every day. When the festival falls in the months of Aashad and Phalguna, then the ritual is known as Nandishwar Ashtahnika. This ritual helps to gain greater spiritual insight, and wisdom. The observance of this ritual brings wish fulfilment for the devotees.

=== Diwali ===
Diwali is one of the most important festival in India. Mahavir attained nirvana followed by moksha on this day in 527 BCE. It falls on the last day of Ashvina month of Jain calendar. It is also the last day of Indian calendar. It comes during October or November. It is believed that the eighteen kings of northern India, followers of Mahavira, decided to light lamps (known as dipa) symbolizing knowledge of Mahavira. So it is known as Deepavali or Diwali. Jains are forbidden to burst crackers. On Diwali morning, Nirvan Ladoo is offered after praying to Lord Mahavira in all Jain temples all across the world. Gautam Gandhar Swami, the chief disciple of Lord Mahavira achieved omniscience (Kevala Gyan) later the same day.

=== New Year ===
After celebrating Diwali at the end of Ashwina, Jains celebrate new year on the first day of the following month of Kartika. Ritual of Snatra Puja is performed at the temple. Mahavira's chief disciple Gautama Swami attained keval gyan on this day.

=== Gyana Panchami ===
The fifth day of Kartika is known as Gyana Panchami. It is considered knowledge day. On this day holy scriptures are displayed and worshipped. On this day, people sometimes bow down to books and pencils

=== Pausha Dashmi ===
It is celebrated on 10th day of dark half of Pausha (Pushya) month of Jain calendar(December/January). It marks Janma Kalyanaka (Birth) of 23rd Tirthankara Parshvanatha. Three days fast known as Attham is observed by many Jains.

=== Maun agiyaras ===
Maun Agiyaras or Ekadashi marks Kalyanaka of 150 Tirthankaras. It is celebrated on 11th day of Magshar month of Jain calendar (October/November). On this day, complete silence is observed and fasting is kept. Meditation is also performed.

=== Navapad Oli ===
The nine-day Oli is a period of semi-fasting. During these period Jains take only one meal a day of food without ghee etc., oils, or any kind of spices. It comes twice a year during March/April and September/October.

=== Mahamastakabhisheka ===
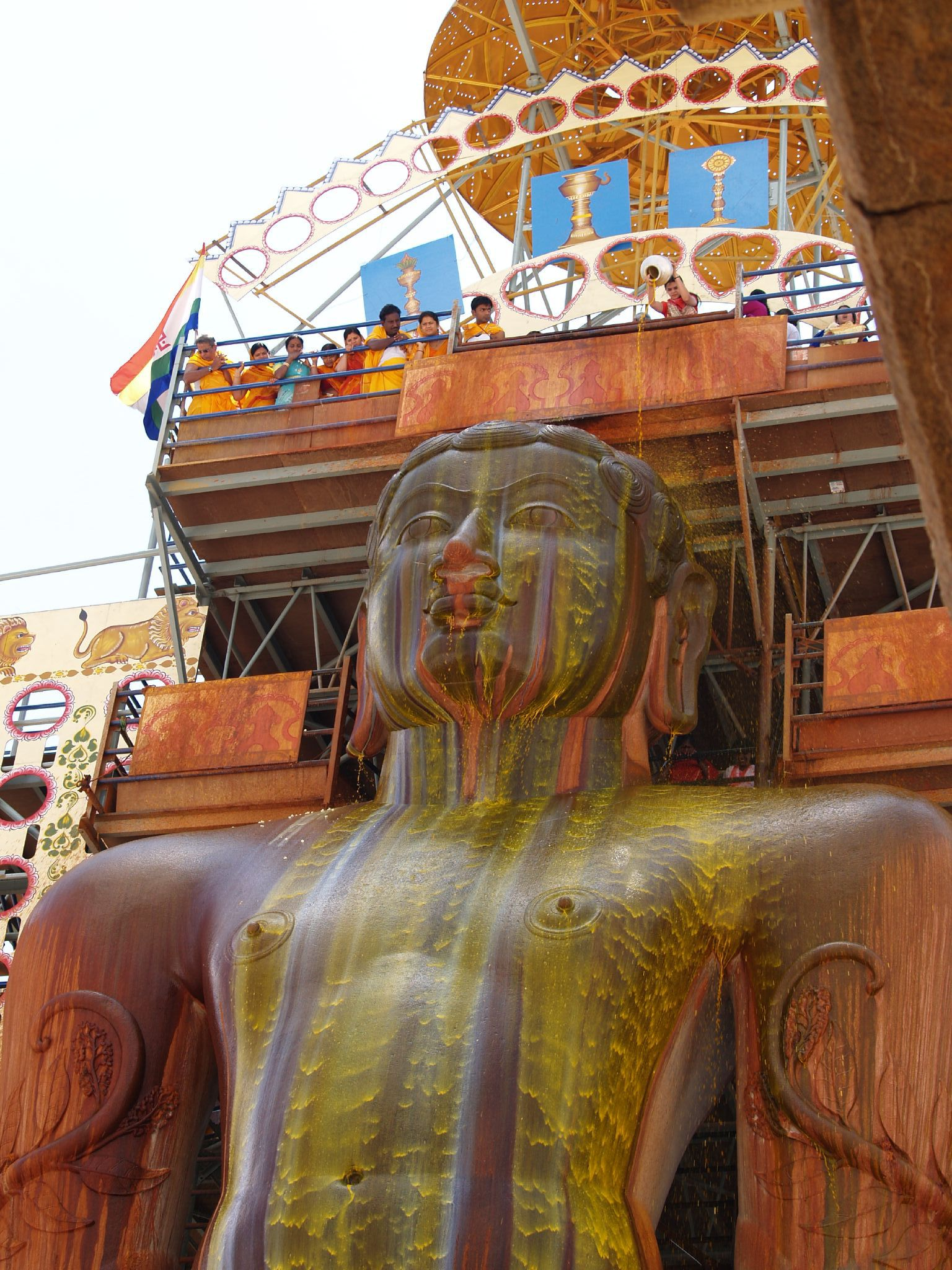
Gommateshvara Bahubali, Mahamastakabhisheka festival, 2006

Mahamastakabhisheka is a festival held once every twelve years in the town of Shravanabelagola, Karnataka. It is held in veneration of an immense 18 meter high statue of Bahubali. The last anointing took place in February 2018, and the next ceremony will occur in 2030.

=== Roth Teej ===
Roth Teej is celebrated on Bhadrapada Shukla Tritiya. On Roth Teej, the Jains are supposed to eat only one type of grain food, roth, once during the day. The festival is a reminder that material wealth is not important, only relinquishment leads to true happiness.

=== Shrut Panchami ===
Shrut Panchami is celebrated by Jains every year in the month of May commemorating Acharya Pushpadanta and Bhutabali.

=== Kartika Purnima ===
Kartika Purnima is an important religious day for Jains who celebrate it by visiting Palitana, a Jain pilgrimage centre. Thousands of Jain pilgrims flock to the foothills of Shatrunjay hills of Palitana taluka on the day of Kartika Purnima to undertake the auspicious yatra (journey). Also known as the Shri Shantrunjay Teerth Yatra, this walk is an important religious event in the life of a Jain devotee, who covers 216 km of rough mountainous terrain on foot to worship at the Adinath temple atop the hill. The day of Kartika Purnima is very significant in Jainism.Jains believe that Adinath, the first tirthankara, sanctified the hills by visiting it to deliver his first sermon. According to Jain texts, millions of sadhus and Sadhvis have attained salvation on these hills.

=== Raksha Bandhan ===
In Jainism, Raksha Bandhan is a prominent festival celebrated to commemorate the protection of the Jain monastic community. According to traditional Jain narratives, the festival originated when a Jain monk named Vishnukumar saved the lives of 700 Digambara monks, led by the ascetic Akampanacharya. The monks were being severely persecuted in Hastinapur by four antagonistic ministers, led by Bali, who had temporarily secured ruling powers from the king.

To rescue the ascetics, Vishnukumar utilized his supernatural shape-shifting abilities (vikriya riddhi) to assume the form of a dwarf Brahmin (Vamana). He approached Bali and requested a charitable gift of three paces of land. Once Bali agreed, Vishnukumar expanded his physical body to cosmic proportions, covering Mount Sumeru with his first step and the Manushottara mountain with his second. With no space remaining for the third pace, a defeated Bali offered his own back, resulting in his submission and the survival of the monks on the full moon day of Shravana.

Following the rescue, Vishnukumar repented for utilizing his supernatural powers and reassumed his traditional ascetic life. To commemorate the event, citizens tied threads around each other's wrists as a collective pledge to continuously protect the Jain dharma and its ascetics. In modern observances, the festival remains highly revered within the Jain community, where devotees and priests tie ceremonial threads to symbolize spiritual protection, communal solidarity, and religious devotion.

== See also ==
- God in Jainism
- Kshamavani
- Jain cosmology
