= Naminatha =

21st Jain Tirthankara

- 21st Tirthankara
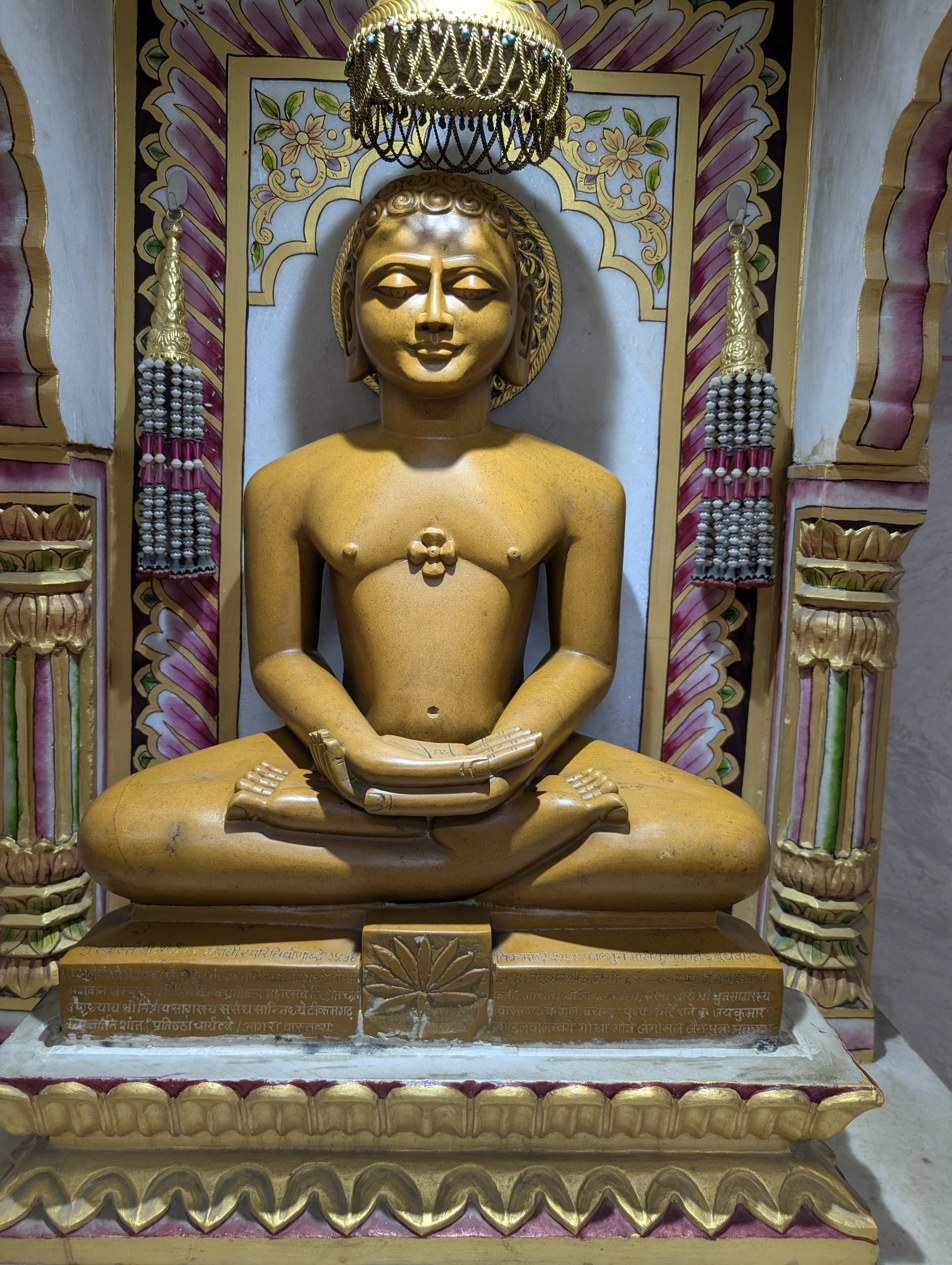
- Naminatha idol at Mathura Chaurasi Digambara Jain Temple, Uttar Pradesh
- Venerated in: Jainism
- Predecessor: Munisuvrata
- Successor: Neminatha
- Symbol: Blue Water Lily
- Height: 15 bows (45 metres)
- Age: 10,000
- Color: Golden
- Gender: Male

Genealogy
- Born: Mithila
- Died: Sammed Shikhar
- Parents: Vijaya (father); Vaprā (mother)
- Dynasty: Ikṣvākuvaṁśa

Naminatha (Devanagari: नमिनाथ) (Sanskrit: नमिनाथः) was the 21st tirthankara of the present half time cycle, Avsarpini. He was born to the King Vijaya and Queen Vipra of the Ikshvaku dynasty. King Vijaya was the ruler of Mithila at that time. Naminatha is said to have lived for 10,000 years. When Naminatha was in his mother's womb, Mithila was attacked by a group of powerful kings. The aura of Naminatha forced all the kings to surrender to his father. (Unverified)

== Nomenclature ==
The name Naminatha is derived from the Sanskrit root naman, which translates to "bowing down" or "surrender." According to Jain universal history, he received this specific name because his aura pacified his father's enemies, causing them to bow down and surrender their weapons without a battle while he was still in his mother's womb.

== Life and Legends ==
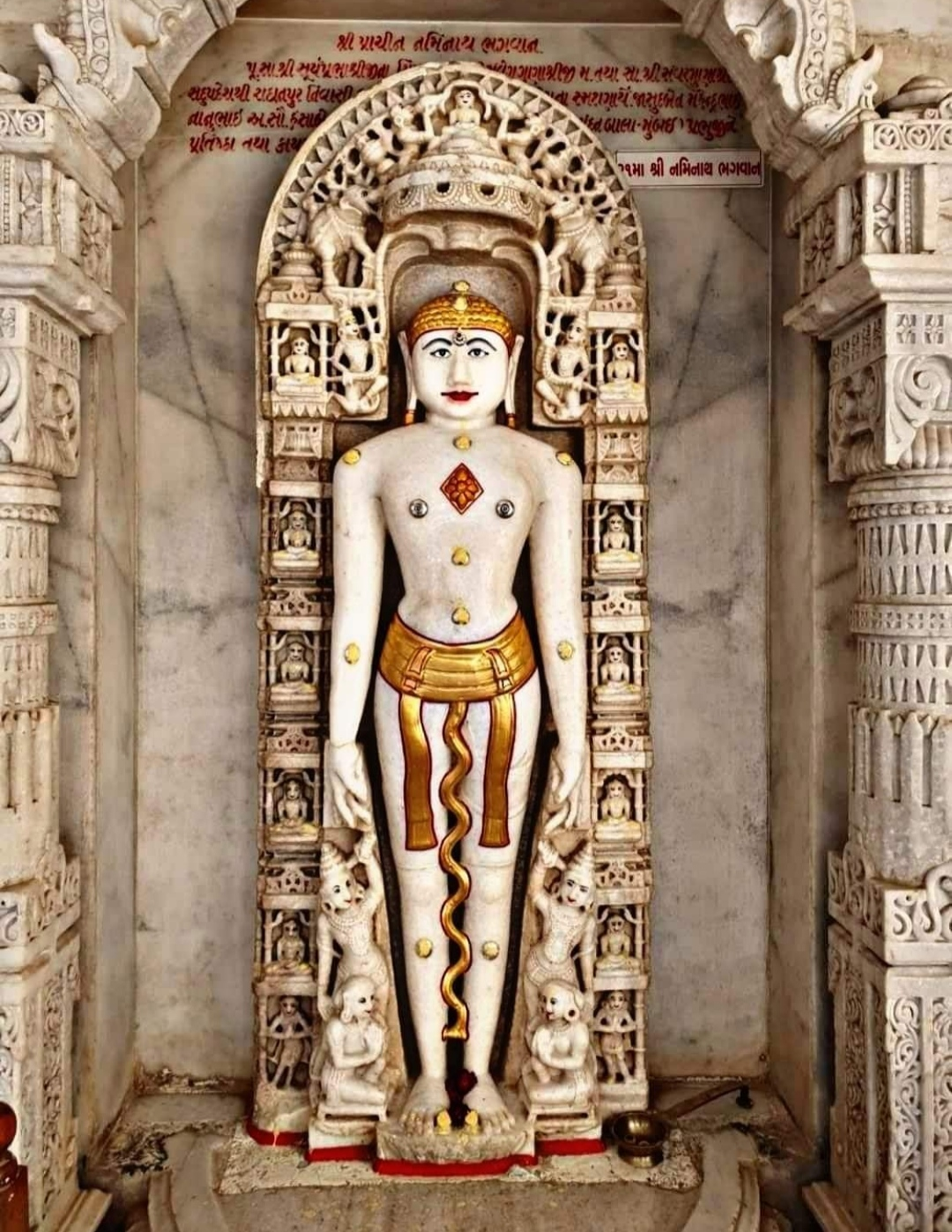
Naminatha idol in Svetambara depiction

According to Jain tradition, Naminatha is said to have liberated his soul by destroying all of his karma and attained Moksha from Sammed Shikhar nearly 571,750 years before his successor, Neminatha. He was preceded by Munisuvrata who is believed to have lived 9 lakh years before his birth.

=== Birth and the Siege of Mithila ===
Naminatha was born into the ancient Ikshvaku dynasty to King Vijaya and Queen Vapra (or Vipra) in the city of Mithila. Jain texts place his birth on the 8th day of the Shravan Krishna month of the lunisolar Jain calendar.

His defining mythological narrative occurs before his birth. According to traditional accounts, while Queen Vapra was pregnant with Naminatha, the kingdom of Mithila was besieged by a powerful coalition of rival kings. The conflict threatened to destroy the city. However, the spiritual aura and karmic purity of the unborn tirthankara projected such intense peace that the attacking kings were overcome with extreme pacification. They voluntarily halted their siege, entered the city to surrender to King Vijaya, and paid their respects. This bloodless victory solidified his status as a supreme pacifist even before his physical birth.

His height is mentioned as 15 bows (dhanusha).

=== Renunciation and Omniscience ===
Jain texts describe Naminatha as a highly reluctant ruler who viewed worldly power as a karmic trap. After ruling Mithila for a period, he chose the path of absolute renunciation (diksha). He abandoned his royal title, his wealth, and his kingdom to become a Jain monk.

He performed severe austerities and meditated deeply. According to tradition, he attained omniscience (Kevala Jnana) while meditating under a Bakula tree (Mimusops elengi). Following his enlightenment, he established his monastic order (sangha), which was led by his 17 chief disciple (Ganadhara), Suprabha being their leader.

=== Nirvana ===
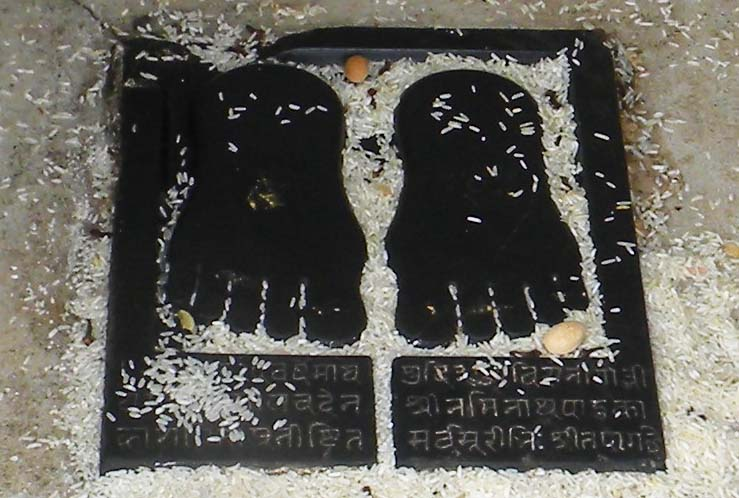
Footprints at Naminath Tonk, Shikharji

After spreading the doctrines of nonviolence (ahimsa) and non-attachment (aparigraha) for a lifespan traditionally cited as 10,000 years, Naminatha traveled to Mount Shikharji (Sammed Shikhar) in modern-day Jharkhand. He attained liberation from the cycle of rebirth (moksha) on this mountain, making him one of the 20 tirthankaras to achieve final liberation at this universally revered Jain geographic site.

== Temples and Legacy ==
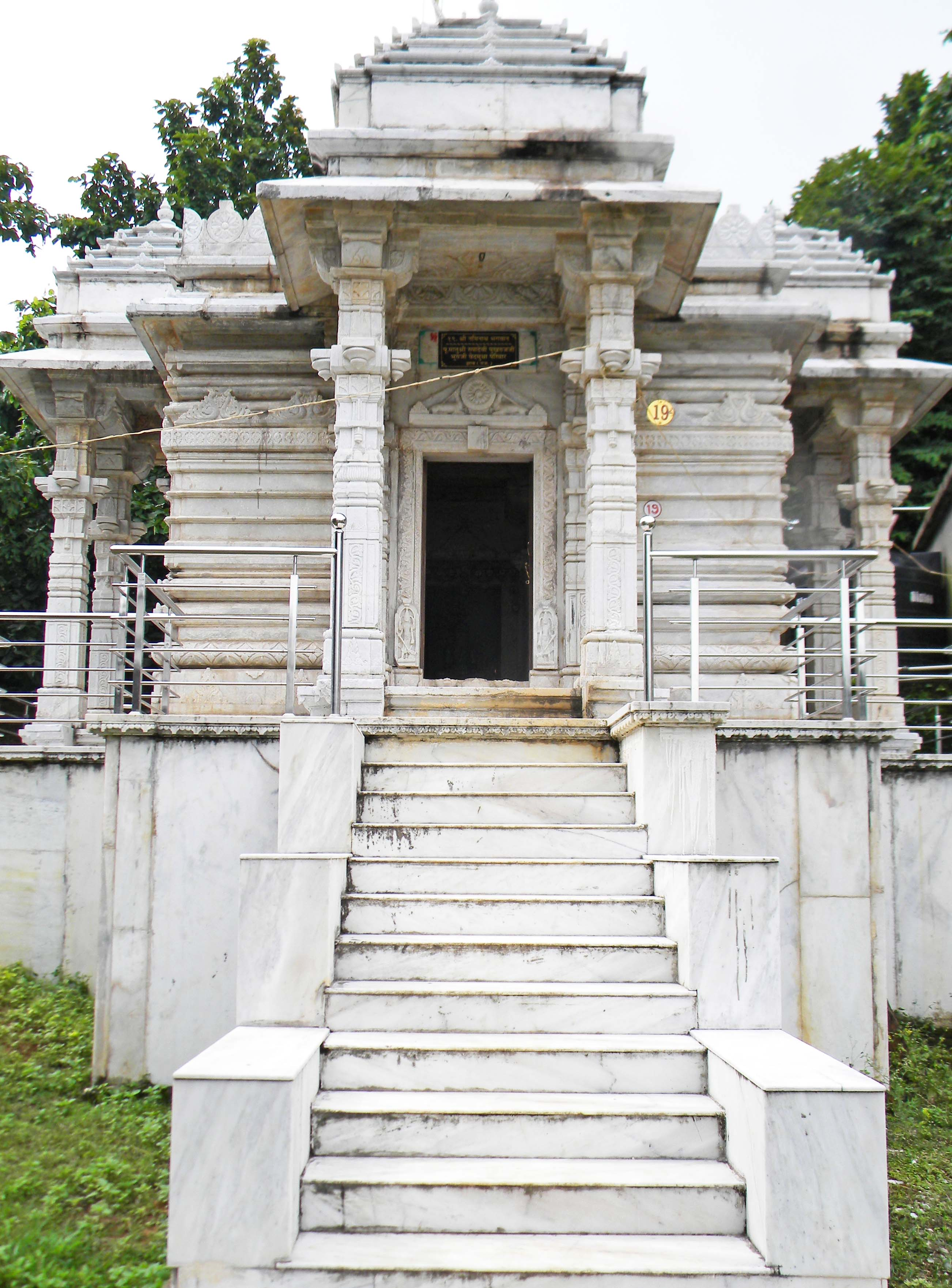
Naminatha temple in Madhuban, Jharkhand

=== Places of birth and liberation ===
Jain universal history identifies the ancient region of Mithila as the royal birthplace of Naminatha. According to the 14th-century Jain text Vividha Tirtha Kalpa, Mithila historically housed major temples dedicated to both Naminatha and Mallinatha. While original structures were lost over centuries, modern restoration efforts by Jain monastic orders in Sitamarhi, Bihar, have established the Mithilapuri Jain Teerth to preserve their ancient footprints and commemorate this geographic origin. For his liberation, Jain texts state he achieved moksha at Shikharji in Jharkhand. As the site of his ultimate liberation, Parasnath Hill features a specific structural shrine (tonk) enshrining the footprints (charan) of Naminatha, serving as a major pilgrimage destination for both the Digambara and Śvētāmbara sects.

=== Other temples ===
Naminatha Swami Temple is a 10th-century Digambara temple forms part of the Khajuraho Group of Monuments (a UNESCO World Heritage Site) built during the Chandela dynasty. While originally constructed as an Rishabhanatha shrine, it is deeply associated with Naminatha and features a rare blend of traditional Jain architecture with Vaishnavaite exterior elements.

Shri Naminath Temple, located within the UNESCO World Heritage Site of Jaisalmer Fort in Rajasthan, is prominent 15th-century Śvētāmbara temple. It is renowned for its intricate marble architecture and its primary deity (moolnayak) is a unique light-brown marble idol of Naminatha seated in the lotus position (padmasana).

== See also ==
- God in Jainism
- Arihant (Jainism)
