= Mithilapuri Jain Teerth =

Jain Teerth

- मिथिलापुरी जैन तीर्थ

Religion
- Affiliation: Jainism; Religious places
- Sect: Digambara and Shvetambara
- Deity: Mallinath and Naminath
- Festivals: Janma Kalyanaka, Tapa Kalyanaka

Location
- Location: Sursand and Dumra, Mithila
- Municipality: Sursand Nagar Panchayat and Sitamarhi Municipal Corporation

Mithilapuri Jain Teerth (Maithili: मिथिलापुरी जैन तीर्थ) is a sacred place in the tradition of Jainism. It is believed to be the birthplace and the penance place of the two Jain Tirthankars Bhagwan Mallinath Swami and Bhagwan Naminath Swami. According to the Digambara sect of Jainism, it is located at the Sursand town of Sitamarhi district in the Mithila region of Bihar. It is very close to the line of the Indo-Nepal International Border at the outskirts of the Sursand town. Similarly for the Śvetāmbara sect of Jainism, it is believed to be located at Dumra suburb in the city of Sitamarhi in the Mithila region.

== Description ==
In the tradition of Jainism, Mithila is considered as the sacred place where more than two tirthankars were born. In Jainism, there are two major sects Digambara and Shvetambara schools of thought. The location of the Mithilapuri Jain Teerth is believed to be at the two different locations Sursand and Dumra in the Sitamarhi district of the Mithila region by the two sects Digambara and Shvetambara respectively.

=== Shree Mithilapuri Digambara Jain Teerth, Sursand ===
According to Digambara sect of Jainism, the location of Mithilapuri Jain Teerth at Sursand town in the Mithila region is considered as the birthplace of the two tirthankars Mallinath and Naminath. Every year on the occasions of the birth anniversaries of the two tirthankars grand festivals known as Janma Kalyanaka are organised at this place. In the festivals of Janma Kalyanaka, the Jain devotees from different parts of the Indian subcontinent gather here and take part in the ceremonies of the birth anniversaries of the tirthankars. This Teerth is governed by the Bihar State Digambara Jain Teerth Kshetra Committee.

=== Jain Shvetambara Kalyanaka Teerth Nyasa, Dumra ===
The Mithilapuri Jain Teerth at Dumra is managed by the Shvetambara sect of Jainism. The management of the Teerth is governed by the trust called as Jain Shvetambara Kalyanaka Teerth Nyasa. According to Pandit Shekhar Kumar Pandey, a Jain follower Harkhchandji Nahta from Bikaner in Rajasthan wished to discover the disconnected shrine in Jainism. Then his son Lalit Kumar Nahta started the search to fulfill his father's dream in 1993. Finally he discovered Mithilapuri Jain Teerth at Dumra suburb of Sitamarhi city. After getting the proof of the Teerth he registered Jain Shvetambara Kalyanaka Tirtha Nyasa on 24 May 2006. Then it was decided to construct a Jain temple at Dumra suburb in the city of Sitamarhi. After that the construction of the temple started in 2014 on the land donated by the local resident Rukmini Devi.
