= Munisuvrata =

20th Tirthankara of Jainism, in current cycle of Jain cosmology

- 20th Tirthankara
- Member of Tirthankara, Shalakapurusha, Arihant and Siddha
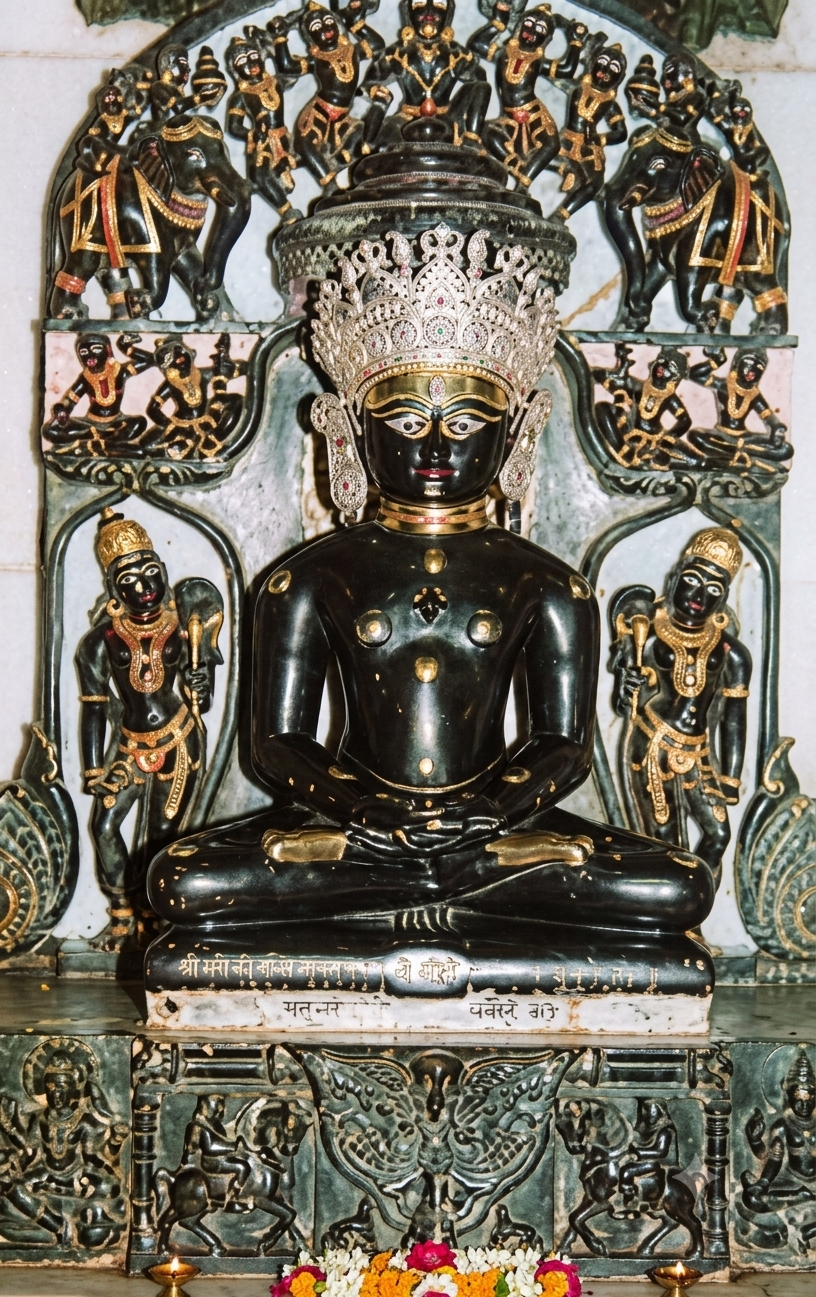
- 12th Century Idol of Munisuvrata at Samdi Vihara Temple, Bharuch, Gujarat
- Venerated in: Jainism
- Predecessor: Mallinatha
- Successor: Naminatha
- Symbol: Tortoise
- Height: 20 dhanusha
- Age: 30,000
- Color: Black
- Gender: Male

Genealogy
- Born: Rajgir
- Died: Sammed Shikhar
- Parents: Sumitra (father); Padmāvatī (mother)
- Dynasty: Harivaṁśa

Munisuvrata or Munisuvratanatha (IAST: Munisuvratanātha) (Devanagari: मुनिसुव्रतनाथ) (Sanskrit: मुनिसुव्रतः) was the twentieth Tirthankara of the present half time cycle (avasarpini) in Jain cosmology. He became a siddha, a liberated soul which has destroyed all of his karma. Events of the Jaina version of Ramayana are placed at the time of Munisuvrata. Munisuvrata lived for over 30,000 years. His chief apostle (gaṇadhara) was sage Malli Svāmi.

== Legends ==
Munisuvrata was the twentieth tirthankara of the present half time cycle (avasarpini) in Jain cosmology. Jain texts like padmapurana place him as a contemporary of Rama. According to Jain texts, Munisuvrata was born as 54 lakh years passed after the birth of the nineteenth tirthankara, Mallinātha. According to Jain beliefs, Munisuvrata descended from the heaven called Ānata kalpa on the twelfth day of the bright half of the month of Āśvina – āśvina śukla dvādaśi– to queen Padmavati and king Sumitra. On the third day of Shraavana (month) Krishna (dark fortnight) according to Hindu calendar, queen Padmavati of Rajgir saw fourteen auspicious dreams. When she shared her dreams with her husband, king Sumitra of the Harivamsa clan, he explained that a tirthankara will be born to them soon. Then, Munisuvrata was born to them on the fifteenth day of the Shraavana Shukla (bright fortnight) in 1,184,980 BC. His height is mentioned to be 20 dhanusha (60 metres) and complexion as a dark one.

According to Jain texts, after spending 7,500 years as a youth, Munisuvrata is believed to have ruled his kingdom for 15,000 years (rājyakāla). He then renounced all worldly pursuits and became a monk. According to Jain beliefs, he spent 11 months performing karma-destroying austerities and then attained the all-embracing knowledge – Omniscience (kevala jñāna) under a Champaka tree. He is said to have 18 ganadharas headed by Malli. Puspavati or Puspadatta is believed to be the head-nun of his order. Samayavayanga sutra, however, names Kumbha and Amila as the head ganadhara and head nun respectively.

Munisuvrata is said to have lived for over 30,000 years and attained liberation (nirvāña) from Sammeda śikhara on the twelfth day of the dark half of the month of phālguna – phālguna kṛṣna dvādaśi. Varuna is mentioned to be his yaksha and his yakhsini is named Bahurupini in Digambara tradition and Naradatta in Śvetāmbara tradition.

Munisuvrata's successor, Naminatha, is said to have been born 9 lakh years after him.

Munisuvrata finds mentions in Jain texts like Uttarapurana and Tiloyapannati.

== Adoration ==
Svayambhustotra by Acharya Samantabhadra is the adoration of twenty-four tirthankaras. Its five slokas (aphorisms) adore the qualities of Munisuvrata.

O Lord Munisuvratanātha! You had attained the excellent observance of the vows of the sages; you are the ascetic supreme, and utterly pristine (having destroyed the inimical karmas). You stood out in the assembly of the sages like the moon in the midst of the constellations of stars.

— Svayambhūstotra (20-1-111)

An idol of Munisuvrata was installed in 127 AD or 157 AD in the Devanirmita stupa, Mathura.

== Iconography ==
Lord Munisuvratnath is the 20th Tirthankara of Jainism at Albert Museum, Jaipur, 10 th Century AD

Munisuvrata is usually depicted in a sitting (or standing) meditative pose, with a tortoise symbol beneath him; each tirthankara has a distinct emblem, which allows worshippers to distinguish similar idols. Jivantasvami represents Munisuvrata as a princely state. The Jina is represented as standing in the kayotsarga pose wearing crown and ornaments.

=== Ancient artifacts and idols ===
An early idol of Munisuvrata was historically installed in 127 CE or 157 CE at the Devanirmita stupa in Mathura. Archaeological evidence of his veneration was also recovered from the Akota Bronzes in Gujarat. Documented by scholar Umakant Premanand Shah, this excavation yielded a rare bronze idol depicting Munisuvrata in the Jivantasvami style. This artifact provides crucial physical evidence of his early medieval worship and the advanced metallurgical casting techniques of the period.

== Colossal statues ==
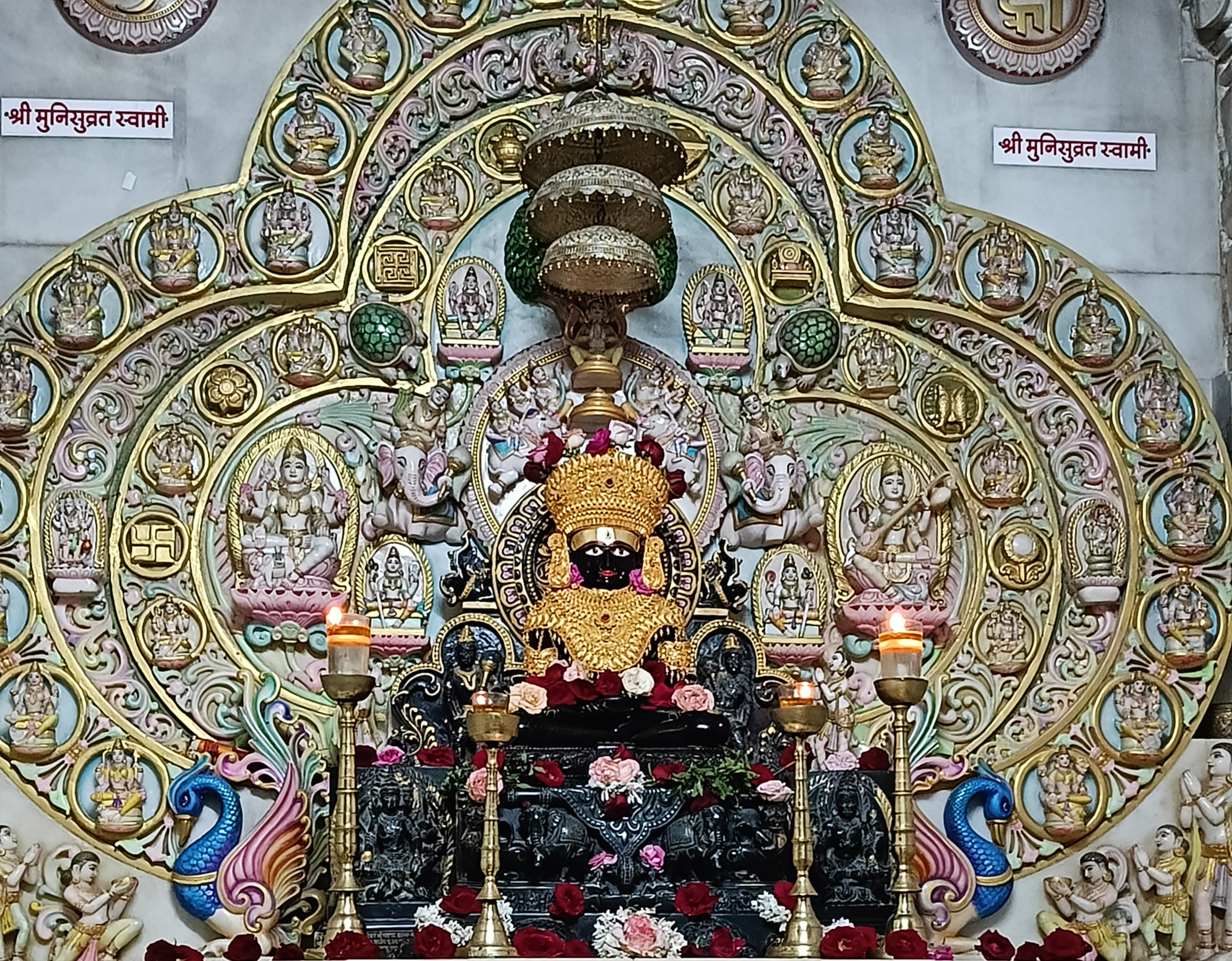
Idol of Munisuvrat at Aagashi Jain Temple, Virar, Maharashtra

Continuing the ancient Jain tradition of erecting massive monolithic monuments, Munisuvrata has also been the subject of several prominent modern structural tributes. A massive 54 feet (16 m) monolithic black stone statue of Munisuvrata, depicted in the standing meditation posture (kayotsarga), is installed at Jainaragutti near Adagur in Karnataka. Furthermore, a colossal 151 feet (46 m) monument known as the Statue of Purity is currently under construction in Bhora Kalan, Haryana. Upon its completion, it is slated to be one of the tallest modern Jain monuments in northern India. A 27 feet (8.2 m) idol of Munisuvrata is installed near the Shantinath Jain Teerth, Maharashtra.

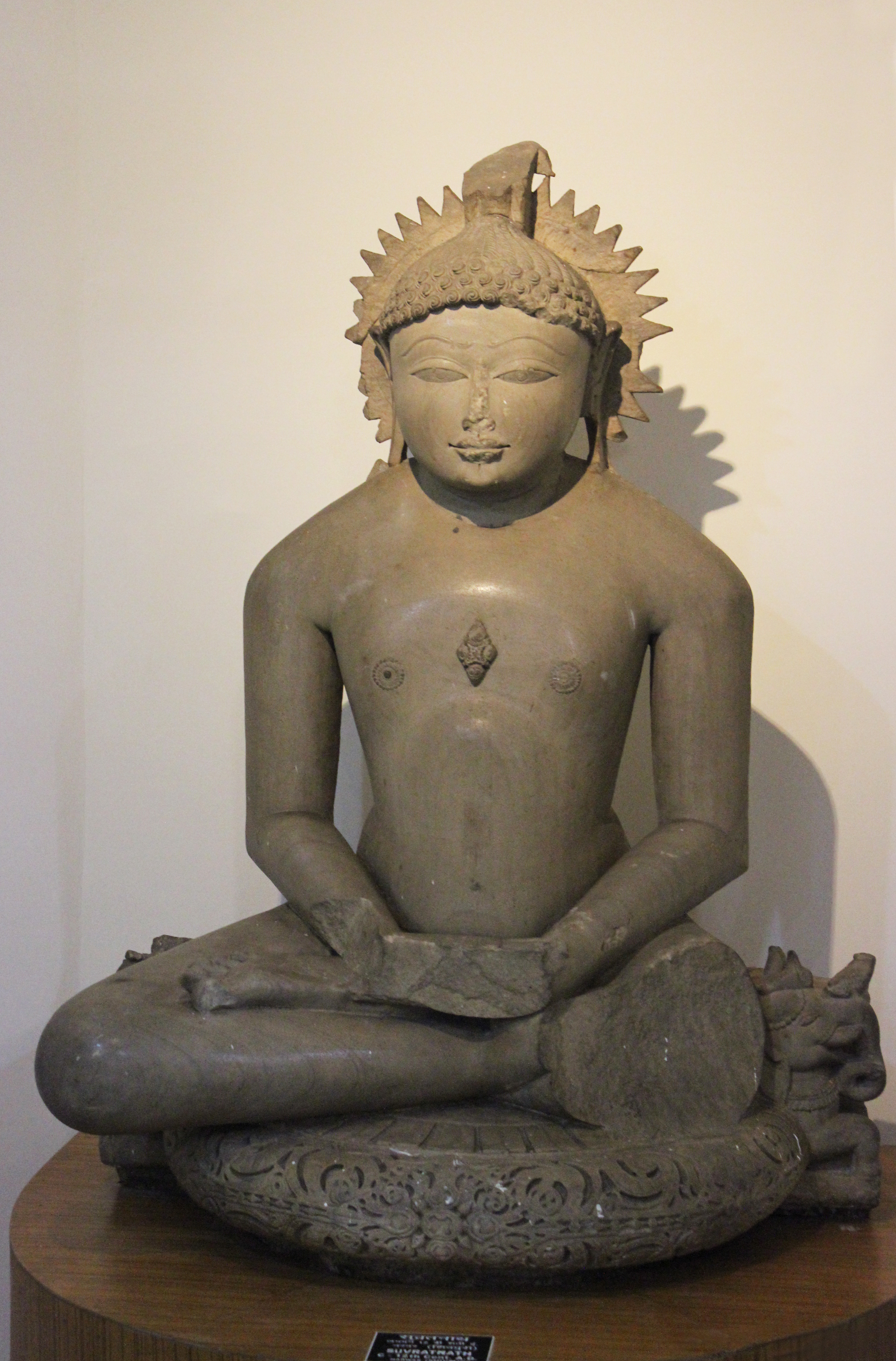
State Museum Bhopal, 6th century

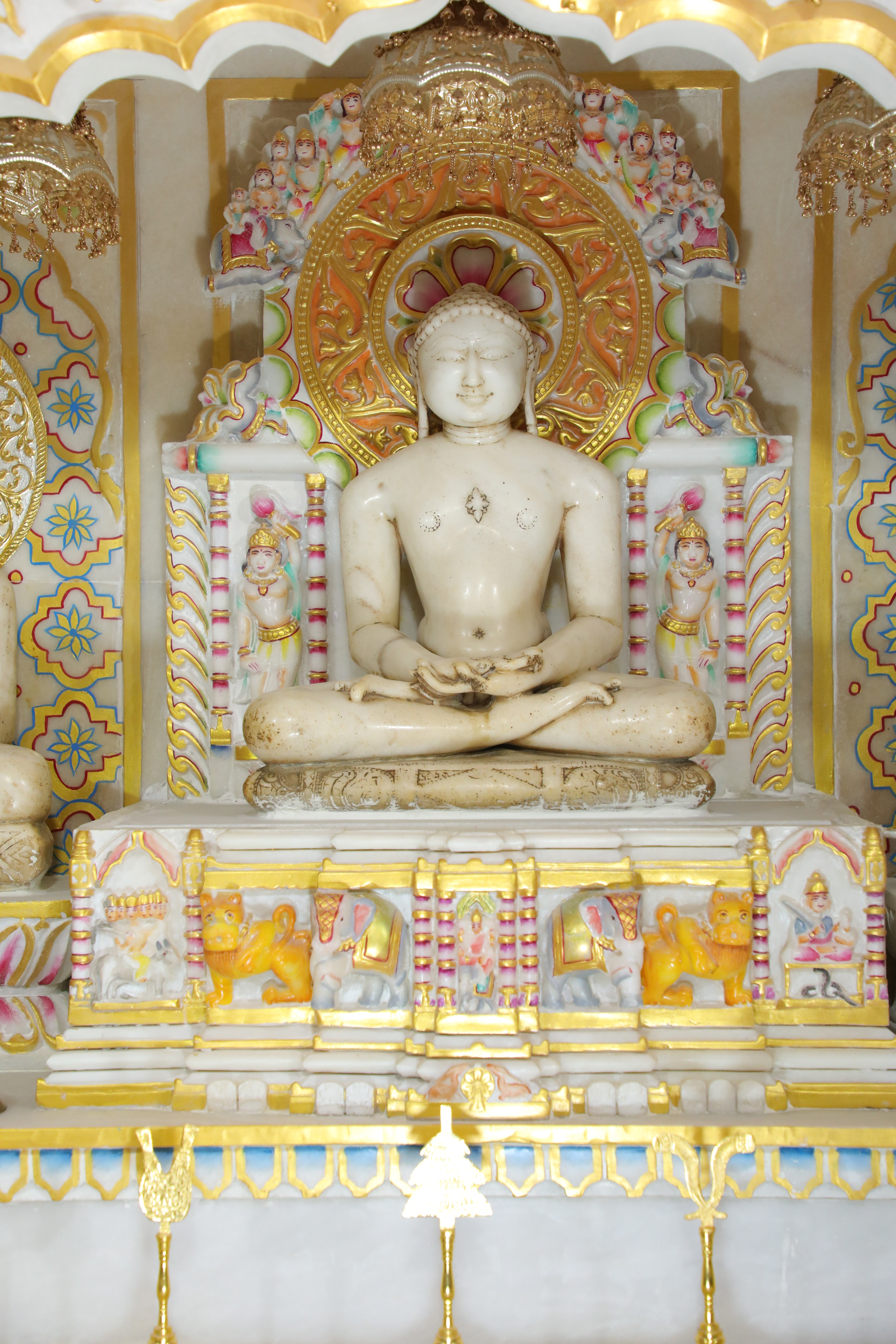
12th Century (1153 AD), hasteda, Rajasthan

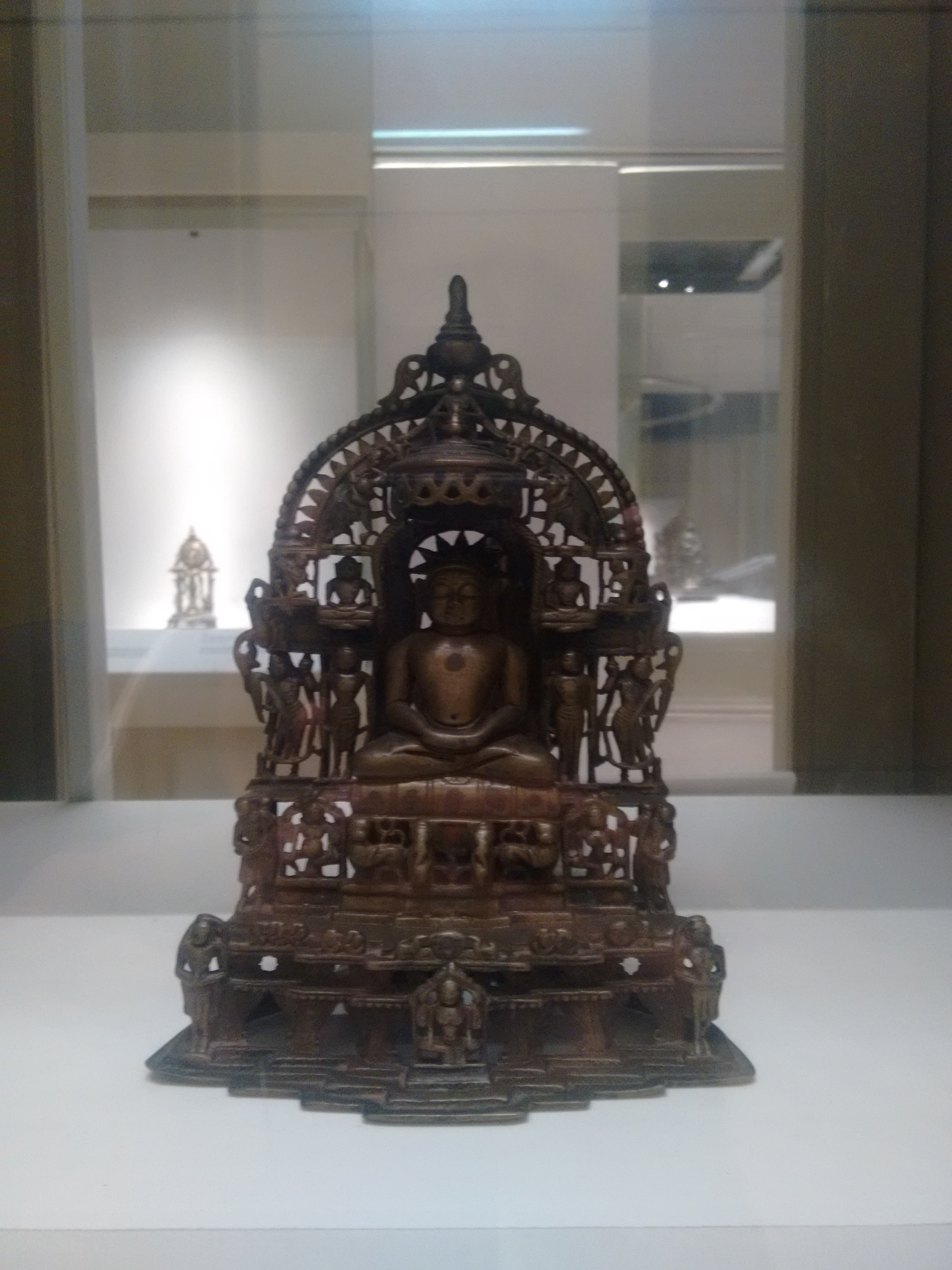
Munisuvrata, 1466 CE, Western India, National Museum, New Delhi

== Main Temples ==
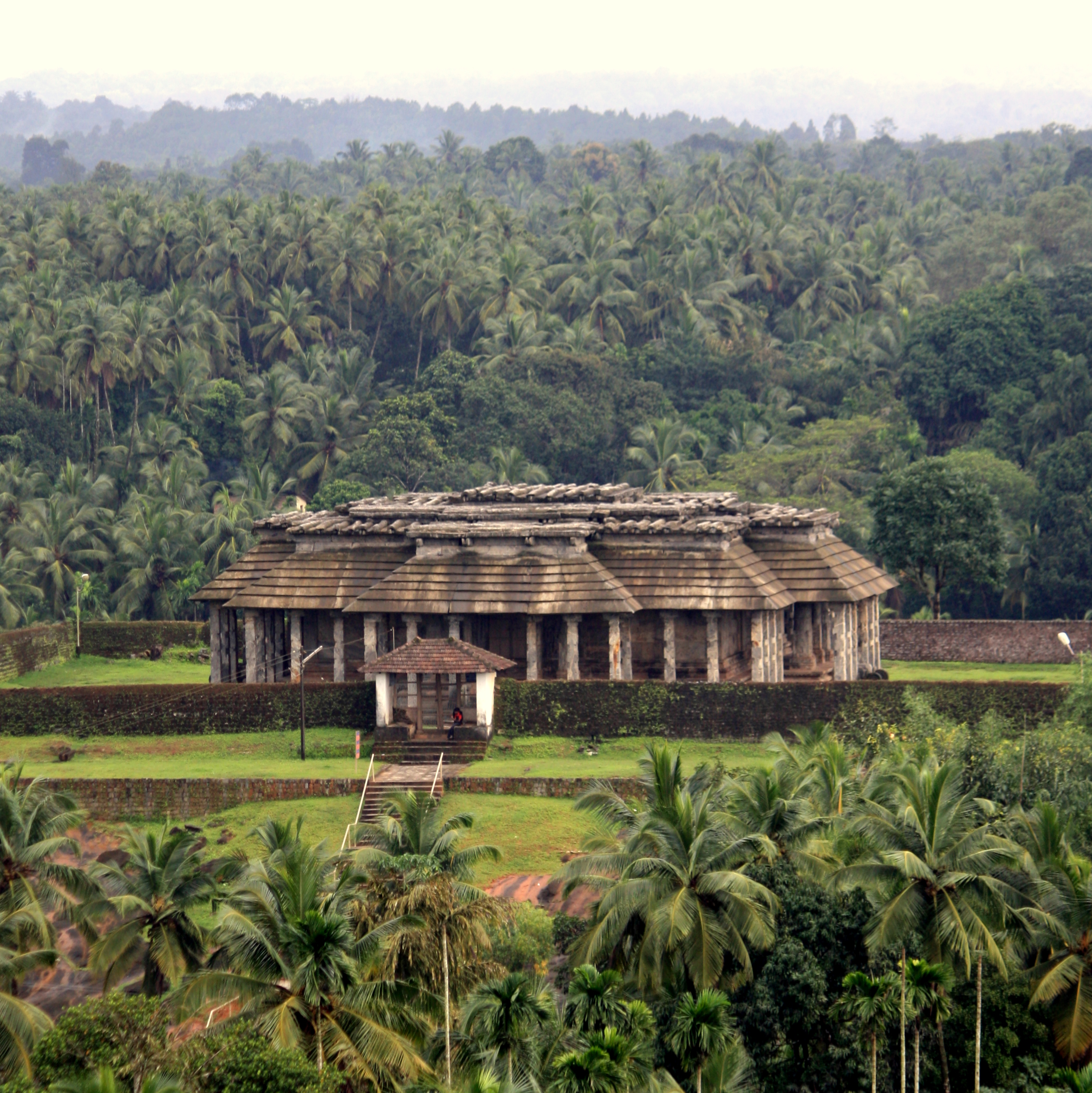
16th-century Chaturmukha Basadi in Karkala, Karnataka

Numerous temple complexes and monuments across India are dedicated to Munisuvrata, the 20th tirthankara.

=== Places of birth and liberation ===
The ancient city of Rajgir in Bihar, traditionally identified in Jain universal history as Munisuvrata's royal birthplace, serves as a primary center for his worship. Located at the foothills of the city, the Naulakha Mandir stands as a highly revered temple complex that prominently features a black-colored stone idol of the tirthankara as its principal deity. Additionally, historic Jain temple ruins dating to the 5th century on the nearby Vaibhara hill mark the continuous devotional reverence at his geographic birthplace.

Jain texts state that Munisuvrata attained liberation at Shikharji in Jharkhand. A structural shrine, known as a tonk, marks the site on the mountain where he is believed to have attained nirvana.

=== Other temples ===
In southern India, the Chaturmukha Basadi in Karkala, Karnataka, was constructed in 1586 CE. The stone temple features symmetrical, four-faced (chaturmukha) architecture and houses life-size idols of the tirthankaras Aranatha, Mallinatha, and Munisuvrata facing the four cardinal directions.

In western India, the Paithan Jain Tirth in Maharashtra is a Digambara pilgrimage site located on the banks of the Godavari River. Its principal deity is a black stone idol of Munisuvrata, which is associated with miraculous events in regional Jain folklore. Another site in Maharashtra is the Shantinath Jain Teerth located in Indapur.

In Rajasthan, dedicated sites include the underground Keshoraipatan Jain temple, the Shri Munisuvrata-Nemi-Parshva Jinalaya in Santhu, the Jain temple in Hasteda, Jaipur, and the Shri 1008 Munisuvratnath Digambar Jain Atishay Kshetra SwastiDham in Jahazpur.

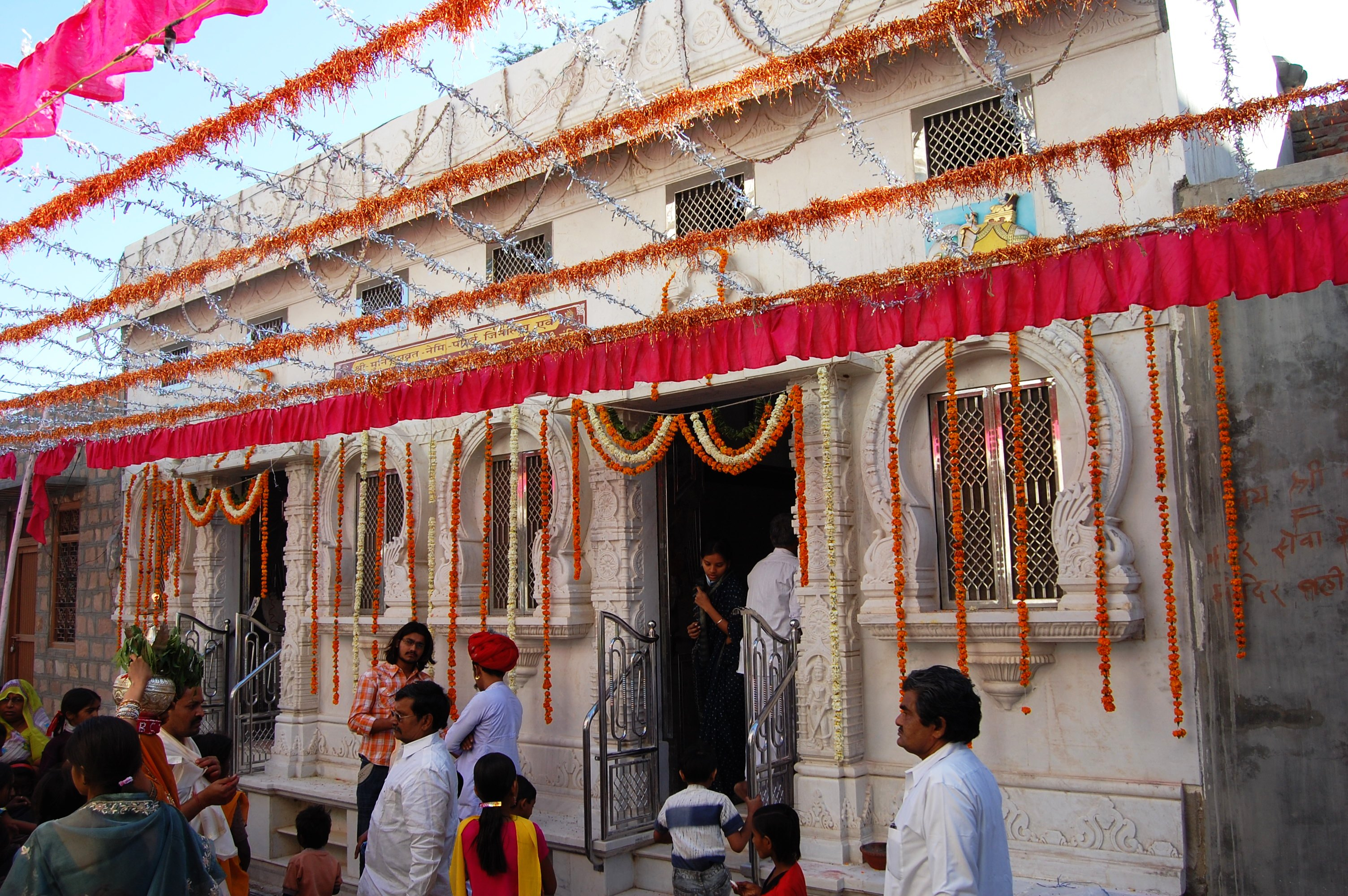
Shri Munisuvrata-Nemi-Parshva Jinalaya at Santhu

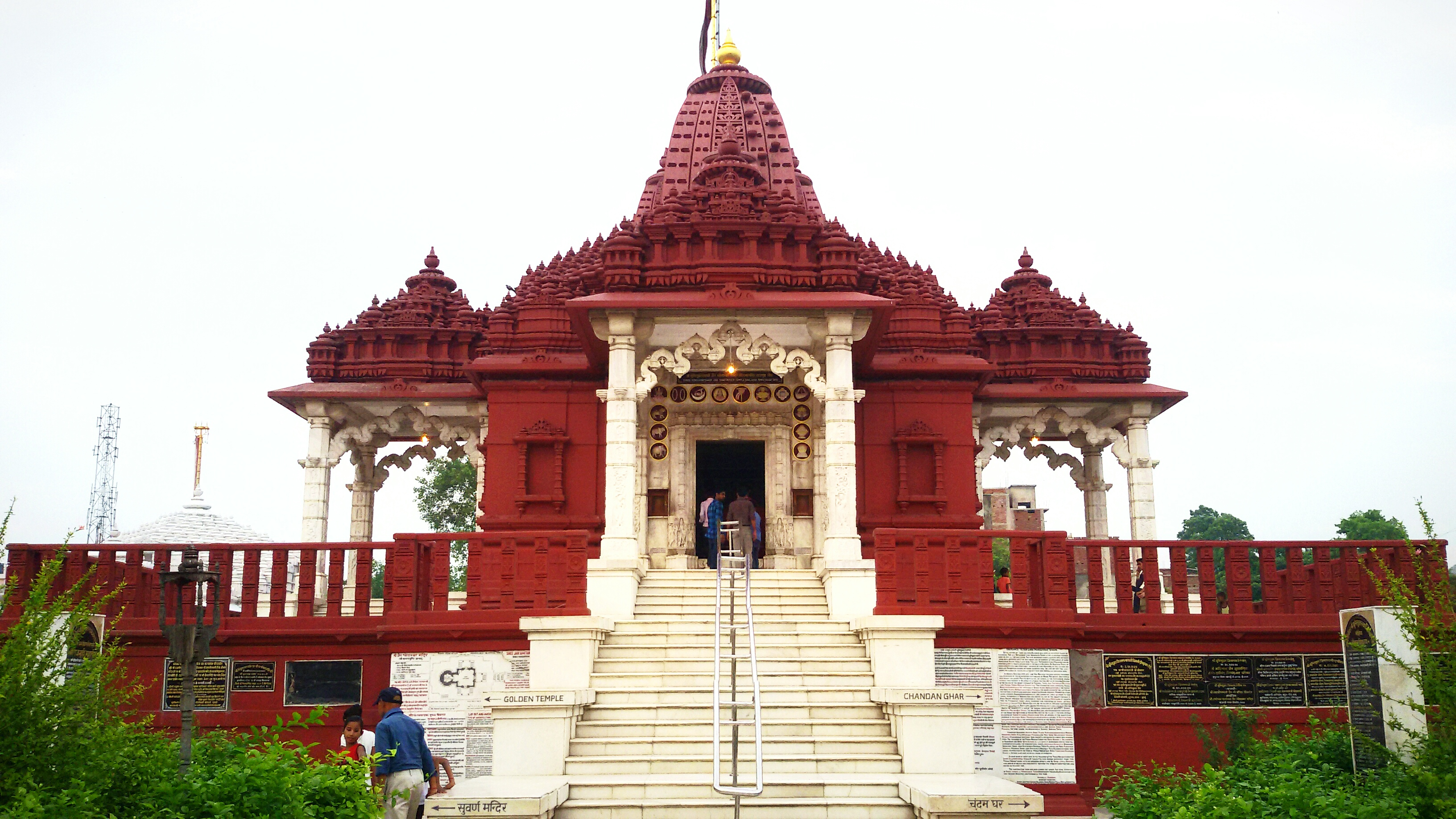
Naulakha Mandir, Rajgir

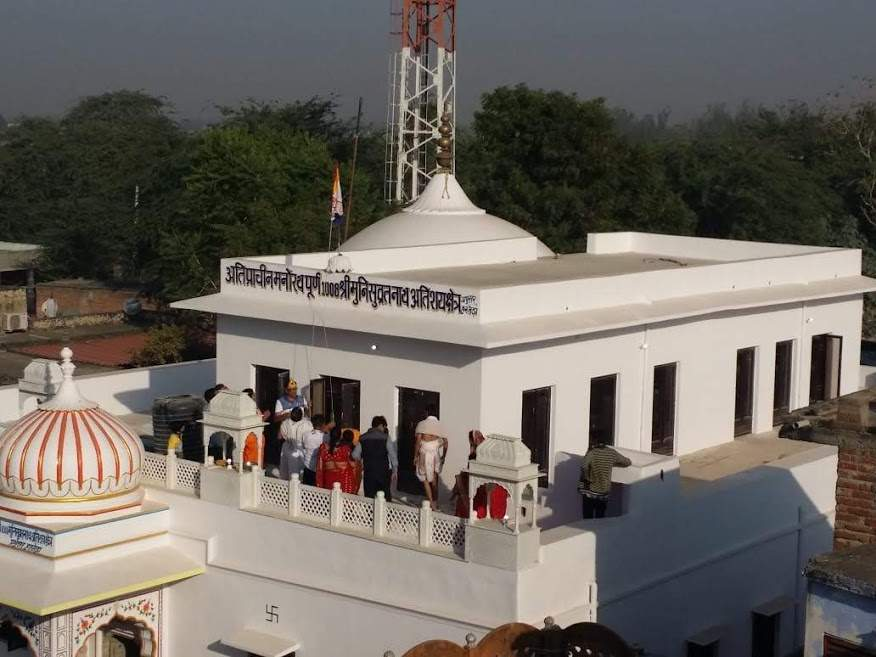
Hasteda, Jain temple

== See also ==
- God in Jainism
- Arihant (Jainism)
- Jainism and non-creationism
