= Jnatadharmakathah =

Information
- Religion: Jainism

Jnātadhārmakathāh is the sixth of the 12 Jain Angas said to be promulgated by Māhavīra himself. Jnātadhārmakathāh translated as "Stories of Knowledge and Righteousness" is said to have been composed by Ganadhara Sudharmaswami as per the Śvetāmbara tradition.

== Subject matter of the Agama ==
It contains a series of narratives, from which morals about results of following the religious path are drawn. The Eighth Chapter gives the story of Lady Mallinatha the nineteenth Tirthankara, or according to the Digambara Jain, Lord Mallinatha.

== English translations ==
Popular English Translations are :- Illustrated SRI JNATADHARMAKATHANGA SUTRA in 2 volumes Prakrit Gatha - Hindi exposition - English exposition and Appendices Ed. by Pravartaka Amar Muni, Shrichand Surana Saras, Eng. tr. by Surendra Bothra
