= Vasupujya =

12th Tirthankara of Jainism

- 12th Tirthankara
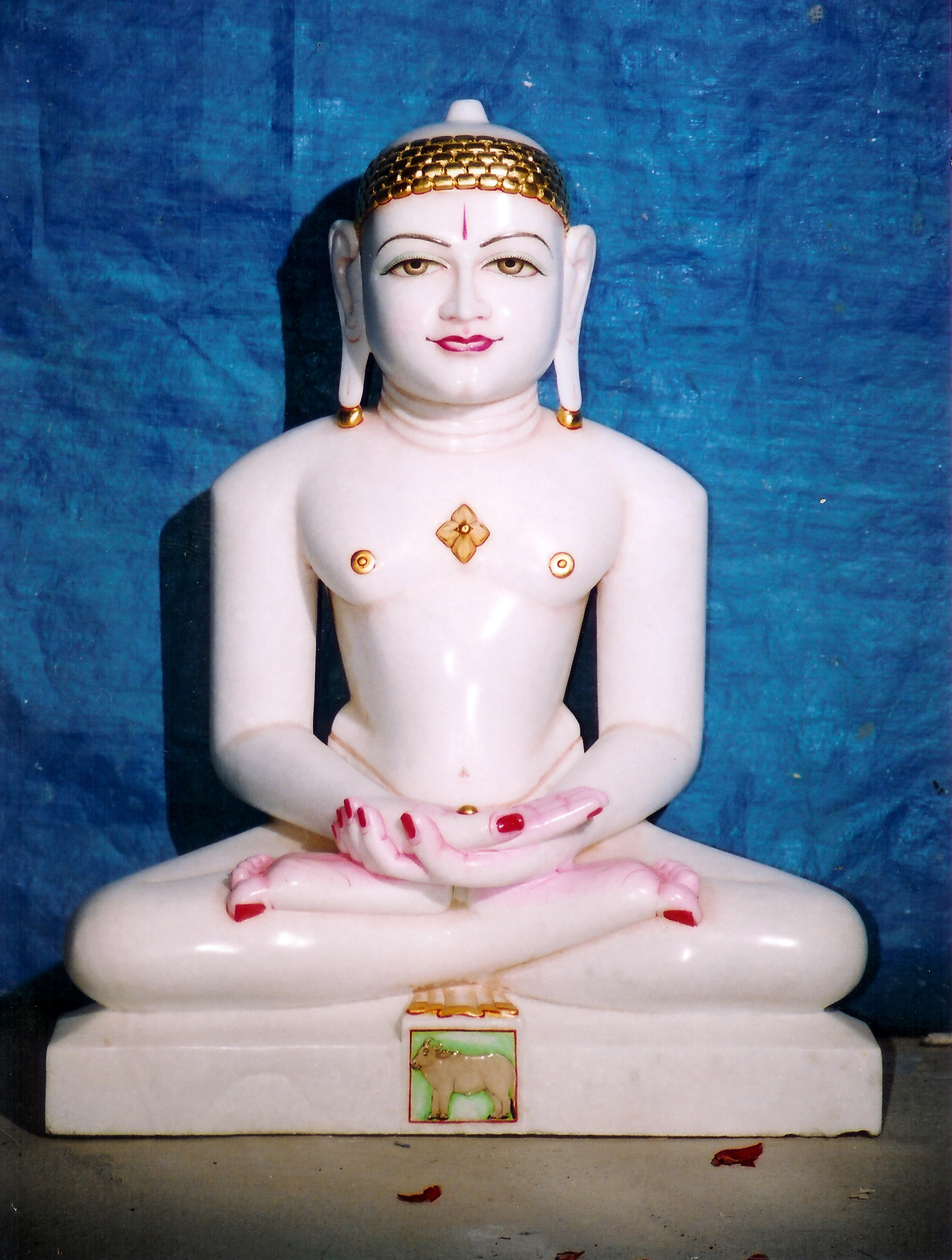
- Vasupujya Swami at Vataman
- Other names: Shri Vasupujya Swami Bhagwan
- Venerated in: Jainism
- Major cult centre: Champapuri
- Predecessor: Shreyansanatha
- Successor: Vimalanatha
- Symbol: Buffalo
- Height: 70 bows (210 metres)
- Age: 7,200,000 years
- Color: Red

Genealogy
- Born: Champapur
- Died: Champapur
- Parents: Vasupujya (father); Jaya (Vijaya) (mother)
- Dynasty: Ikṣvākuvaṁśa

Vasupujya is the twelfth tirthankara in Jainism of the avasarpini (present age). According to Jain beliefs, he became a siddha, a liberated soul which has destroyed all of its karma. Vasupujya was born to King Vasupujya and Queen Jaya Devi at Champapuri in the Ikshvaku dynasty. His birth date was the fourteenth day of the Falgun Krishna month of the Indian calendar. He never married and remained a celibate. He attained Kevala Jnana within one month of Tapsya and Moksha at Champapuri, of Bihar in India on the fourteenth day of the bright half of the month of Ashadh.

== Life and legends ==
According to Jain tradition, Vasupujya is venerated as the 12th tirthankara of the present cosmic age (avasarpini). Jain universal history states that he was born into the ancient Ikshvaku dynasty to King Vasupujya and Queen Jaya Devi in the city of Champapuri. Within the expansive framework of Jain cosmology, texts attribute to him a symbolic lifespan of 7,200,000 years and a towering physical height of 70 bows (dhanushas).

Vasupujya holds a highly unique theological distinction among the 24 tirthankaras; traditional accounts state that all five of his kalyanakas (auspicious life events: conception, birth, renunciation, omniscience, and ultimate liberation) occurred in the exact same geographic location of Champapuri. Following his period of asceticism and preaching, he attained liberation from the cycle of rebirth (moksha) at this site, making him one of the few tirthankaras who did not attain nirvana on Mount Shikharji. Furthermore, Jain narratives associate his era with the second Vasudeva, Dwiprishtaha, whose brother Shrivijay is believed to have joined Vasupujya's ascetic monastic order after conquering the Prativasudeva Tark.

Vasupujya is said to have been born 54 sagara after his predecessor, Shreyansanatha. His successor, Vimalanatha, is said to have been born 30 sagara after him.

== Iconography ==
In Jain art and sculpture, Vasupujya is traditionally depicted in a meditative posture and is distinguished by his striking red physical complexion. He is explicitly identified by his unique iconographic emblem, the water buffalo, which is typically carved or stamped onto the pedestal beneath his idols. As with all tirthankaras, he is depicted alongside his dedicated guardian deities (Shashan-devatas). According to both the Digambara and Śvētāmbara traditions, his accompanying male guardian deity (yaksha) is Kumara. However, sectarian traditions differ regarding his female guardian (yakshi), with the Digambara sect identifying her as Gandhari and the Śvētāmbara sect identifying her as Chanda.

== Temples and legacy ==
Due to his foundational status, Vasupujya is heavily venerated across the Indian subcontinent.

=== Places of birth and liberation ===
The ancient city of Champapuri, located in the modern Bhagalpur district of Bihar, serves as the primary geographic epicenter of his worship due to its exclusive association with his entire life cycle and ultimate liberation. This site remains a massive pan-Indian pilgrimage destination, further marked by the 2014 inauguration of a colossal 31 feet (9.4 m) monolithic statue of Vasupujya at the temple complex in Nathnagar, Bihar.

=== Other temples ===
Beyond his geographic origins, his worship has spread extensively with the Jain diaspora. In southern India, historically significant temples dedicated to him are located in Kerala, specifically the prominent Śvētāmbara Jain temple, Alleppey and Ernakulam, which serve as crucial cultural anchors for the regional mercantile community. Additionally, major modern temple complexes and memorials (Shri Atma Vallabh Jain Smarak) dedicated to his worship have been established in northern hubs like Ludhiana and Delhi.

== See also ==
- God in Jainism
- Arihant (Jainism)
- Jainism and non-creationism
