= Mallinatha =

19th tirthankara in Jainism

- 19th Tirthankara
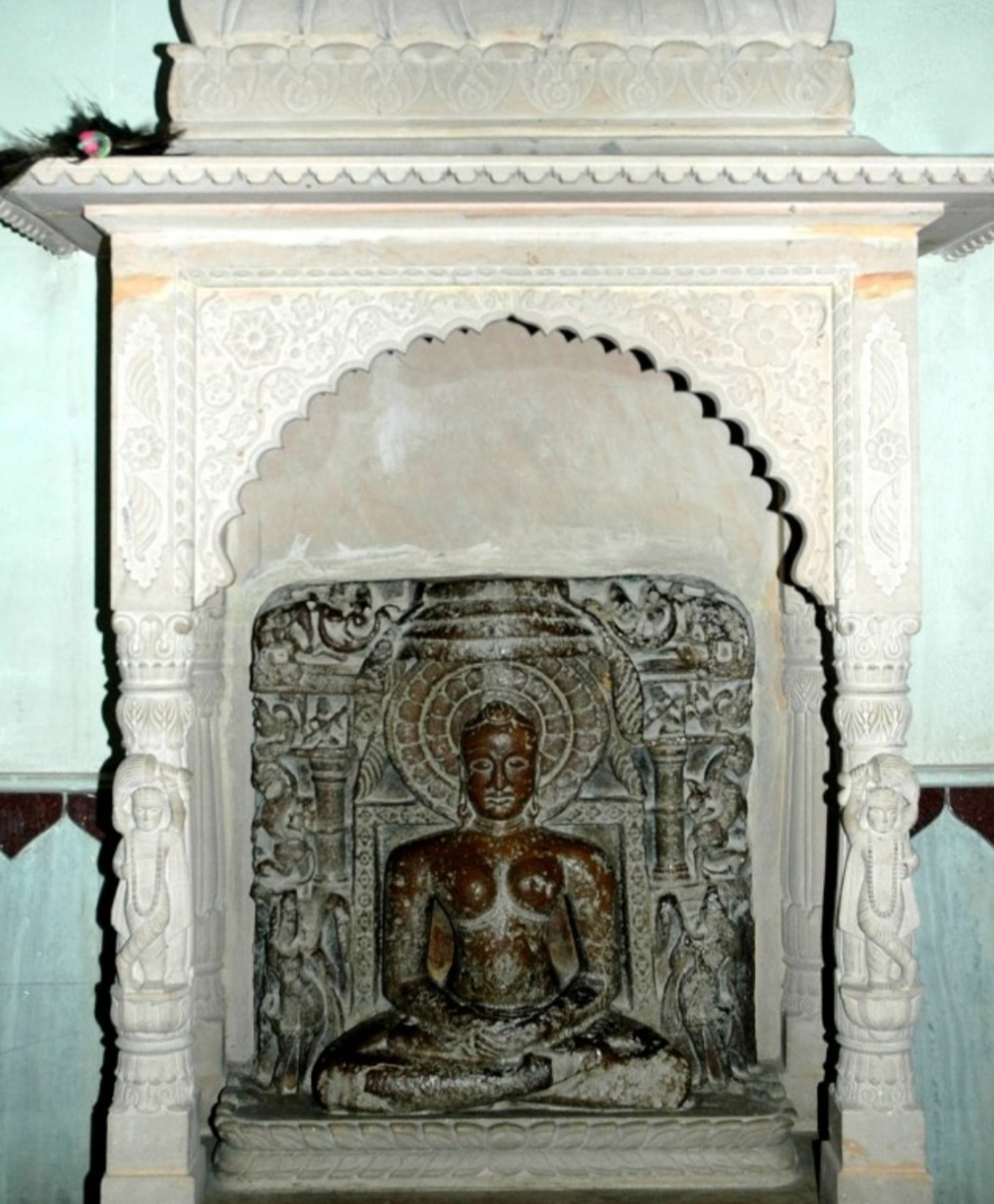
- Idol of Mallinatha in female form at Keshavrai Patan, Rajasthan
- Venerated in: Jainism
- Predecessor: Aranatha
- Successor: Munisuvrata
- Symbol: Water pitcher Kalasha
- Height: 25 dhanusha (75 meters)
- Age: 56,000
- Color: Blue
- Gender: Male (Digambara); Female (Śvētāmbara)

Genealogy
- Born: Mithilapuri Jain Teerth, Mithila
- Died: Shikharji
- Parents: Kumbha (father); Prajnavati (mother)
- Dynasty: Somavaṁśa—Ikṣvākuvaṁśa

Mallinatha (Prakrit: Mallinātha, Devanagari: मल्लिनाथ, Sanskrit: मल्लिनाथः, 'Lord of jasmine or seat') was the 19th ford-maker (tirthankara) of the present avasarpini age in Jainism. Jain texts indicate Mallinatha was born at Mithila into the Ikshvaku dynasty to King Kumbha and Queen Prajnavati. According to Jain beliefs, Mallinatha became a siddha, a liberated soul, at Shikharji, Jharkhand. The gender of Mallinatha is a point of theological division between the two major Jain sects. The Digambara tradition asserts that female biology and societal restrictions prevent the attainment of the final stages of spiritual purity, and depicts Mallinatha as a male. The Śvētāmbara tradition states that Mallinatha was a female named Mallivati. Temples dedicated to this tirthankara are located across the Indian subcontinent. In conventional iconography, Mallinatha is associated with a blue physical complexion and a water pitcher (kalasha) emblem.

== In Jain history ==
Jain texts indicate Mālliṇātha was born at Mithila into the Ikshvaku dynasty to King Kumbha and Queen Prajnavati. Their height is mentioned as 25 dhanusha. Tīrthaṅkara Māllīnātha lived for over 56,000 years, out of which 54,800 years less six days, was with omniscience (Kevala Jnana). They were said to have lived for 55,000 years by other authors.

Mallinatha is believed to be a woman named Malli Devi by Śvētāmbara Jains while the Digambara sect believes all 24 tirthankara to be men including Māllīnātha. Digambara tradition believes a woman can reach to the 16th heaven and can attain liberation only being reborn as a man. Digambara tradition says Mallinatha was a son born in a royal family, and worships Mallinatha as a male. However, the Shvetambara tradition of Jainism states that Māllīnātha was female with a name Mallivati.

According to Jain beliefs, Mālliṇātha became a siddha, a liberated soul which has destroyed all of its karma.

Mallinatha is said to have been born 1,000 crore less 6,584,000 years after their predecessor, Aranatha. Their successor, Munisuvrata, is said to have been born 54 lakh years after them.

== Sectarian dispute on gender ==
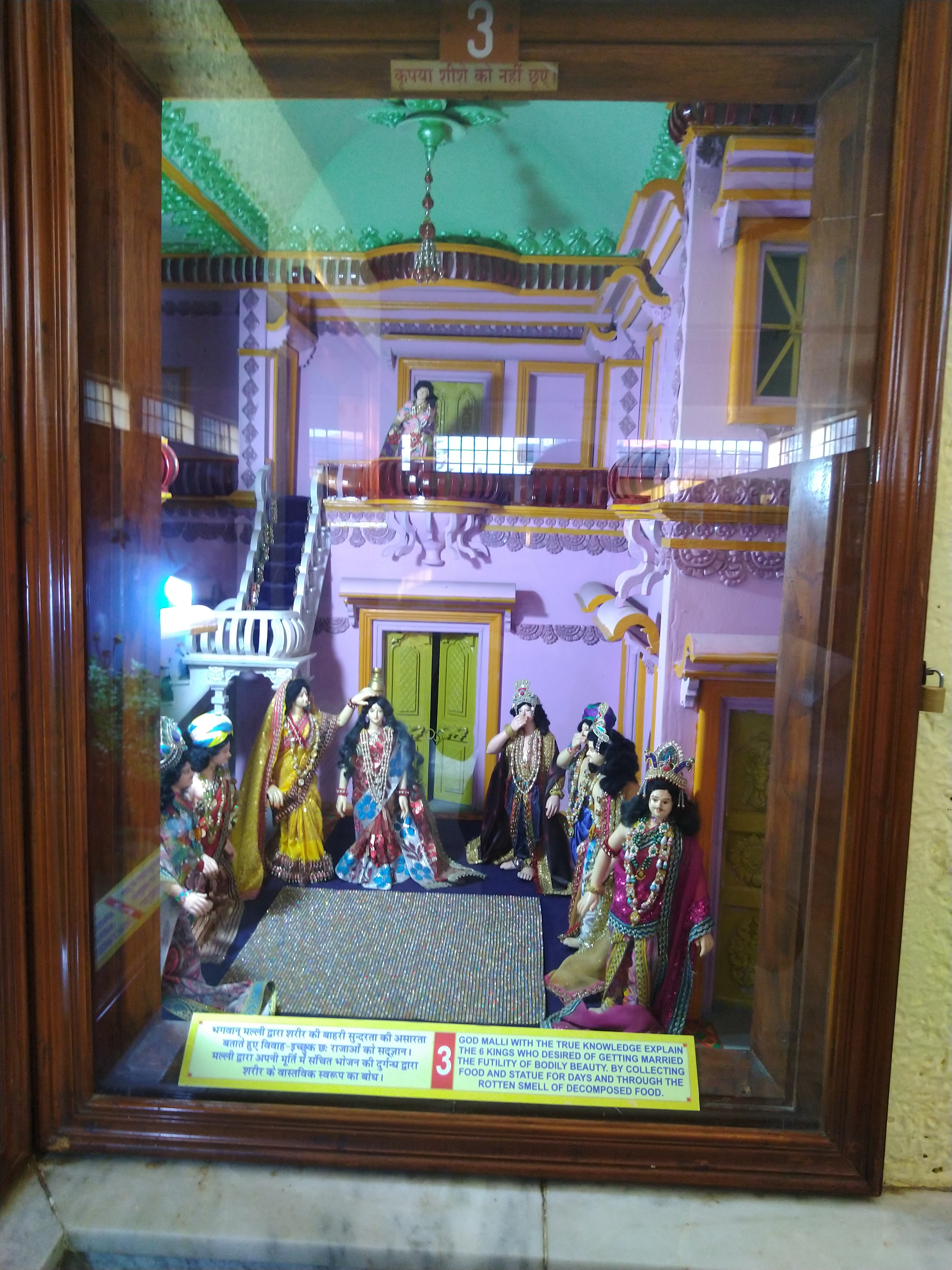
A diorama in Jain Museum of Madhuban, Giridih depicting Mallinatha teaching six kings the futility of bodily beauty, as per Swetambara tradition.

The gender of Malli one of the most fundamental theological divisions between the two major Jain sects. The Śvētāmbara tradition firmly maintains that Mallinatha was a woman named Mallī. According to Śvētāmbara texts, in a previous incarnation as a king named Mahabali, Mallinatha engaged in deceit (maya) by secretly outperforming friends in ascetic fasting. This karmic deceit resulted in rebirth with female physiology (stri-veda), while the simultaneous accumulation of immense spiritual merit (tirthankara-nama-karma) resulted in the destiny of a tirthankara. The Śvētāmbara sect heavily utilizes this narrative to assert that women are fully capable of attaining ultimate spiritual liberation (moksha).

Conversely, the Digambara tradition vehemently rejects this narrative, asserting that Mallinatha was male. Digambara theology dictates that complete non-attachment (aparigraha) requires absolute monastic nudity, a practice strictly prohibited for women in traditional Jain monastic codes. Consequently, Digambara scholars argue that female biology and societal restrictions inherently prevent the attainment of the final stages of spiritual purity, making a female tirthankara an ontological impossibility. Therefore, Digambara texts, universal histories, and iconography consistently depict Mallinatha as a male figure.

== Literature ==
The life and sectarian debates surrounding Mallinatha are documented across classical Jain literature and academic analyses. The Jnatrdharmakathah, a text of the Śvētāmbara canon, contains the narrative of Mallinatha; traditional accounts attribute its composition to Ganadhara Sudharmaswami. The Trishashti Shalaka Purusha Caritra, a universal history of the Śvētāmbara sect, dedicates Book 6.6 to the Mallinathacaritra. In Kannada literature, Nagachandra composed the Mallinathapurana in 1105 CE, detailing the tirthankara's life according to Digambara traditions. Theological debates regarding Mallinatha's gender and the spiritual liberation of women are recorded in sectarian texts, which have been compiled and translated by scholars such as Padmanabh S. Jaini.

== Iconography ==
Mallinatha is conventionally depicted in a sitting or standing meditative posture. The distinguishing emblem of this tirthankara is a water pitcher (kalasha), which allows worshippers to identify the idol. In traditional Jain descriptions, Mallinatha is associated with a blue physical complexion. Due to the fundamental sectarian dispute regarding Mallinatha's gender, Digambara iconography consistently depicts the tirthankara as a male figure. Conversely, the Śvētāmbara tradition recognizes Mallinatha as a woman named Malli or Mallivati.

=== Ancient artifacts and idols ===
Archaeological excavations of the Hansi hoard from the Asigarh Fort in Haryana yielded 58 bronze idols, prominently featuring depictions of Mallinatha. Dating to the 8th and 9th centuries CE, these specific artifacts demonstrate the active veneration of these tirthankaras before the collection was hastily buried to protect it from Ghaznavid invasions. The inclusion of these bronzes within the hoard provides critical evidence of their localized worship in early medieval northern India.

== Main temples ==
Mallinatha is highly venerated by both major Jain traditions, resulting in the construction of numerous historically and architecturally significant temple complexes across the Indian subcontinent.

=== Sites of birth and liberation ===
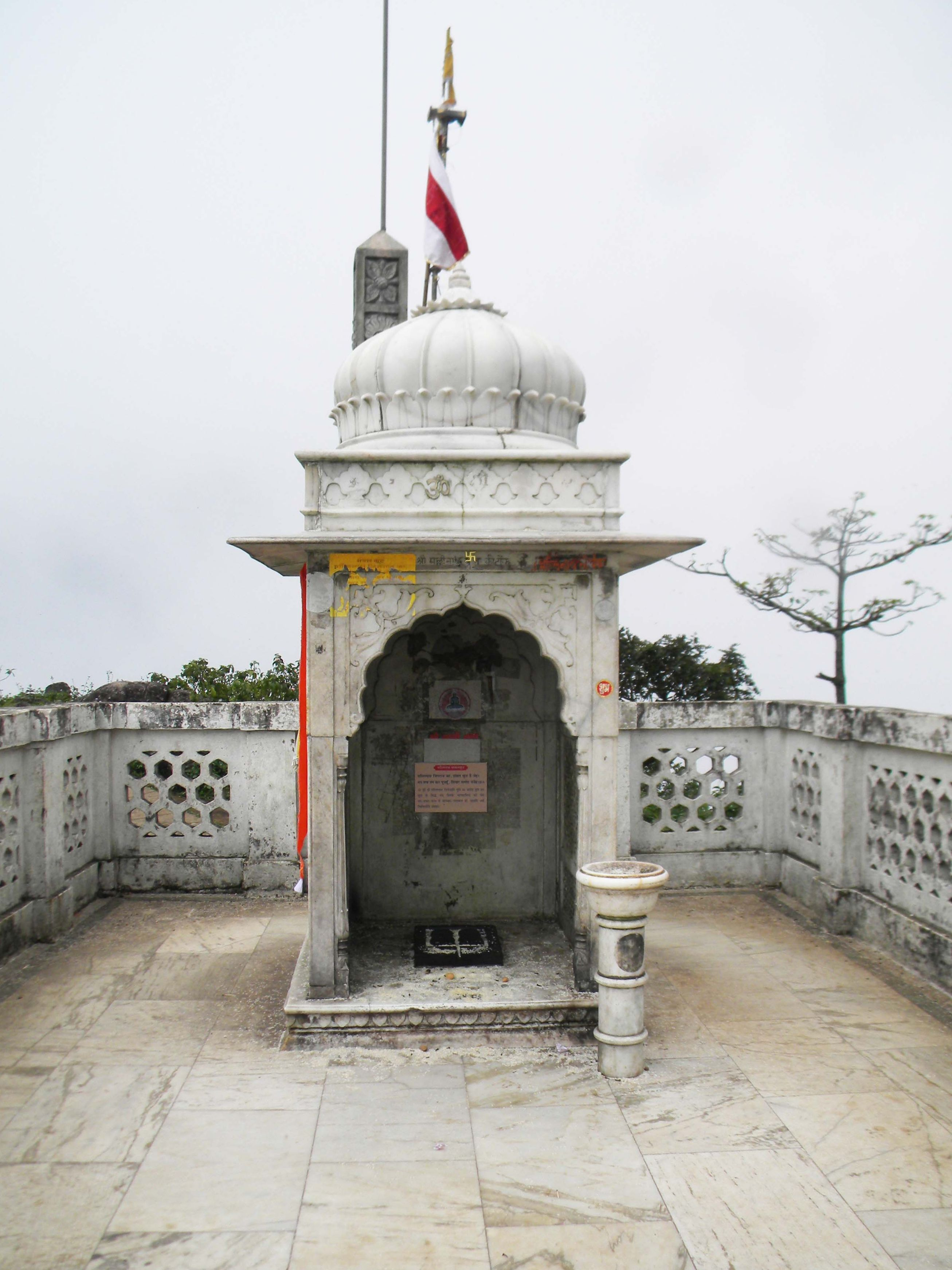
Mallinath Tonk on Shikharji from where Mallinatha attained Nirvana

The ancient city of Mithila is identified in Jain universal history as the royal birthplace of Mallinatha. The Mithilapuri Jain Teerth, located in the modern-day Sitamarhi district of Bihar, is a structural temple complex constructed to commemorate this specific geographical association. According to Jain texts, Mallinatha became a siddha, a fully liberated soul that has destroyed all of its karma, at Shikharji in Jharkhand. A dedicated structural shrine, known as the Mallinath tonk, marks the exact location on the mountain where the tirthankara is believed to have attained nirvana.

=== Other temples ===
In South India, the Mannargudi Mallinatha Swamy Jain Temple in Tamil Nadu stands as one of the most prominent historical shrines dedicated to this specific tirthankara. Constructed during the era of the Chola Empire, this ancient temple features classic Dravidian architecture and serves as a crucial religious center for the regional Tamil Jain community. Further west in Karnataka, the Chaturmukha Basadi in Karkala is a renowned late 16th-century stone monument. Completed in 1586 CE, this symmetrical, four-faced temple prominently enshrines life-size idols of Mallinatha alongside the tirthankaras Aranatha and Munisuvrata, facing all four cardinal directions.

In western India, the Shri Mallinath Jain Derasar located in Bhoyani, Gujarat, operates as a major regional pilgrimage center, particularly for the Śvētāmbara sect. This temple complex houses a highly revered white marble idol of Mallinatha seated in the traditional lotus position (padmasana). According to regional historical records, this primary deity was discovered submerged in a well during the mid-19th century, prompting the immediate construction of the surrounding temple infrastructure to accommodate visiting pilgrims.

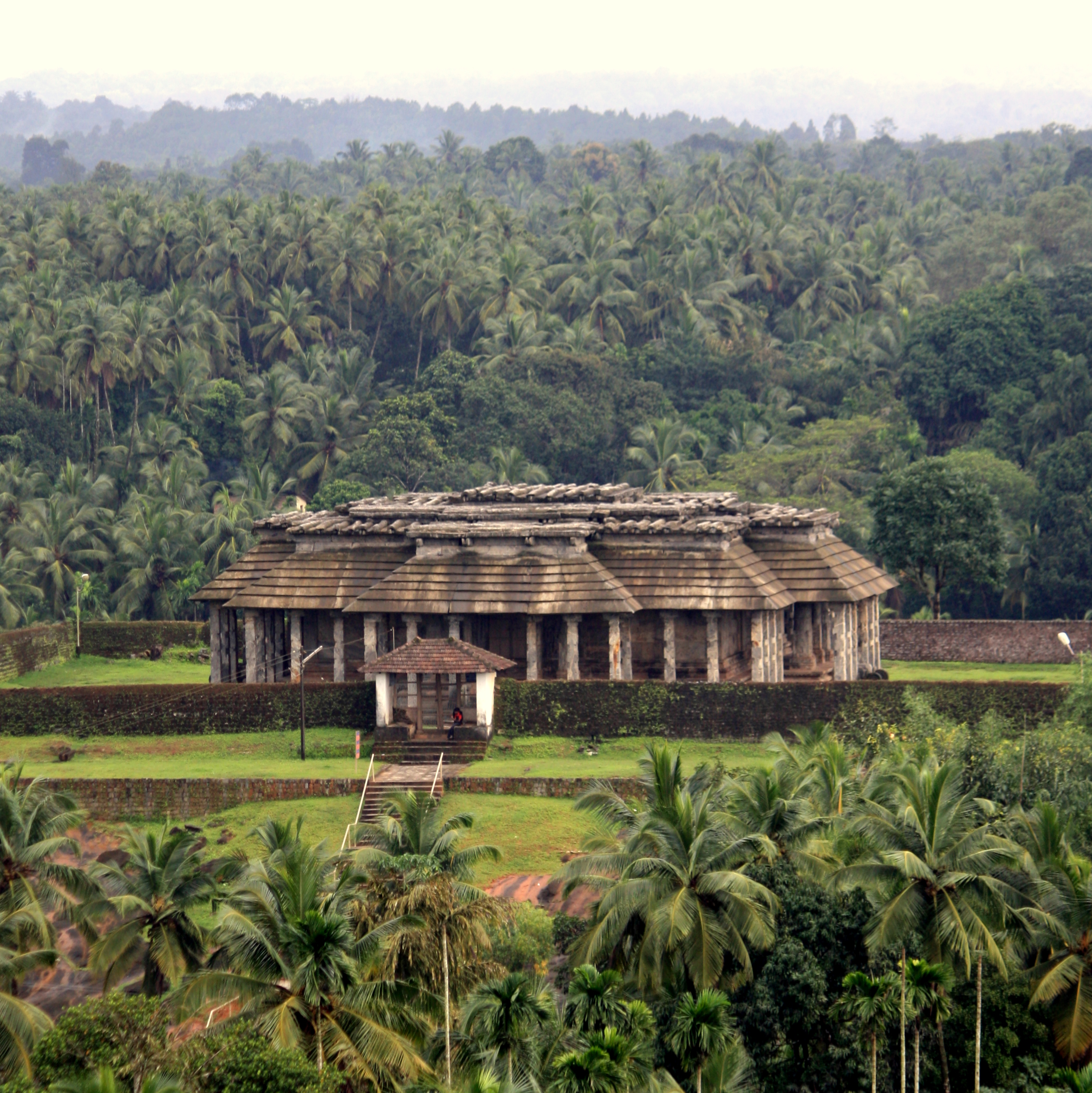
Chaturmukha Basadi

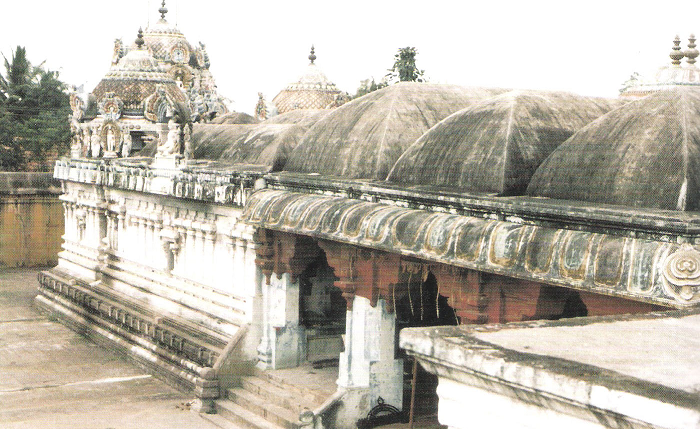
Mannargudi Mallinatha Swamy Temple

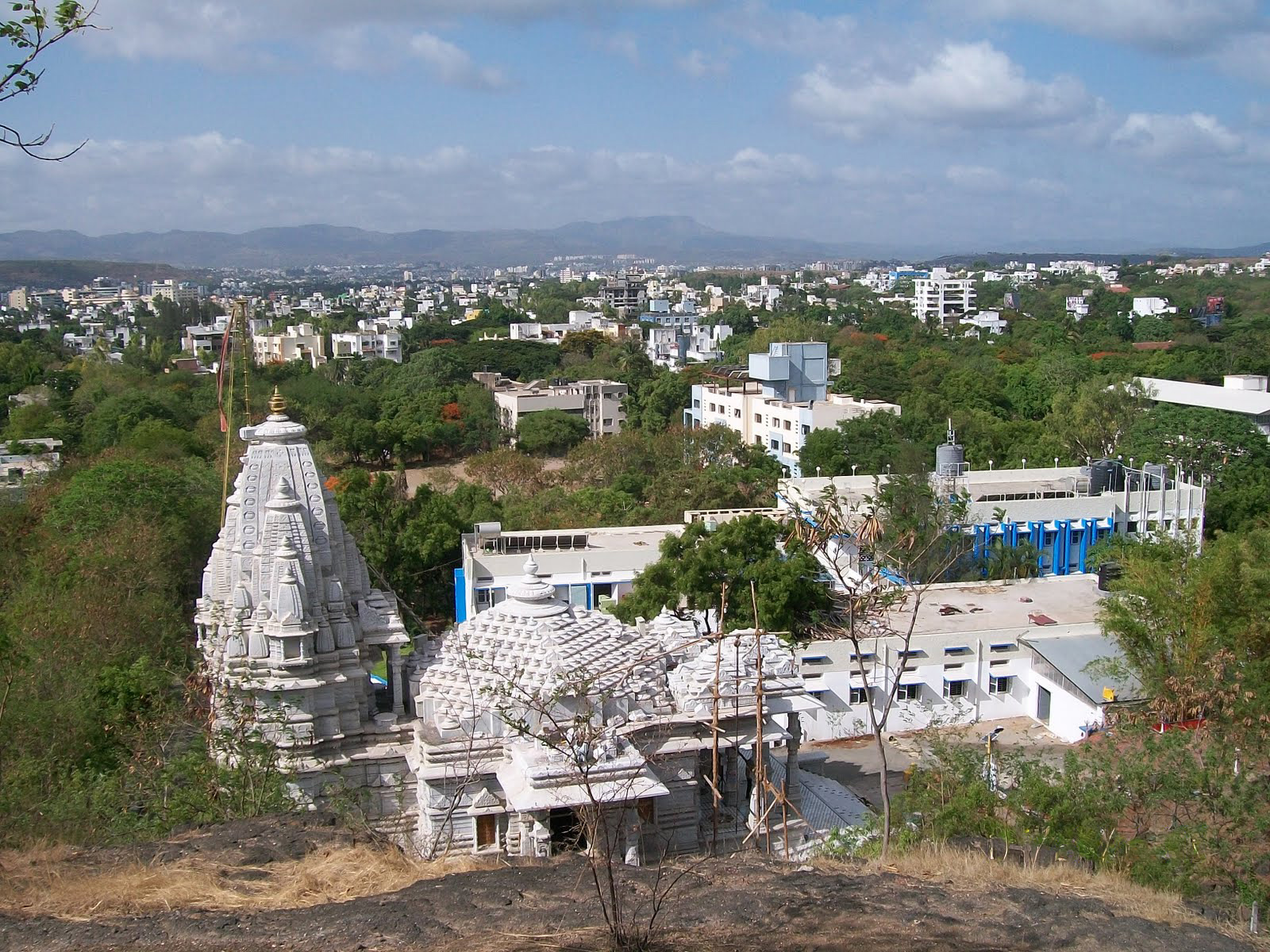
Mallinath Temple, Kosbad

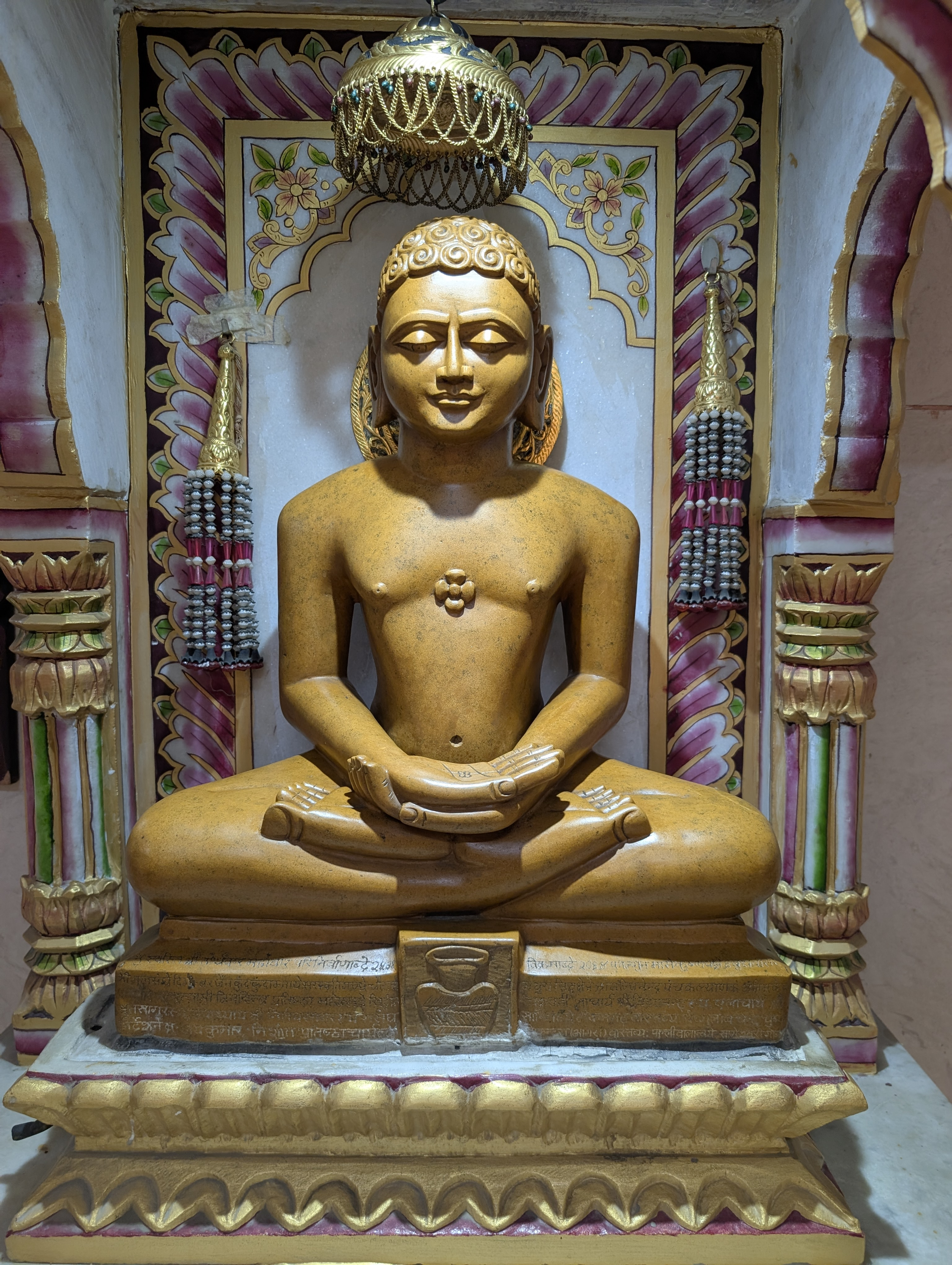
Tirthankara Mallinatha, Mathura Chaurasi Digambara Jain Temple

== See also ==
- God in Jainism
- Jainism and non-creationism
