= Champapuri =

Historical Side in Bhagalpur, India

Shri Champapuri Tirth
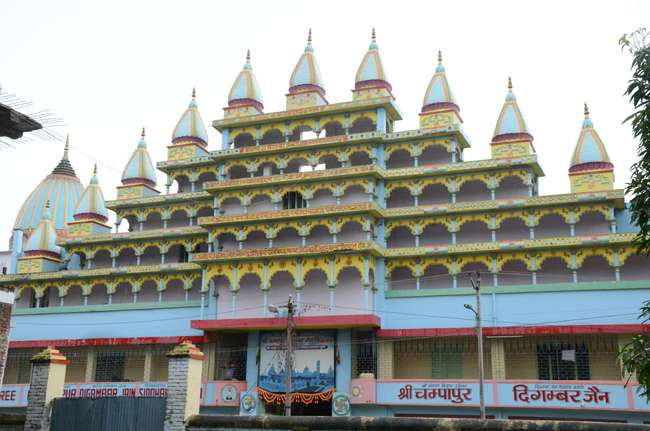
- Champapuri Mural at Krishnabai temple, Shri Mahavirji

- Location within Bihar

Religion
- Affiliation: Jainism
- Deity: Vasupujya
- Festivals: Mahamastakabhisheka, Mahavir Jayanti

Location
- Location: Bhagalpur City, Bihar
- Interactive map of Shri Champapuri Tirth
- Coordinates: 25°14′14.7″N 86°56′30.1″E

Architecture
- Temple: 12

Champapuri, Champa Nagri or Champanagar is a neighbourhood in Bhagalpur in the Indian state of Bihar. It is the site of the ancient city of Champa, the capital of the Anga Mahajanapada. It is also the main centre of capital of cultural region of Anga.

Champapuri is claimed to be the only place where all the five kalyanas- garbha, janma, diksha, kevalagnana and moksha kalyana of Bhagwan Vasupujya took place. It is said that Bhagawan Adinatha, Bhagwan Parshwanatha and Bhagawan Mahavira had their monsoon stay at this place. Bhagawan Mahavira had his third and twelfth monsoon stay at this place. There is an idol of Bhagavan at the temple.

An ancient temple of Champanala is seen at this place.

== Significance ==
Champapuri is also believed to be birthplace of Vasupujya, the twelfth tirthankara.

Teerthankara Adinath divided the country into 52 Janapadas; of these one was Anga and its capital was The chief pupil - Pattadhara of Tirthankara Mahavir Sudharmaswami and Jambuswami also came here.The fervent devotees of Shri Mahavira - Shravaka Kamadeva, Sudarshan Sheth, emperor Shripala and Satee Chandanbala were also born here.

According to Aupapatika Sutra (c. 1st-2nd century CE) forms part of the 12 Jain upanga āgamas as per Śvetāmbara tradition, a holy garden Purnabhadra Chaitya was situated to the north-east of this ancient city. When Mahavira visited Champa he is said to have lodged at this chaitya.

Many Jain ascetics, like Muni Dharmaghosh, Muni Padmarath, Ashok and Anchal, attained salvation there, as it was a Siddhakshetra An ancient temple of Champanala is seen at this place.

== Archaeology ==
The ancient city had an occupation of the Northern Black Polished Ware culture (700-200 BCE), with a surrounding fortification and moat. It was a notable centre of trade and commerce.

== Epigraphy ==
Two undated inscriptions palaeographically dated to the late 12th century still refer to the city of Champā. One, from Jayanagar (near Lakhisarai) and dated to the 35th year of the reign of Palapāla, records the installation of an image of a goddess called Purṇeśvarī or Puṇyeśvarī in the city; the other, from present-day Antichak near the great Buddhist establishment of Vikramaśilā, is heavily damaged.

== Statue Of Vasupujya ==
In 2014, the tallest statue of Bhagawan Vasupujya was built and donated by Smt Sona Devi Sethi Charitable Trust based at Dimapur, Nagaland. The statue is 31 feet in height and the stone for the statue was brought all the way from Karnataka.
