= Vira Nirvana Samvat =

Calendar used in Jainism

The Vira Nirvana Samvat (era) is a calendar era beginning on 7 October 527 BCE. It commemorates the nirvana of Mahavira, the 24th Jain Tirthankara. This is the oldest system of chronological reckoning which is still used in India.

== History ==
The earliest text to mention 527 BCE as the year of Mahavira's nirvana is Yati-Vrishabha's Tiloya-Pannatti (6th century CE). Subsequent works such as Jinasena's Harivamśa (783 CE) mention the Vira Nirvana era, and give the difference between it and the Shaka era (beginning in 79 CE) as 605 years, 5 months & 10 days.

On 21 October 1974, the 2500th Nirvana Mahotsava was celebrated (according to the Indian national calendar) by Jains throughout India and overseas.

== Usage ==
The Jain year Vira Nirvana Samvat is obtained by adding 469 or 470 years to the Kartikadi Vikram Samvat.

For example, The Vira Nirvana Samvat 2552 started right after Diwali of 20 October 2025 (Vikram Samvat 2082), Kartika Krishna Amavasya (Chaitradi and Purnimanta).

The new Chaitradiadi Vikram samvat (common in North India) starts seven months earlier in Chaitra, thus during Chaitra-Kartika Krishna, the difference between Vikram and Vir Nivana samvat is 469 years until Kartik Shukla 1 (Day following Diwali), when the difference becomes 470 years.

The Jain business people traditionally started their accounting year from Dipawali. The relationship between the Vir and Shaka era is given in Titthogali Painnaya and Dhavalaa by Acharya Virasena:

पंच य मासा पंच य वास छच्चेव होन्ति वाससया | परिणिव्वुअस्स अरिहितो तो उप्पन्नो सगो राया ||

Thus, the Nirvana occurred 605 years, 5 months and 10 days before the Saka era.

From Vikram samvat, Vira Nirvana Samvat is obtained by adding 470, except during April to November, when 469 should be added. That is because the North Indian (Chaitradi Purnimanta) Vikram Samvat increments with Chaitra Krishna to Chaitra Shukla transition, where as Vira Nirvana Samvat increments with Kartika Krishna to Kartika Shukla transition. From the Julian year, VNS is obtained by adding 526 from January to November and 527 during November to December.

== Jain calendar ==
The Jain calendar (Panchāng) is a lunisolar calendar, just like the traditional Vikram or Saka calendars . The months based on the position of the Moon with respect to the Earth and it is adjusted by adding an extra month (adhika masa) once every three years, to coincide with the Sun to bring month in phase with the season. Its day or date which is known as Tithi, indicates the moon phase and the month indicates the approximate season of the solar year.

The lunisolar calendar has the following arrangement: A regular or normal year has 12 months; a leap year has 13 months. A regular or normal year has 353, 354, or 355 days; a leap year has 383, 384, or 385 days.

The months in a Jain calendar are – Kartak, Maagsar, Posh, Maha, Faagan, Chaitra, Vaishakh, Jeth, Ashadh, Shravan, Bhadarvo, Aaso.

The average number of days in a month is 30 but the average number of days in a Lunisolar year is 354 and not 360 (12 months in a year) because it takes the Moon about 29.5 days (not 30 days) to complete the circle around the Earth. Hence one Tithi is eliminated in about duration of two months.

== See also ==
- Vikram Samvat
