= Dhanusha (unit) =

Dhanusha is an ancient unit of measuring height used in Jain literature.

== Modern units ==
One Dhanusha is approximately 3 meters.
