= Mahudi Jain Temple =

Śvetāmbara Jain Temple in Mahudi, Gujarat, India

Mahudi Jain Tirth
- મહુડી
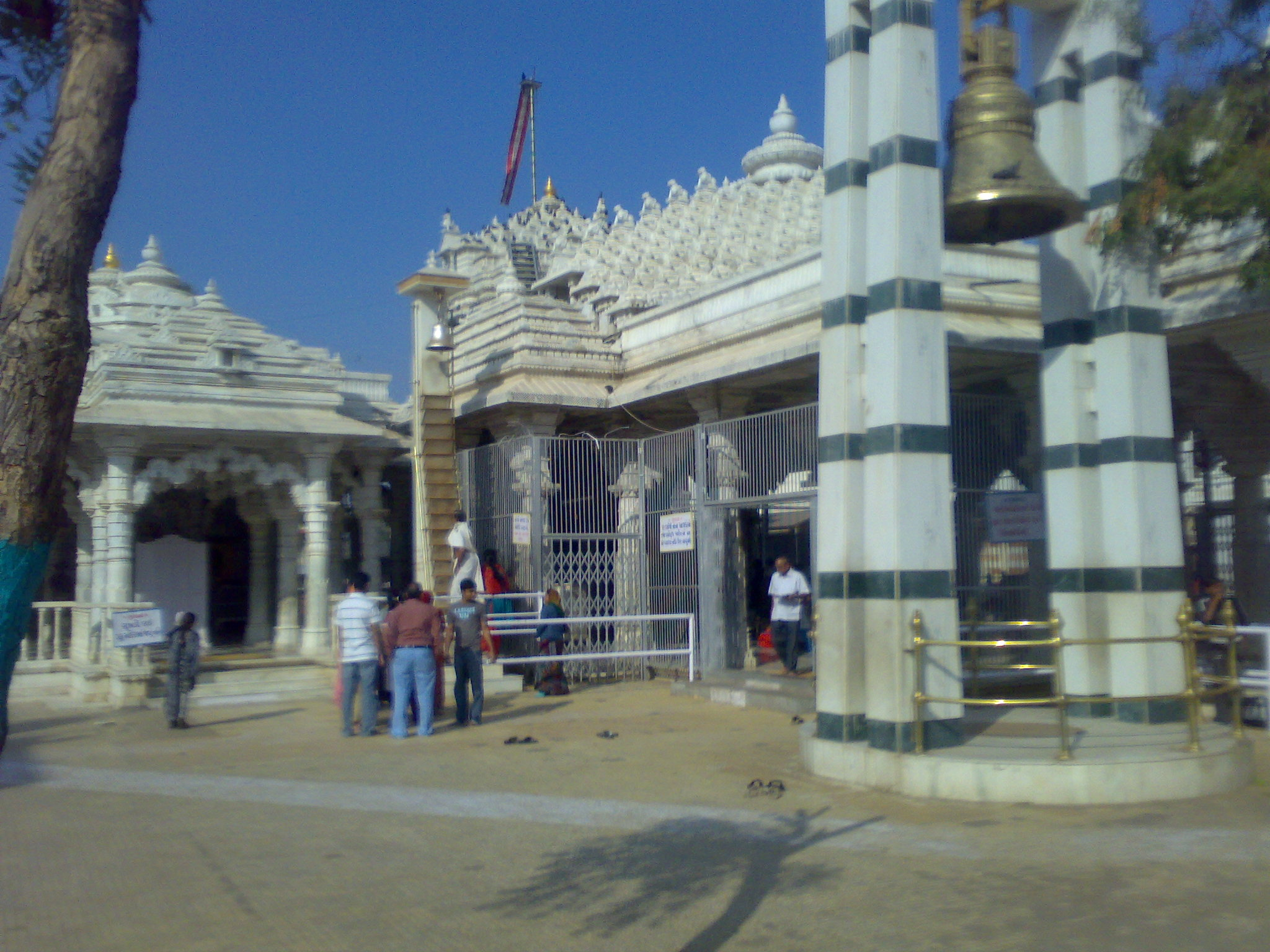
- Mahudi Jain Tirth

- Location within Gujarat

Religion
- Affiliation: Jainism
- Sect: Śvetāmbara
- Deity: Padmaprabhu, Ghantakarna Mahavir
- Festival: Kali Chaudas
- Governing body: Mahudi (Madhupuri) Jain Murtipujak Trust

Location
- Coordinates: 23°29′36″N 72°47′00″E

Architecture
- Creator: Buddhisagar Suri
- Established: 1917

Specifications
- Temple: 3
- Monument: 6

Website
- mahuditemple.com

Mahudi Jain Temple (a.k.a. Derasar) is situated in Mahudi town in Mansa taluka of Gandhinagar district, Gujarat. It is a pilgrimage centre for Śvetāmbara Jains and other communities who visit the temple of Jain deity, Ghantakarna Mahavir and of the 6th Tirthankara, Padmaprabh. It was known as Madhupuri historically.

== History ==
Mahudi Jain Temple was established by Śvetāmbara Jain monk, Buddhisagarsuri in 1917 CE (Maghsar Sudi 6, Vikram Samvat 1974). There is an inscription in Brahmi script. In 1916 CE, the foundation stone was laid on land donated by Vadilal Kalidas Vora. He, along with Punamchand Lallubhai Shah, Kankkuchand Narsidas Mehta, and Himmatlal Hakamchand Mehta became trustees of a trust established to manage the temple. The central deity of this temple is a 22-inch marble idol of Padmaprabh. There is a separate shrine dedicated to Ghantakarna Mahavir, the protector deity. The deity is holding a bow and arrow, not commonly seen in the temples of this faith which stresses the importance of non-violence. The Guru Mandir, a shrine dedicated to Buddhisagarsuri was established later.

== Culture ==
Devotees offer sukhadi a sweet that is made fresh on the premises to Ghantakarna Mahavir. After offering a part of it, the remaining is consumed by devotees within the temple complex. Tradition forbids the eating of it inside the main temple and the carrying away of such offerings outside premises. Guards monitor and redirect noncompliant devotees.

Every year, on Kali Chaudas (the fourteenth day of the dark half of the month of Aso), numerous devotees visit the Ghantakarna Mahavir temple to attend a religious ceremony, Havan.

Next to the temple outside, devotees of all ages climb a ladder to ring the bell.

== Gallery ==
Padmaprabha image in the Jain temple

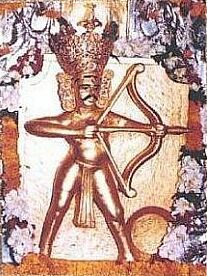
Ghantakarna Mahavir

Vadilal Kalidas Vora who donated the land for the temple

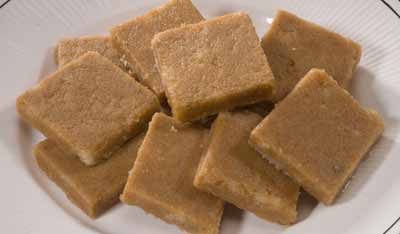
Sukhdi - sweet offered to Ghantakarna Mahavir

== See also ==
- Padampura
- Vijapur
- Ghantakarna Mahavir
