= Jainism in Gujarat =

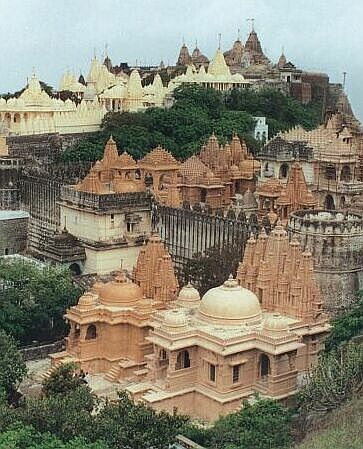
Palitana temples

Jainism has had a notable following in Gujarat. According to the 2011 Census of India, around 0.959% of the population of Gujarat is Jain. There are several old Jain temples that draw pilgrims from Jains around the world in places such as Palitana, Taranga, Sankheshwar, Idar.

== History ==
Jains believe that their 22nd Tirthankara (propagators of the Jain religion) Neminath attained Moksha/ Nirvana on Girnar in Gujarat. Many other holy Kalyanak places are present in Gujarat like Palitana(Shatrunjaya), Girnar, etc. Many other monks have also got attained Moksha in Gujarat; especially on the holy mountains of Girnar and Shatrunjaya. The Jain councils were held in Vallabhi c. 5th century CE. Their canonical scriptures were written down during this council. King Vanaraja Chavda (c. 720-780 CE) of the Chavda dynasty was brought up by a Jain monk named Shilaguna Suri.

Jain temples are found in Gujarat from as early as the 6th and 7th centuries CE. It was patronized by the Chaulukyas and Chavadas. Dhank Caves (3rd-7th century CE) in Rajkot district has Jain Tirthankara carvings. Northern Gujarat became a principle center of Jainism in the 13th century CE.

The earliest known Old Gujarati text Bharat-Bahubali Ras, was written by a Jain monk Shalibhadra Suri. Of the most important people in Gujarat's Jain history were the Acharya Hemachandra Suri and his pupil, the Chaulukya ruler Kumarapala.

== Major Centers ==
Major ancient Jain centers include:

- Palitana
- Girnar
- Bhadreshwar
- Mahudi
- Shankheshwar
- Patan
- Taranga
- Radhanpur Jain Tirth
- Ahmedabad
- Surat
- Khambhat

== Photo gallery ==
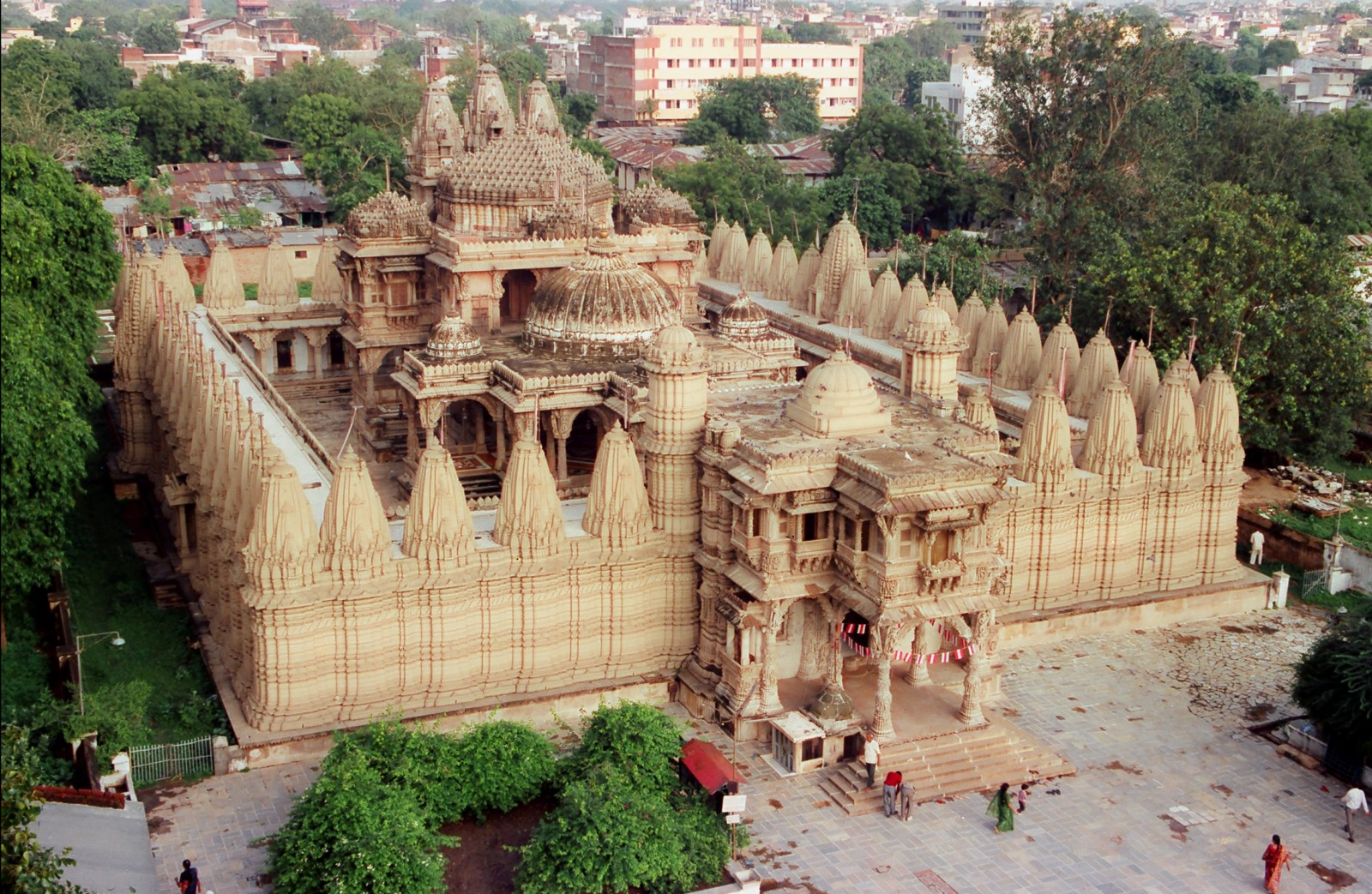
Hutheesing Jain Temple in Ahmedabad

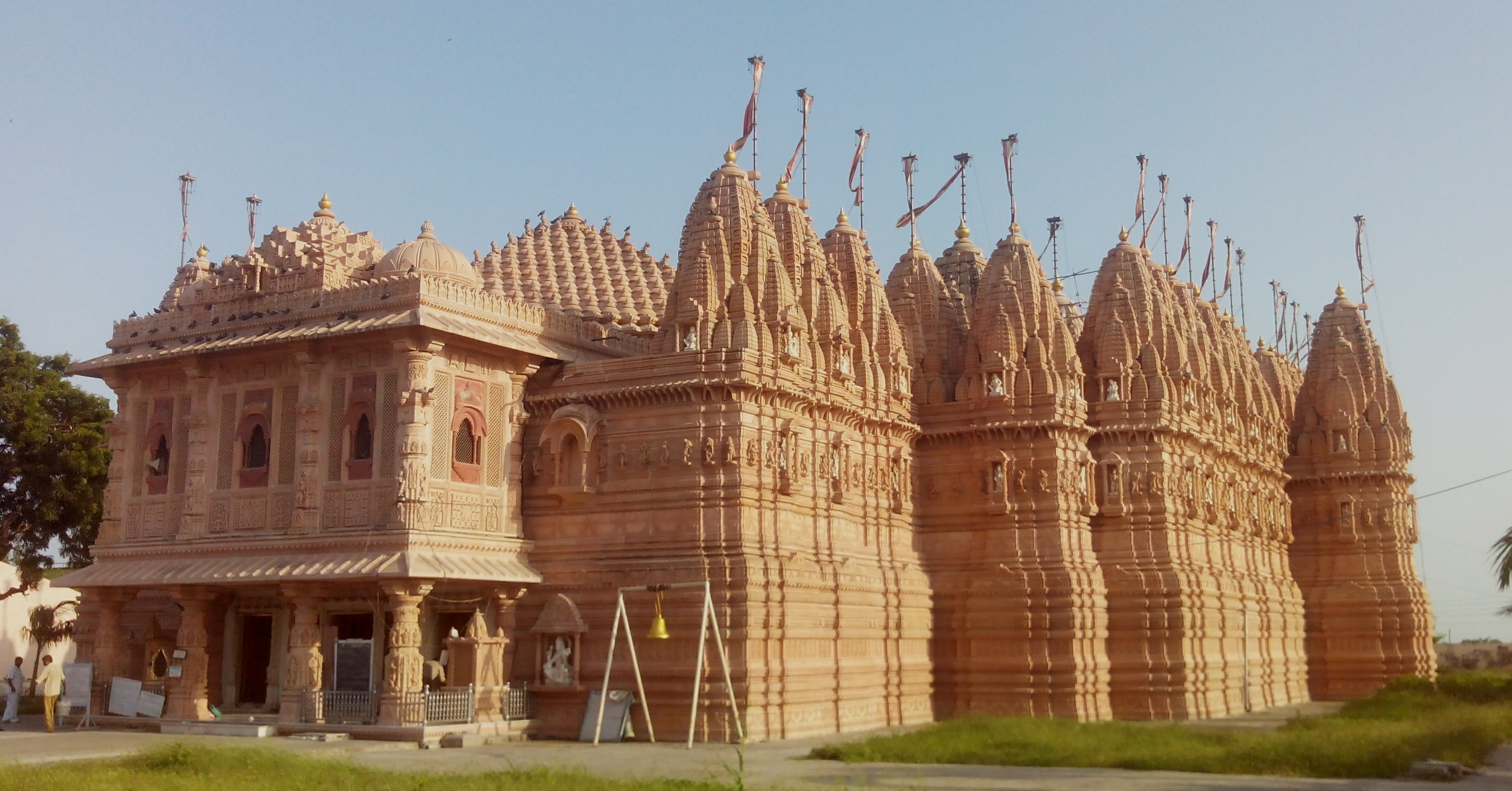
Vasai Jain Temple, Bhadreshwar

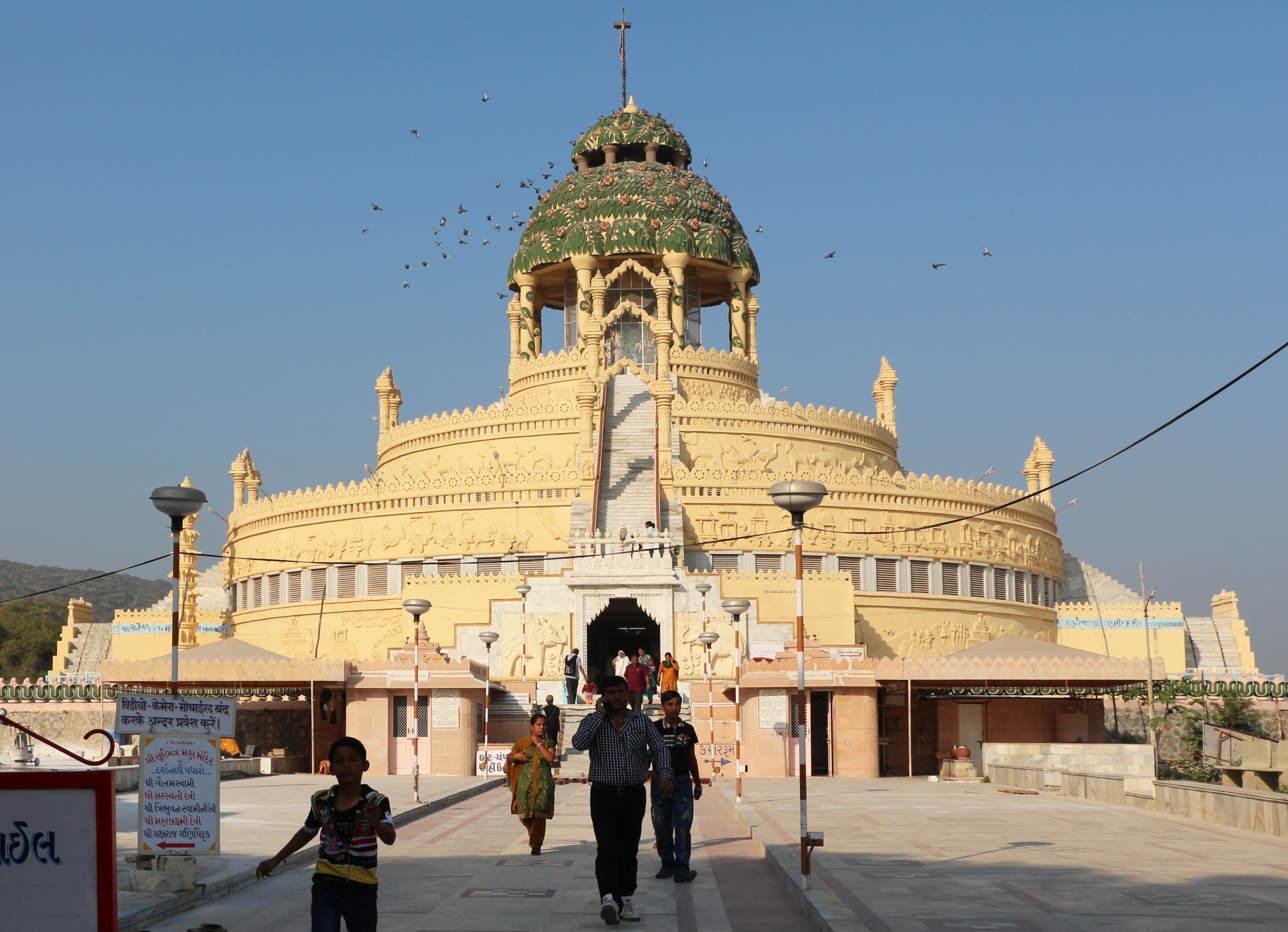
Samovsaran Mandir, Palitana Teerth

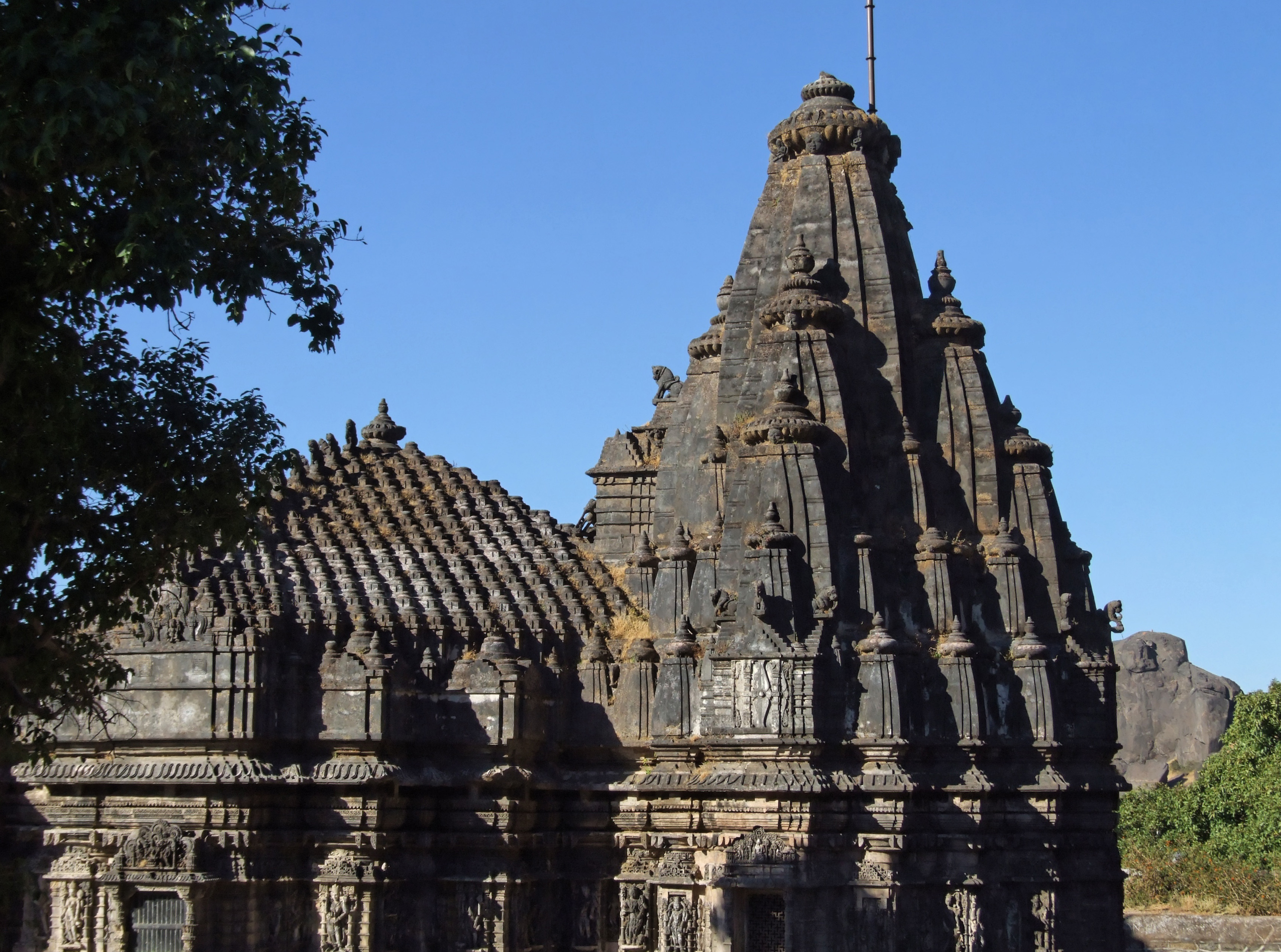
Girnar

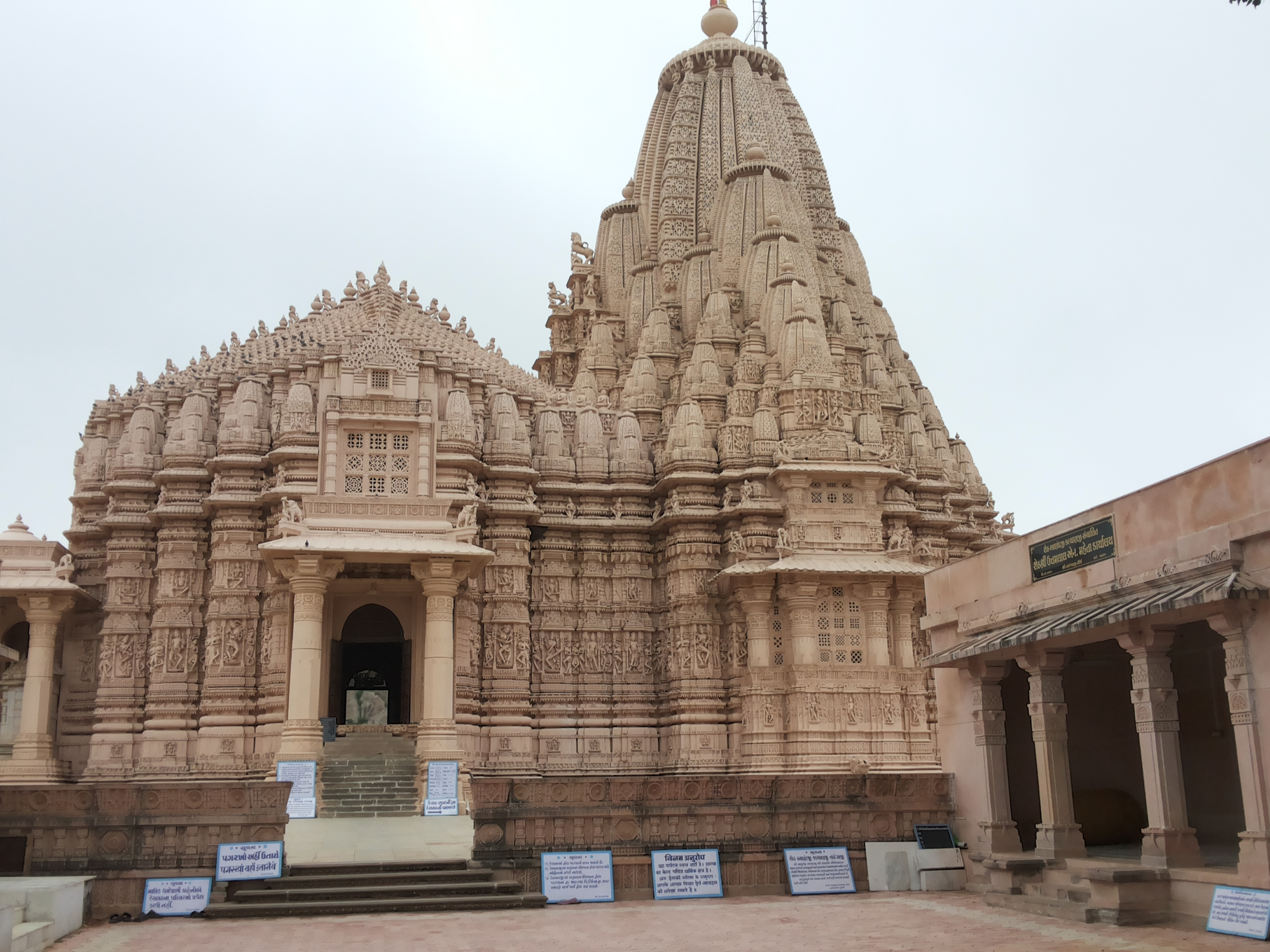
Taranga

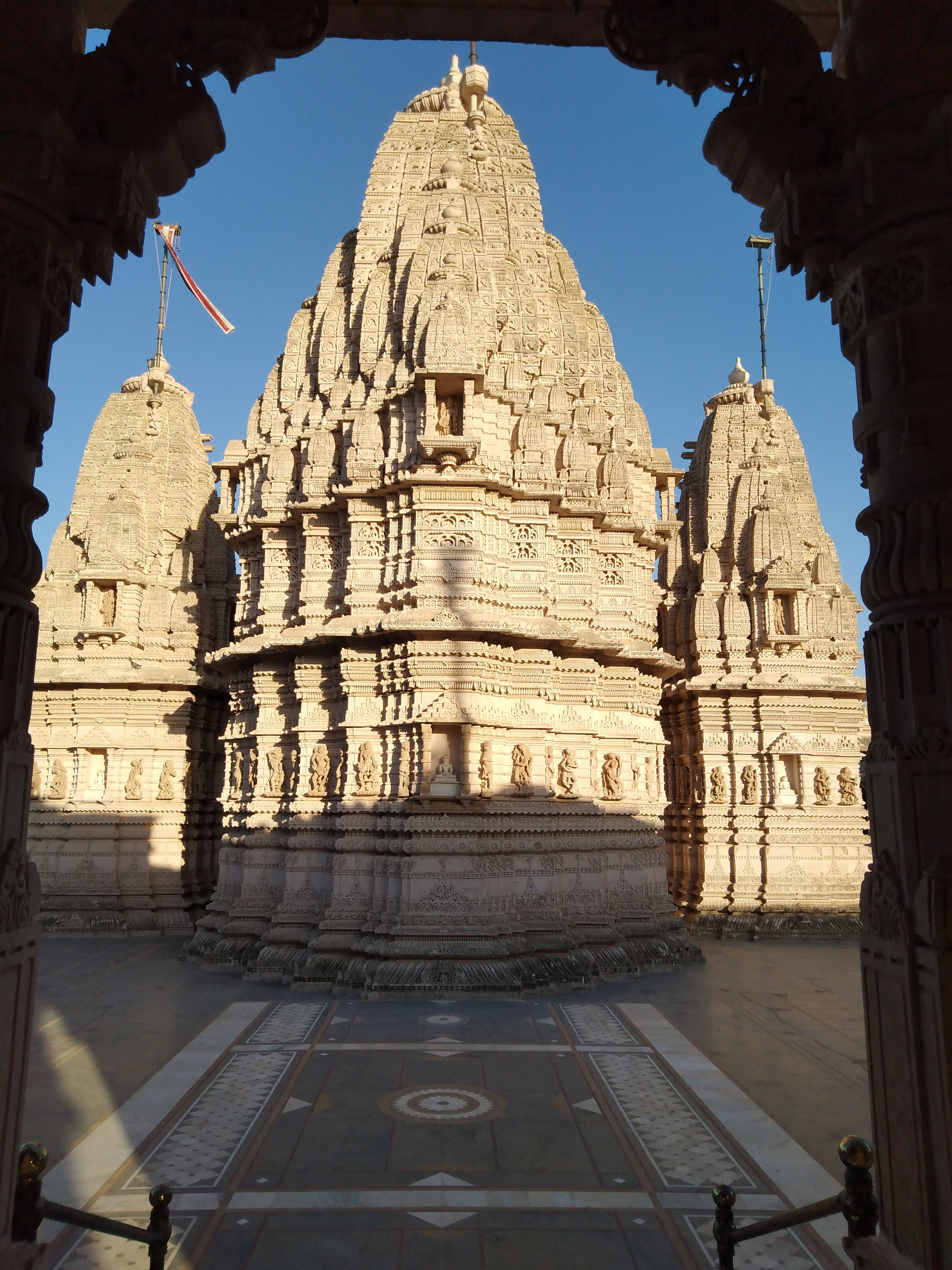
Vanki - Patri Jain Mandir, Kutch

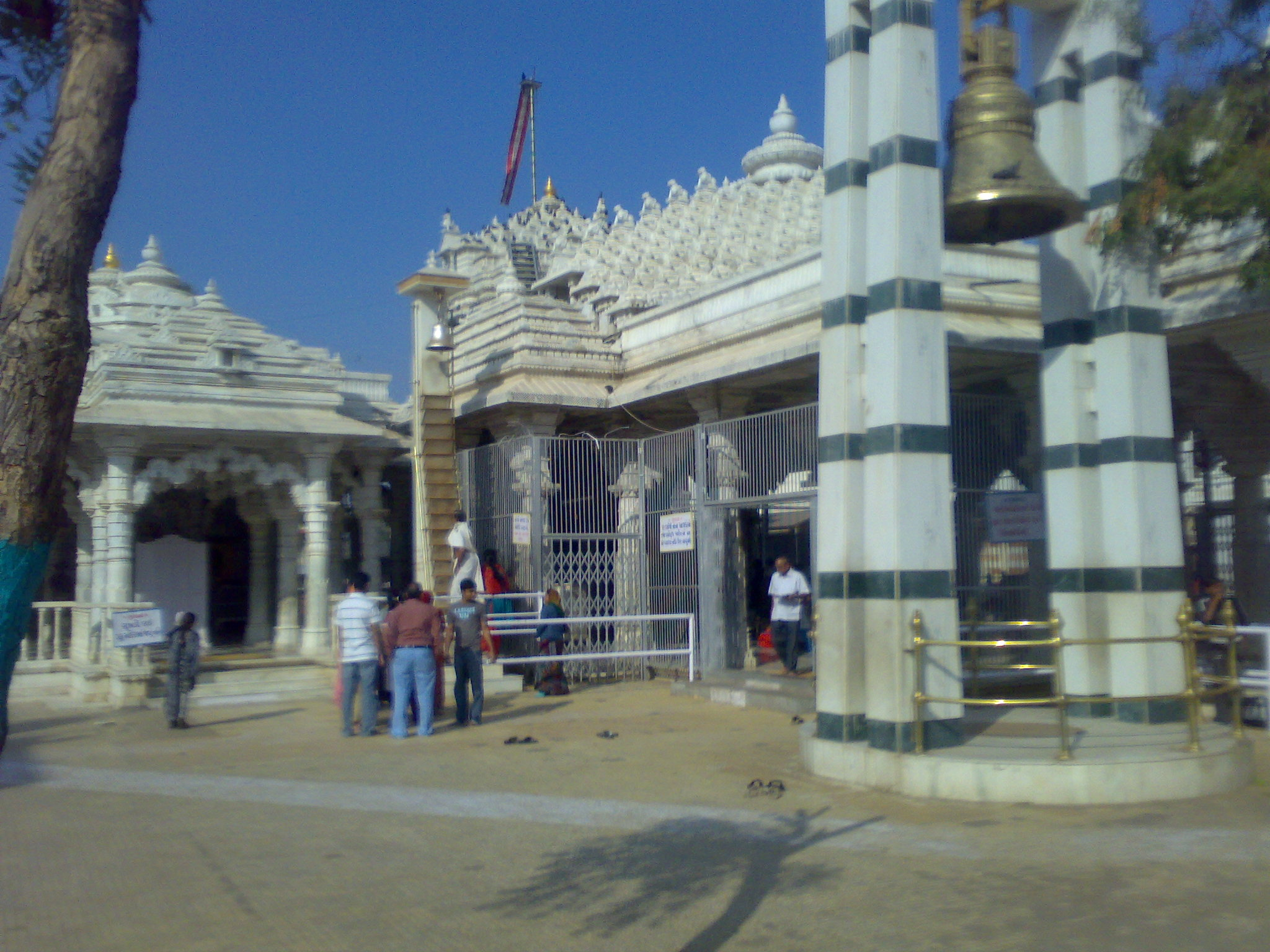
Mahudi Jain Temple

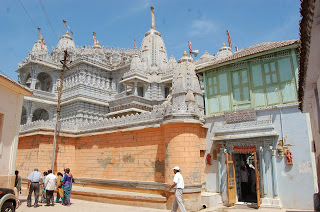
Shri Shantinath Jain Derasar, Kothara

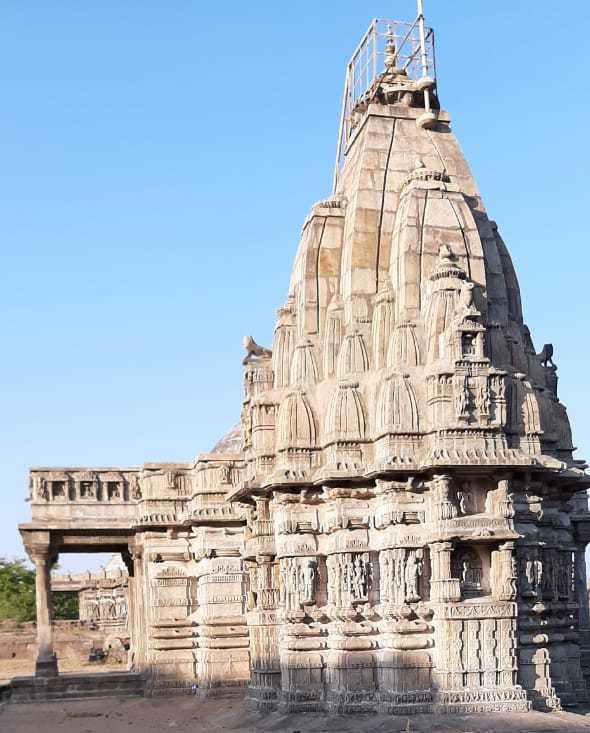
Shri Pavagadh Tirth, part of Champaner-Pavagadh a UNESCO World Heritage Site

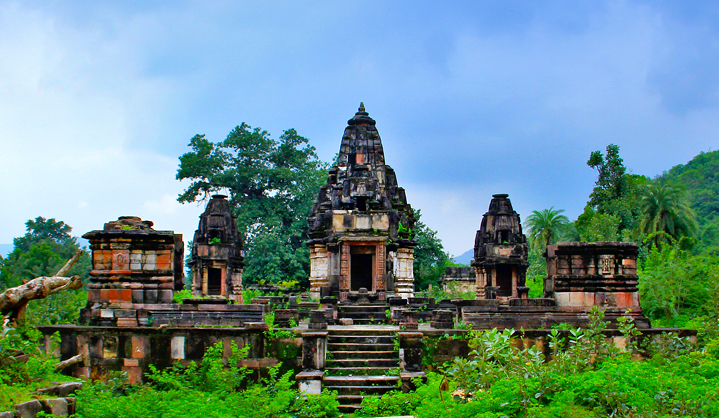
Jain temples, Abhapur

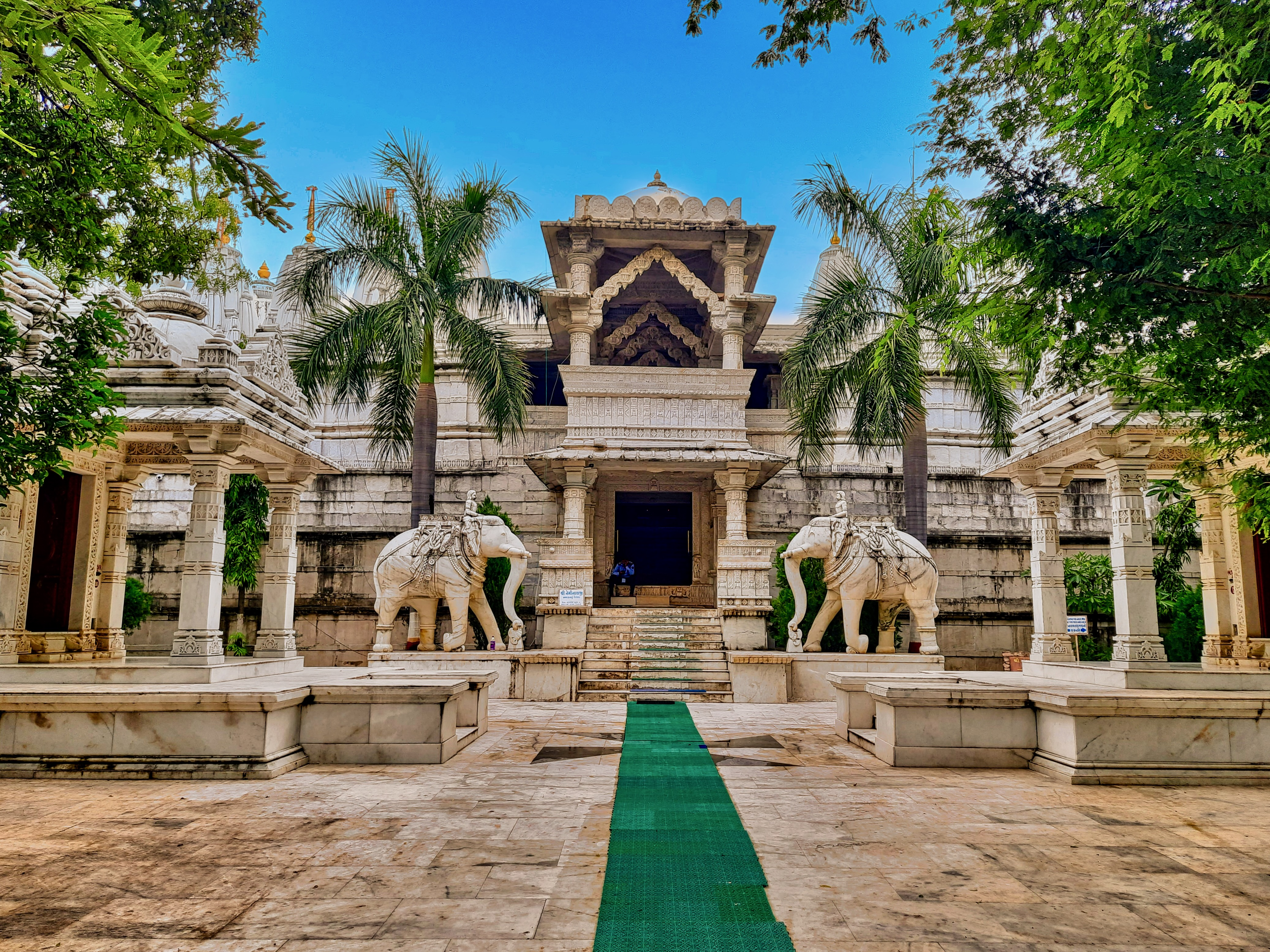
Kumbharia Jain temples

== See also ==
- Kanji Swami
- Palitana temples
