= Jahaj Mandir =

Śvetāmbara Jain temple in Rajasthan, India

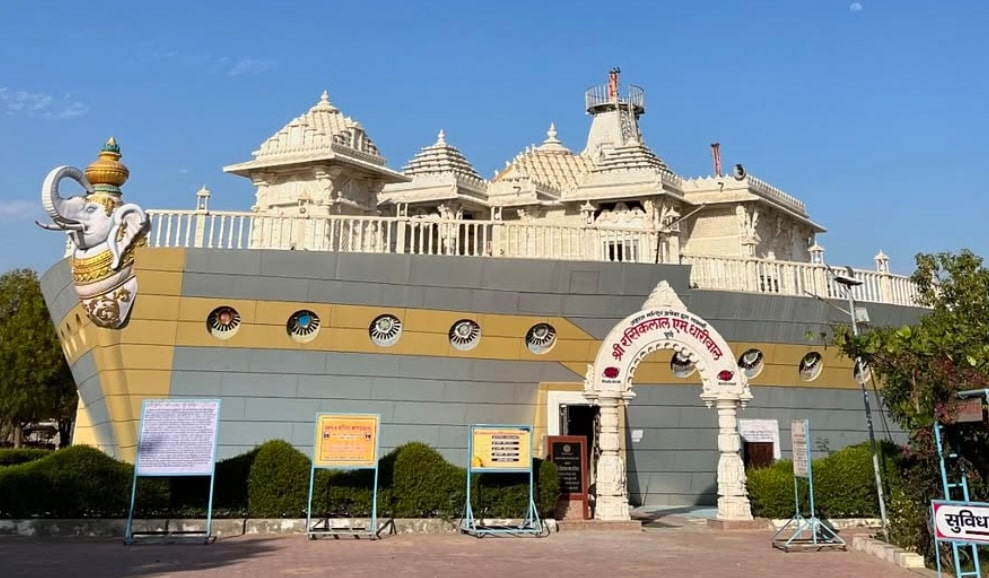
- Jahaj Mandir

- Location in Rajasthan

Religion
- Affiliation: Jainism
- Sect: Śvetāmbara

Location
- Location: Mandwala, Jalore district, Rajasthan
- Coordinates: 25°25′45.9″N 72°31′24.2″E

Architecture
- Established: 1993
- Temple: 3

Website
- https://www.jahajmandir.com

Jahaj Mandir is a Jain temple in the village of Mandwala in the Jalore district, Rajasthan, India. The temple is built in the shape of a boat and is carved from marble. The temple was founded in 1993 for the religion of Jainism.

On 9 May 1993, the foundation stone of the temple was laid at Mandawala. On 30 January 1999, the temple was built in the shape of a ship. In temple, there are 24 Tirthankaras here. There is a temple. Idols of all the Tirthankaras of Jainism have been made, which are made of diamonds, gems, pearls, emeralds, rubies etc.

== History ==
The Jahaj Mandir is built in a Ship's shape, the temple stands 55 feet in height made up of makrana marble. It is believed on 3 December 1985, Acharya Shri Jin Kantisagar Suri ji was on his way to Jivana and was amidst his Chatur-Mas. Around 12:00 in noon that he started to feel uneasy and soon experienced fever. That very moment he sensed the sun of his life setting in. He summoned his disciple Gurudev Shri Maniprabhsagarji and intimated to him that now the time had arrived for him to take over his role and responsibilities. 4 Dec. his soul the departed the body at 9:16 in the morning. "Agnisanskar" the funeral was held on the following day. Thousands of followers gathered for the ceremony. During the funeral, a very strange and astonishing incidence took place. From the raging flames of the fire Acharya's right hand flung out and began to sway. This was his final blessings to his thousands of devotees. The crowd overwhelmingly cheered Jay-jaykars and filled the space. This went on for about half an hour. The media ran around to cover the event and captured the magical scene in their cameras.

== Temple Complex ==
=== Main Temple ===
The Main Temple consists of Seven deities:
The idol Shantinatha is the Moolnayak and occupies the centre place. The statue is made of Panchadhatu and with a thick plating of Gold.
Shri Adinathji and Shri Vasupujya ji are placed on left and right of the Moolnayak respectively.
On the right as we proceed we find Mahaveer Swami ji and Shri Shankeshwar Parshvanath ji on the extreme right.
Where as towards the left after Adinathji we have Shri Sumatinatha and on the extreme left Shri Stambhan Parshvanath ji.

=== Left Temple ===
The left hand side of the Temple consists of Three deities.
Here we have the statues of Ambika Deviji, Shri Nakoda Bahirav and Acharya Shri KantisagarSuriji

=== Right Temple ===
The Right hand side of the Temple consists of Seven deities.
Here we have the statues of Shri Kala Bhairavji, Shri Jinkushal Suriji, Shri Ghantakarna Mahavir, Gora Bhairavji, Shri Jindutt suriji, Shri Jinchandra Suriji and Padmavati mata.
