= Mahudi =

Mahudi Madhupuri
- Town
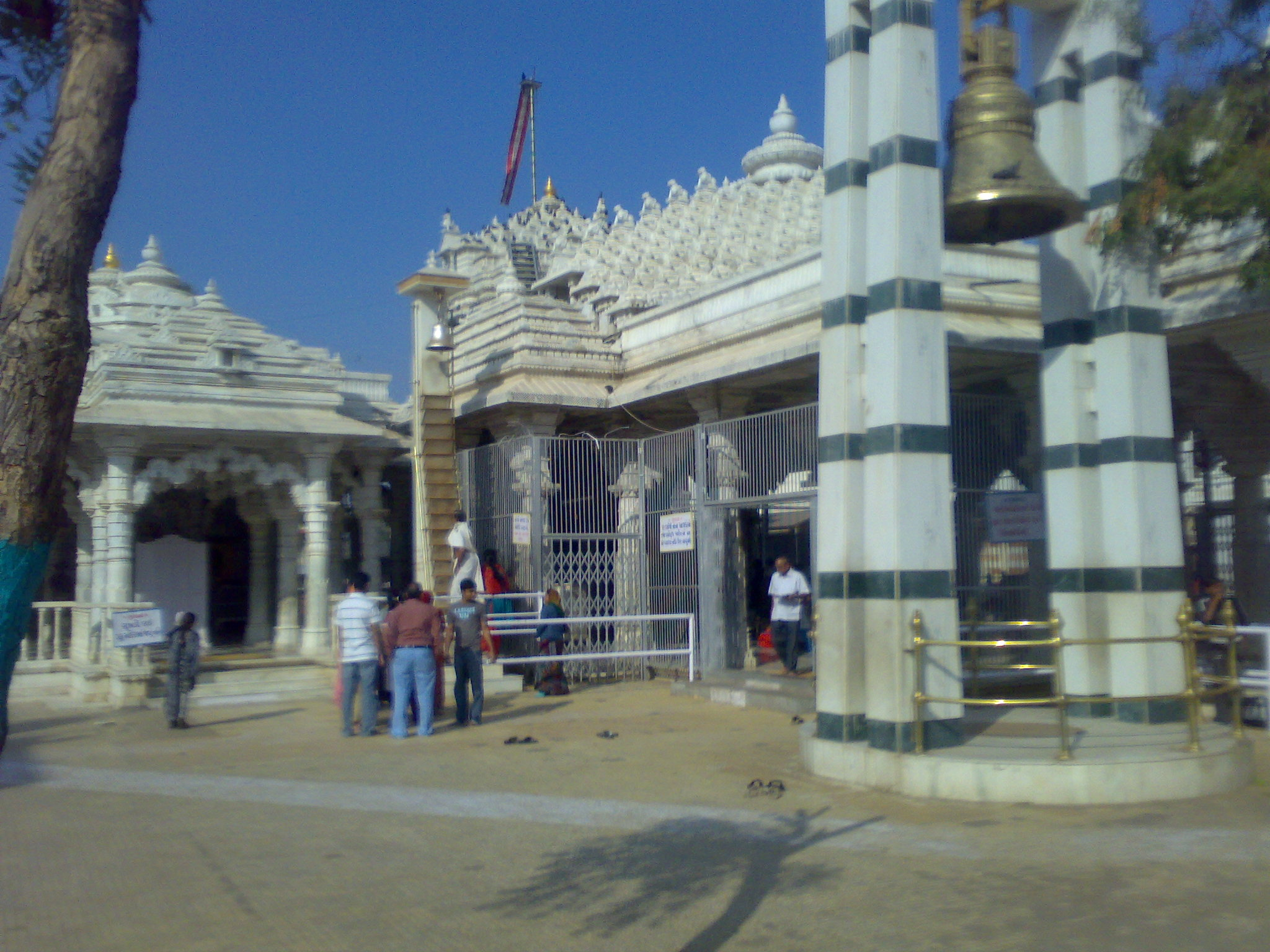
- Mahudi Jain Temple

- Location in Gujarat, India Mahudi (India)
- Coordinates: 23°29′N 72°47′E
- Country: India
- State: Gujarat
- District: Gandhinagar district

Languages
  - Official: Gujarati, Hindi
- Time zone: UTC+5:30 (IST)
- PIN: 385855
- Vehicle registration: starting with GJ 18
- Sex ratio: ♂/♀

Mahudi is a town in Mansa taluka of Gandhinagar district, Gujarat, India situated on the banks of Madhumati river, a tributary of Sabarmati River. It is a pilgrimage centre of Jains and other communities visiting the temple of Jain deity, Ghantakarna Mahavir and Padmaprabhu Jain Temple. It used to be known as Madhupuri.

== Mahudi Jain temple ==
Mahudi Jain Temple was established by Jain monk, Buddhisagar Suri in 1917 CE (Magshar Sudi 6, Vikram Samvat 1974). There is an inscription in the Brahmi script of it. The foundation stone was laid in 1916 CE on land donated by Vadilal Kalidas Vora. He along with Punamchand Lallubhai Shah, Kankkuchand Narsidas Mehta and Himmatlal Hakamchand Mehta became trustees of trust established to manage the temple. The 22-inch marble idol of Padmaprabh as a central deity was installed. The separate shrine dedicated to protector deity, Ghantakarna Mahavir was also established. Guru Mandir, a shrine dedicated to Buddhisagar Suri was established later.

Devotees offer sukhadi, a sweet to Ghantakarna Mahavir. After offering, it is consumed by devotees within the temple complex.

=== Important event ===
Every year, on Kali Chaudas (the fourteenth day of the dark half of the month of Aso), thousands of devotees visit the temple to attend a religious ceremony, Havan.

== Other places ==
- Kotyrak Khadayata temple is dedicated to Krishna and is kuldevta of Khadayata community.
- Padma Pyramid Centre is another Jain temple nearby in shape of pyramid.

== See also ==
- Vijapur
- Swaminarayan Akshardham (Gandhinagar)
