= Vimalsagarsuri =

21st century Indian Jain ascetic

Acharya Vimalsagarsuri Maharaj Saheb
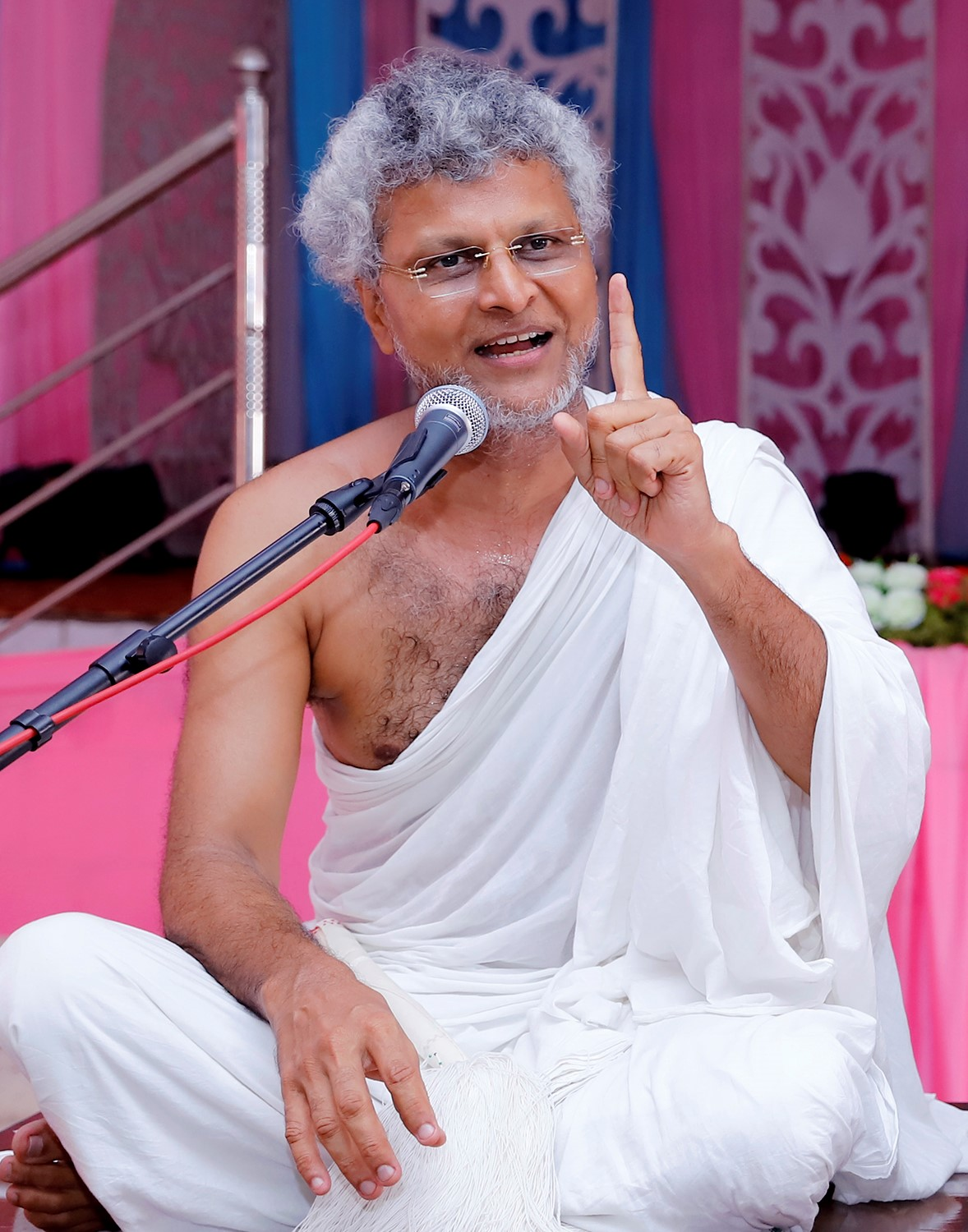
- Acharya Vimalsagarsuri

Personal life
- Born: Indrakumar Bagrecha; April 23, 1966 (age 60) Hiriyur, Karnataka
- Parents: Shri Chaganrajji Bagrecha (father); Shrimati Suadevi Bagrecha (mother)

Religious life
- Religion: Jainism
- Sect: Śvetāmbara
- Initiation: by Acharya Padmasagarsuri

Vimalsagarsuri is an eminent and popular Jain monk and Acharya of the Tapa Gaccha of the Śvetāmbara sect of Jainism. He belongs to the lineage of Acharya Buddhisagarsuri.

== Early life ==
Acharya Vimalsagarsuri was born on April 23, 1966, in Hiriyur, Karnataka into an Oswal Jain family, to Suadevi Bagrecha and Chaganrajji Bagrecha. In terms of formal education, he dropped out of school after passing the 8th grade. He displayed an interest in learning and mastering multiple languages including Hindi, Gujarati, Sanskrit, Prakrit, English, Marathi, and Rajasthani.

== Initiation and ascetic life ==
At the age of 16, Vimalsagarsuri was initiated as a Jain monk in a ceremony held on April 19, 1982, in Chennai. He was initiated by Acharya Padmasagarsuri of the Buddhisagarsuri Samudaay of the Tapa Gaccha of Śvetāmbara Jains. On December 1, 2014, he was consecrated as an Acharya after 22 years of monkhood in a ceremony held at the Nakodaji Shwetambar Jain Tirth. He has delivered over 6,000 discourses and has a large number of young followers. He usually uses Hindi as the medium of instruction in his sermons to reach a larger audience. He revived the ancient Jain practices of different types of meditation and also created the Shri Ghantakarna Mahayantram, Shri Manibhadra Mahayantram, Shri Parshva Padmavati Mahayantram and Shrut Devi Yantram , which, according to Jain scriptures, are important objects of meditation. He is particularly popular among Śvetāmbara Jains for his yearly 5-day-long Shrut Sadhna (meditation for knowledge).

In his ascetic life, he is said to have learned several canonical and non-canonical Jain scriptures, as well as scriptures of other faiths before becoming an Acharya. Afterward, he also consecrated several temples and idols. Due to his efforts, Haribhadra Suri's Samarditya Mahakatha, which was only available in Gujarati in addition to its originally language, was translated and presented in Hindi for the first time to reach a larger audience.

== Social initiatives ==
Acharya Vimalsagarsuri has undertaken extensive padayatras (walks), covering approximately 70,000 kilometers across Western India and South India, mainly in the states of Tamil Nadu, Andhra Pradesh, Karnataka, Goa, Maharashtra, Madhya Pradesh, Gujarat, and Rajasthan. The purpose of these walks is to reach out to communities far and wide to spread the message of Jainism. The other means he uses include transformation camps, awakening seminars, children's development workshops, family counseling sessions, and spiritual knowledge seminars.

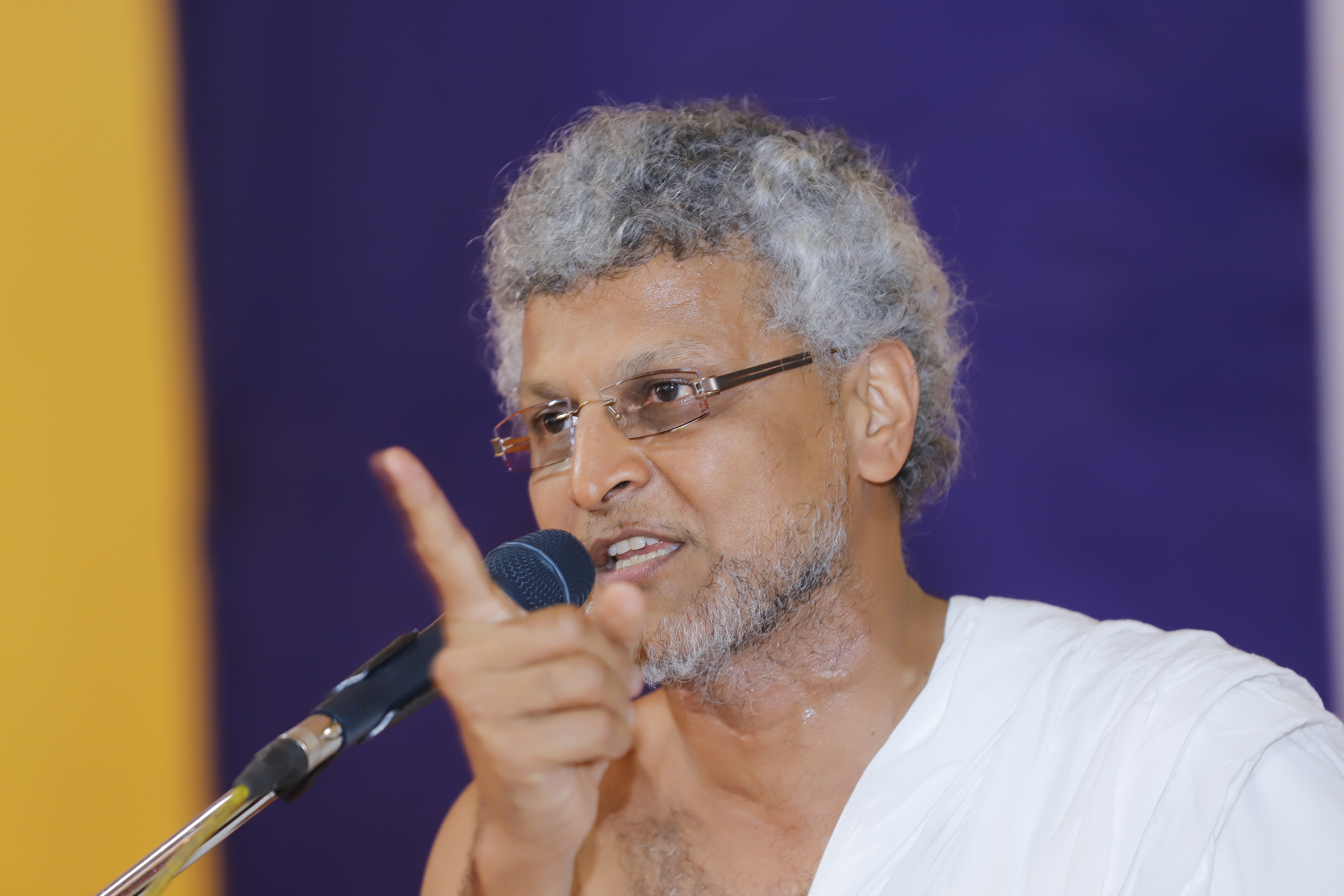
Acharya Vimalsagarsuri Maharaja

He is known for actively promoting interfaith harmony through his speeches and sermons, which he has delivered in various settings, including mosques, Hindu temples, and public gatherings. He has been invited as a guest by Buddhist and Sikh scholars at their events. He has also voiced strong support for initiation into the Jain faith as a monk, describing it as an "ideological revolution." In addition to raising awareness about India's history and heritage, he advocates for safeguarding the interests of the Jain community. Acharya Vimalsagarsuri is also among the few Jain monks who have delivered sermons to prostitutes, encouraging them to leave their profession and pursue a better life.

== Sources ==
- Devluk, Nandlal B.2010. Vishwa Ajayabi Jain Shraman. Arihant Prakashan.
- Devluk, Nandlal B.2008. Jinshasan na Zalhlta Nakshatro.Arihant Prakashan.

== See also ==
- Buddhisagarsuri
- Vimalsuri
- Kalapurnasuri
