= Ghantakarna Mahavir =

Protector deity in Jain mythology

- Kshatriya protector deity (Vira)
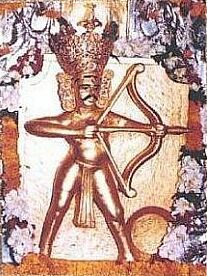
- Ghantakarna Mahavir
- Devanagari: घंटाकर्ण महावीर
- Gujarati: ઘંટાકર્ણ મહાવીર
- Venerated in: Jainism
- Major cult center: Mahudi
- Mantra: Gantakarana Mantra Stotra
- Weapon: Bow and arrow
- Region: Gujarat, India
- Festivals: Kali Chaudas

Ghantakarna Mahavira is one of the fifty-two viras (protector deities) of Svetambara Jainism. He is chiefly associated with Tapa Gaccha, a monastic lineage. He was a deity of the Jain tantrik tradition. There is a shrine dedicated to him at the Mahudi Jain Temple established by Buddhisagar Suri, a Jain monk, in nineteenth century. It is one of the popular Jain pilgrimage centres of India.

== History ==
Ghantakarna Mahavira is a Jain deity from the Jain tradition and is worshiped and venerated by some specific monastic lineages and probably many laymen. He is one of the fifty-two viras (protector deities) and is called Mahavira (Great vira). The verse 67 of Gantakarana Mantra Stotra by Vimalachandra states that he is worshipped since the time of Haribhadra (c. 6-8th century). There is other corroborating evidence. In Ghantakrana-kalpa, Vimalachandra mentions him as a vira as well as kshetrapala (guardian deity of the land). Late commentary on the Namiuna-stava (verse 1) also mentions his veneration. The veneration transmitted from the teacher to the disciple. Ravisagar Suri initiated Buddhisagar Suri (1874-1925) in February 1898. After having direct vision of Ghantakarna, Buddhisagar Suri established an image of Ghantakarna at Mahudi Jain Temple. The worship is further popularised by Jayasimha Suri, Sarabhai Nawab and other Swetambara people. Ghantakarna is not known among Digambara Jains. John E. Cort states it as a reformulation of a private tradition in a devotional public tradition.

== Worship ==
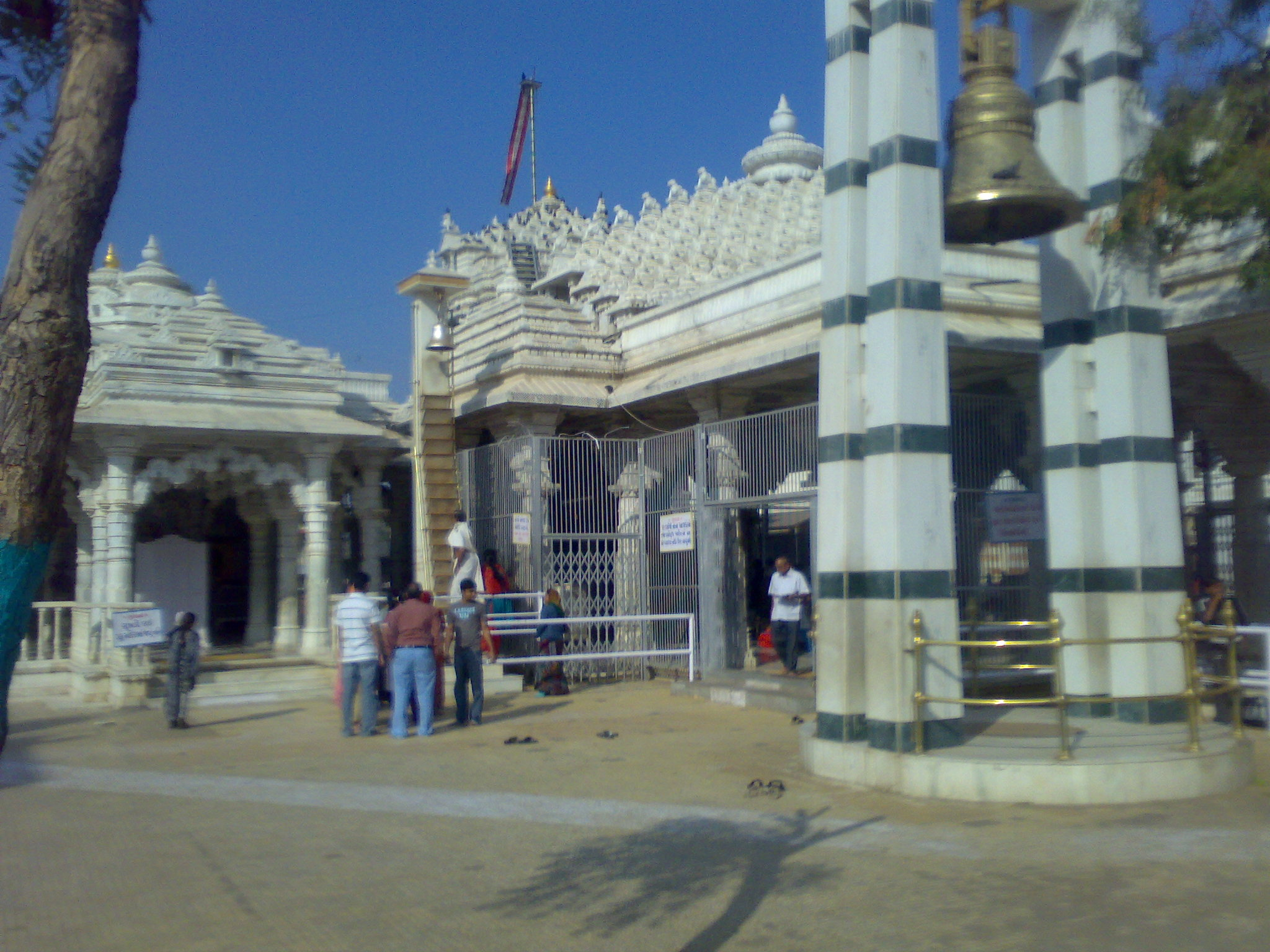
Mahudi Jain Temple

Ghantakarna is invoked for protection from variety of obstacles and difficulties such as epidemics, diseases, fire, invasions, ghosts. He is also invoked for the protection from the opponents of Jainism.

Mahudi Jain temple is one of the popular Jain pilgrimage centres of India. Thousands of devotees visit it and offers Sukhdi (mixture of jaggery, wheat and ghee), a sweet there. After offering, it is consumed by devotees within the temple complex. His images are also found in other Jain temples in western India.

On Kali Chaudas (the fourteenth day of the dark half of the month of Aso), thousands of devotees visit the Mahudi temple to attend a religious ceremony, Havan.

== Texts ==
Gantakarana Mantra Stotra is a Sanskrit text associated with him which has 71 verses and is used as a mantra as well as hymn. It was composed in later half of the 16th century by a little known Jain monk Vimalachandra who was a disciple of Sakalachandra, a disciple of Tapa Gaccha monk Hiravijaya Suri. There are other Gantakarna Mantras as well. Ghantakrana-kalpadi-sangrah published by Sarabhai M. Nawab is a collection of late manuscripts such as Ghantakarna-kalpa from Jain libraries with 26 illustrations. He has included some instructions in Gujarati in Ghantakarna-kalpa No. 2 and No. 3 but has not mentioned its source of translation or any manuscript. The Sanskrit mantra in No. 3 is the only mantra common is texts found in Jain libraries.

== Mythology ==
In past life, Ghantakarna Mahavir was a king Tungabhadra or Mahabal from Shrinagar and had died fighting thieves to protect the innocents and pilgrims going to Shri Parvat. He reincarnated as Ghantakarna Mahavir, the thirtieth among fifty-two Viras (protector deities).

== Iconography ==
There is no Jain textual authority to the iconography of Ghantakarna Mahavir described in kalpa texts or modern paintings. Until Buddhisagar Suri established anthropomorphic image of Ghantakarna Mahavir at Mahudi Jain Temple, Ghantakarna Mahavir was worshiped only in anthropomorphic yantras and in an abstract forms. In paintings, he is depicted as a two, four, six or eight armed with the bow and the arrow. He is also depicted with the shield, the sword, the mace, the shield, the vajra, the bow and arrow, the rosary, and the banner. The anthropomorphic image shows a standing man holding the bow and the arrow aimed towards left, having a crown on his head and the bell-shaped earrings. He has bell-shaped ears (Ghanta and karna) so he was called Ghantakarna Mahavir.

== See also ==
- Manibhadra
