= Vijapur =

- City
- Location in Gujarat, India Vijapur (India)
- Coordinates: 23.57°N 72.75°E
- Country: India
- State: Gujarat
- District: Mehsana

Government
  - Type: Municipality
  - Body: Vijapur Municipality
- Elevation: 116 m (381 ft)

Population (2011)
  - Total: 25,558

Languages
  - Official: Gujarati, Hindi, English
- Time zone: UTC+5:30 (IST)
- PIN: 384570(new), 382870(old)
- Vehicle registration: GJ-02
- Website: vijapurnagarpalika.com

Vijapur is a city and a municipality in the Mehsana district in the Indian state of Gujarat.

== Heritage and religious significance ==
1.Vijapur heritage sahi Eidgah mosque years 1602, Vijapur 2.Vijapur is the birthplace of Jain monk Buddhisagar Suri. Buddhisagarsuri (1874–1925) was an ascetic, philosopher and author of the early 20th century. He wrote more than one hundred books. He was born in nearby Manipura village. His birth name was Patel. He achieved enlightenment at an early age. He established the Mahudi Jain temple of Ghantakarna Mahavir. He lived in Vijapur and died in Vikram Samvat in 1981 (1925 AD). He was cremated in Vijapur. His samadhi is located behind the government guest home at Vijapur.There is a large jain temple(Sfuling Parshwanath) made under the guidance of jain monk Acharya Shri Subodh Sagar suri who followed the foot steps of Shri Buddhisagar Suri.The premise is also called as Shri Buddhi Sagar Samadhi mandir trust.

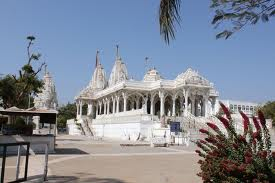
The Jain temple and a memorial shrine where Buddhisagarsuri was cremated in Vijapur.

2. Vijapur is birthplace of famous poet chinu Modi.

== Demographics ==
As of 2001 India census, Vijapur had a population of 25558. Males constitute 52% and females 48%. Vijapur has an average literacy rate of 68%, higher than the national average of 59.5%: male literacy is 75% and female literacy is 60%. In Vijapur, 12% of the population is under 6.

== Notable people ==
- shahi Eidgah mosque
- Chinu Modi
