= Padampura =

Jain temple in Shivdaspura, Rajasthan, India

Padampura Jain Temple
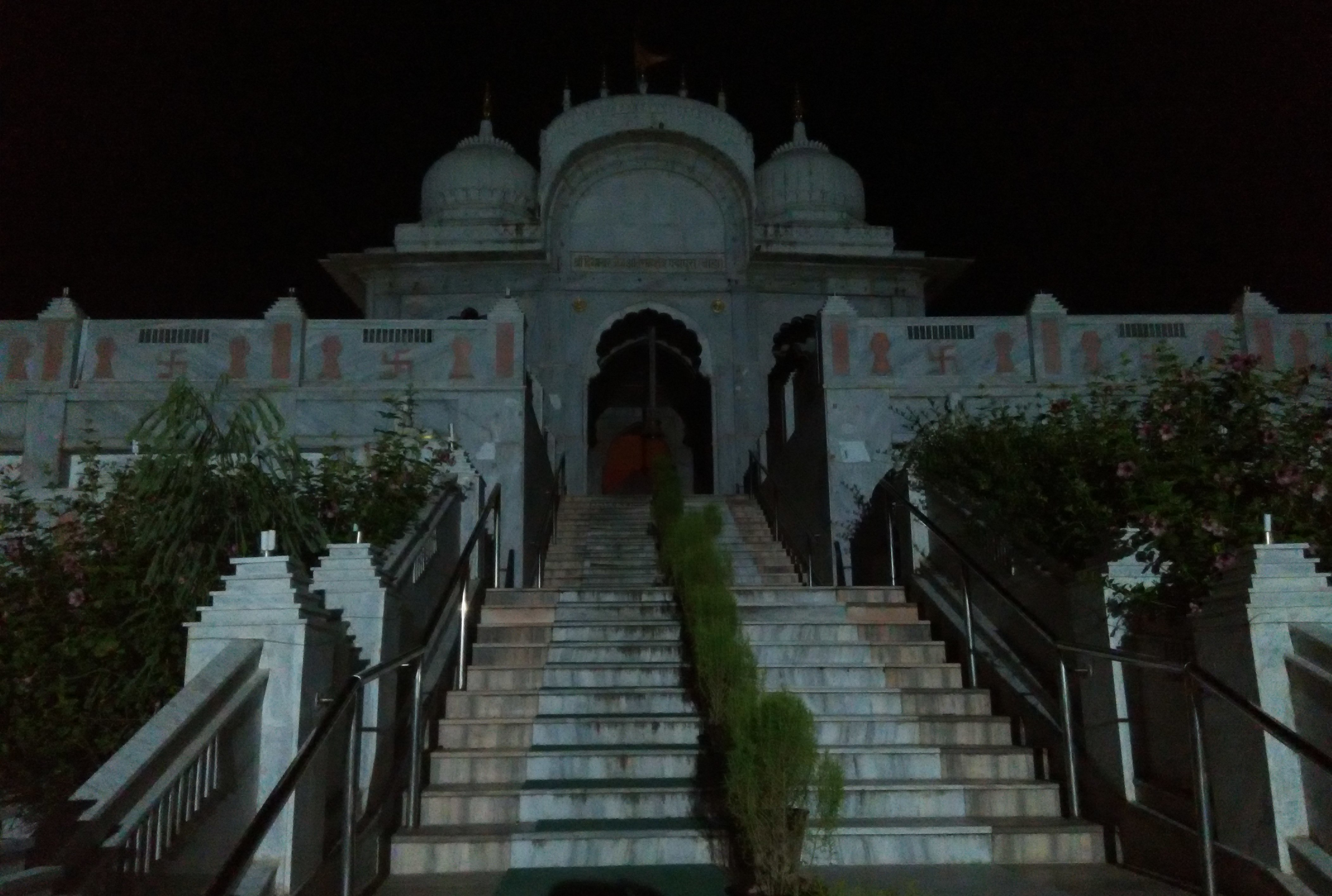
- Padampura Jain Temple

- Location within Rajasthan

Religion
- Affiliation: Jainism
- Sect: Digambara
- Deity: Padmaprabha
- Governing body: Atishay Khetra Padampura Management Committee

Location
- Location: Shivdaspura, Jaipur, Rajasthan
- Coordinates: 26°43′35.04″N 75°56′19.29″E

Architecture
- Creator: Shri Mahorilalji Godha
- Temple: 1

Padampura or Bada Padampura is a Jain temple in Shivdaspura town in Jaipur district of Rajasthan. It is located at a distance of 35 km from Jaipur on Jaipur-Kota road.

== About Padampura ==
Padampura temple is a grand white marble structure spread over 50,000 square feet (4,600 m^{2}). The mulnayak idol of the temple is a red stone idol of Padmaprabha, the 6th Tirthankara, with emblem of lotus. The idol was discovered by a farmer named Moola Jat while digging foundation for constructing his house in 1944 CE.

Padampura temple is a unique Atishaya Kshetra (place of miracles) famous in north India. It is believed that the praying in the shrine cures mental, physical and other affliction. According to Jain beliefs, the Kshetrapala get purges of evil spirit. Since the discovery of the idol the problem of water vanished, death of animals, due to various diseases was stopped and after many years, villagers got a rich crop.

There are eleven vedis inside the temple adorned with idols of Tirthankaras. The temple also features a 61 feet (19 m) manastambha.

So many desires of pilgrims are fulfilled here. It is said that poltergeistic problems or disturbances are solved here simply by visiting (Darshan) of Padamprabhu.

== Main Temple & Idol ==
Mahorilal Godha, a businessman, donated a wide field to construct a circular temple made of marble, with 85 feet high spire. Foundation Stone of this temple was laid by Sir Seth Shri Bhagchandji Soni of Ajmer. An idol of Bhagwan Padamprabhu is installed on a high shrine in the middle of this circular temple and there are 10 more shrines in which idol of Bahubali, Mahavira, Padmaprabhu, Rishabhanatha and Naminatha etc. are installed.

The main attraction of the temple is a 27 feet (8.2 m) colossus of Padamprabha in kayotsarga posture.

== Fair ==
Annual Gatherings Annual Gathering & Festival on Vaishakh Shukla 5, the day of salvation on Falgun Krishna 4. Annual procession & main function at Vijayadashami. The fair is attended by thousands of devotees. During the fair, abhisheka is performed on the main idol.

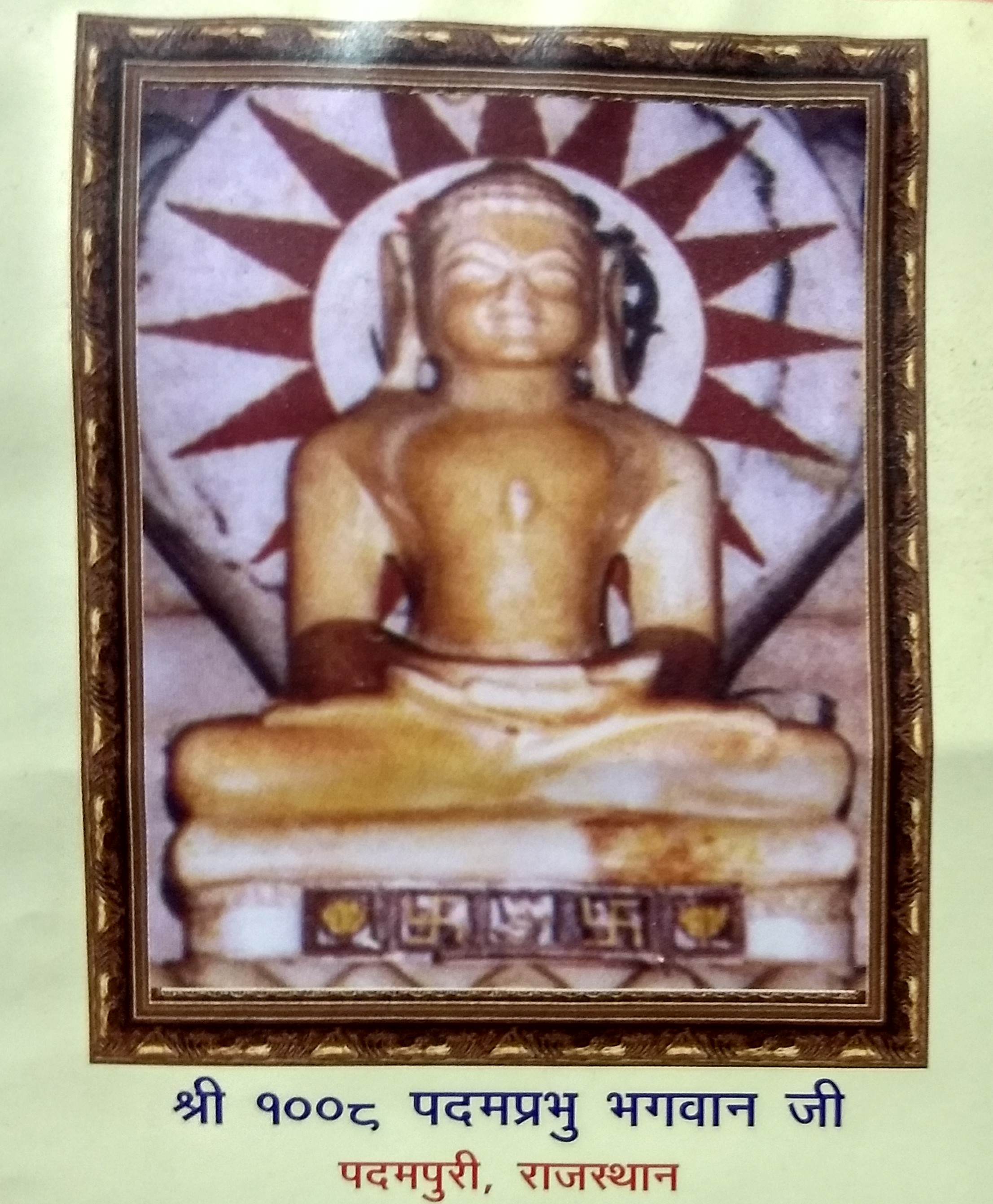
Padmaprabhu main idol

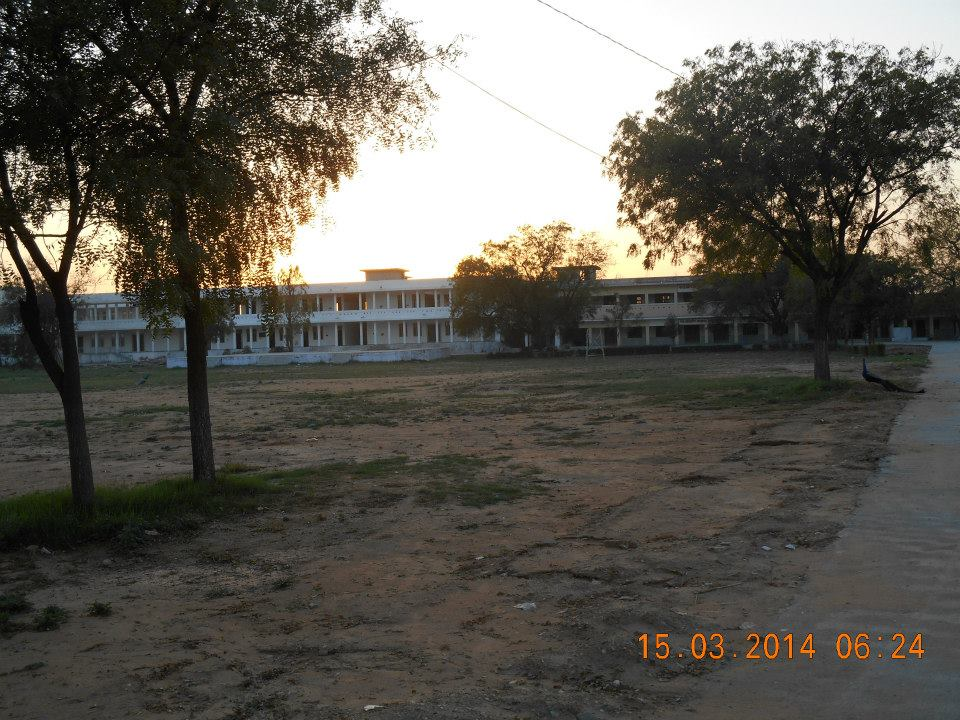
Dharamshala at Padampura Jain temple

== See also ==
- Sanghiji
