= Mandwala =

- village
- Location in Rajasthan, India Mandwala (India)
- Coordinates: 25°26′0″N 72°31′0″E
- Country: India
- State: Rajasthan
- Elevation: 137 m (449 ft)

Population (2001)
  - Total: 6,683

Languages
  - Official: Hindi
- Time zone: UTC+5:30 (IST)
- PIN: 343042
- Telephone code: 02973
- Vehicle registration: RJ-16

Mandwala is a village in Jalore tehsil of Jalore district of Rajasthan state in India. It lies 19 km to the north-west of Jalore town. The village has a government higher secondary school (for girls and boys), and a government hospital. Mandwala is the business hub of nearby villages and its people are known for their entrepreneurship spirit who have made their fortunes in cities like Mumbai, Bangalore, Chennai, Delhi and Hyderabad.

== Temples ==
There is a Jain temple in the village which is almost 75 years old and has a very old idol of Lord Sumatinath. Guru Kalyan Vijayji had consecrated this temple. Its located in the village square

The songiara chauhan of the village have started construction of the kuldevi temple (Maa ashapuri temple) in the village it might require a few years

It has the Jahaj Mandir (a Jain temple built in the shape of a ship).

IIt also has the Baba Ramdevji Temple, Hanumanji Temple, Thakurji Temple (Krishnaji Temple), and many more Hindu temples.

== Transport ==
Nearest airports are at Jodhpur and Udaipur. Nearest railway station is Bishangharh, about 5 km away.
