= Ajol =

- Village
- Location in Gujarat, India Ajol (India)
- Coordinates: 23.487641°N 72.689025°E
- Country: India
- State: Gujarat
- District: Gandhinagar

Population
  - Total: 5,844

Languages
  - Official: Gujarati, Hindi
- Time zone: UTC+5:30 (IST)
- PIN: 382810
- Vehicle registration: GJ
- Website: gujaratindia.com

Ajol is a village in Mansa Taluka of Gandhinagar district, Gujarat, India. It is well known for its silk weaving.

== Demographics ==
As of the 2001 India census, Ajol had a population of 5,844. Males constitute 52% of the population and females 48%. Ajol has an average literacy rate of 82%, higher than the national average of 59.5%: male literacy is 90%, and female literacy is 73%. In Ajol, 11% of the population is under 6 years of age.

== Places of interest ==
The Boria Mahadev temple is popular among followers. Swami Sadashiv Saraswati lived here for a long time. It is believed that he participated in Indian rebellion of 1857. He died here on Kartik Sud 10, Samvat 1999 (1938 AD).
