= Padmaprabha =

Sixth Tirthankara in Jainism

- 6th Jain Tirthankara
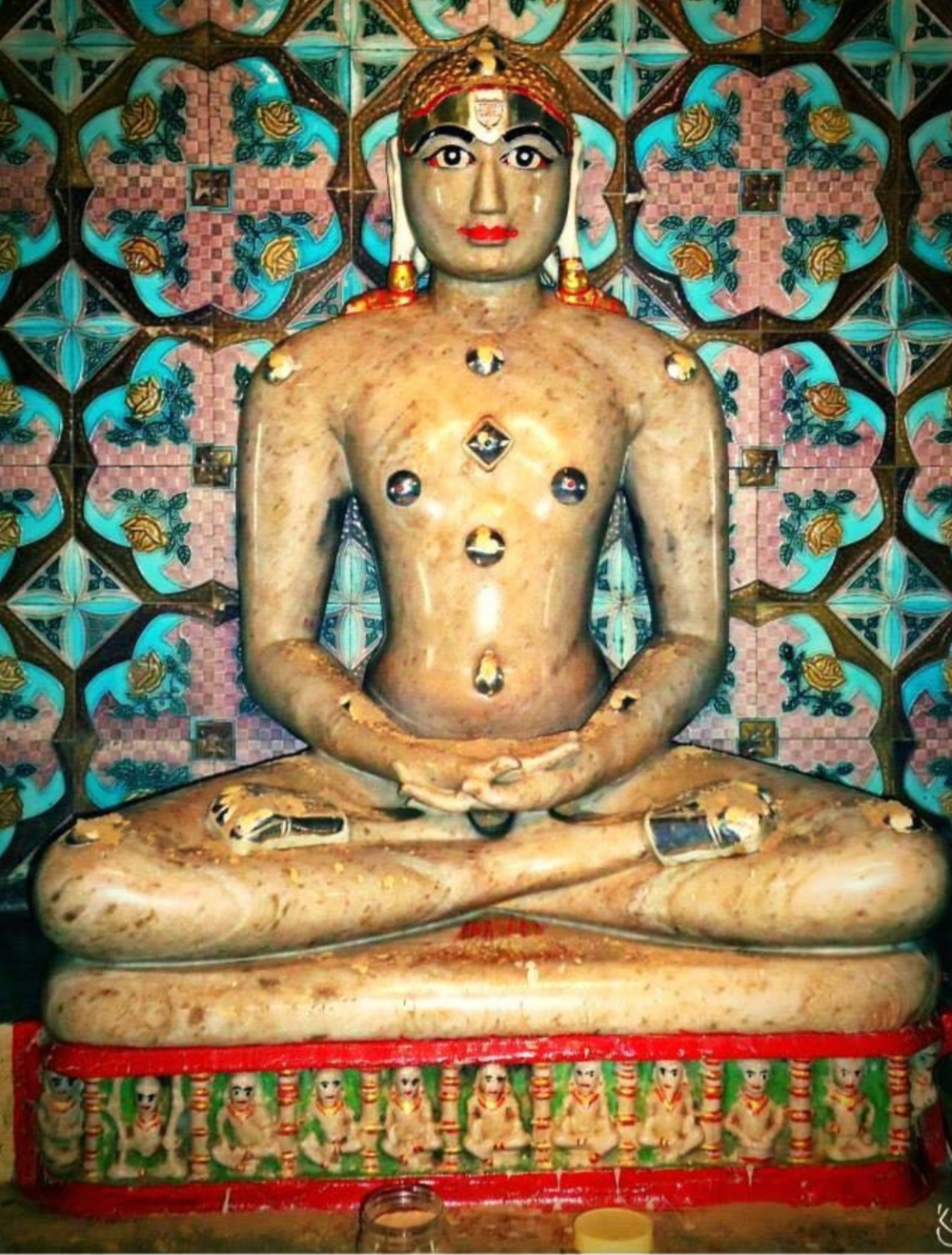
- Idol of Padmaprabha Bhagwan at Laxmani Tirth, Alirajpur, Madhya Pradesh, India
- Other names: Padmaprabhu
- Devanagari: पद्मप्रभ
- Venerated in: Jainism
- Predecessor: Sumatinatha
- Successor: Suparshvanatha
- Symbol: Lotus
- Height: 250 bows (750 meters)
- Age: 3,000,000 purva (211.68 Quintillion years)
- Color: Red

Genealogy
- Born: Kosambi
- Died: Sammed Shikhar
- Parents: Sridhara (Dharana) (father); Susima (mother)
- Dynasty: Ikṣvākuvaṁśa

Padmaprabha (also known as Padmaprabhu) is venerated as the sixth tirthankara (ford-maker) of the current cosmic age (avasarpini). According to Jainism, he was born into the ancient Ikshvaku dynasty to King Sridhara (Dharana) and Queen Susima in the revered city of Kosambi. Following a period of royal life, traditional accounts describe him renouncing his kingdom to become an ascetic, eventually attaining omniscience (Kevala Jnana) beneath a banyan tree. He ultimately achieved spiritual liberation from the cycle of rebirth (moksha) on the sacred peaks of Mount Shikharji in modern-day Jharkhand.

In Jain art and iconography, Padmaprabha is traditionally depicted in a meditative posture with a distinct red physical complexion. He is universally identified by his unique iconographic emblem, the red lotus, which is typically carved onto the pedestal of his idols.

As a foundational spiritual figure, Padmaprabha is actively venerated across the Indian subcontinent. Major architectural monuments and pilgrimage centers dedicated to his worship span multiple regions, including the Laxmani Jain Tirth in Madhya Pradesh, the Padampura Jain Temple near Jaipur, and the prominent Mahudi Jain Temple in Gujarat.

== Life and legends ==
According to Jain tradition, Padmaprabha is venerated as the sixth tirthankara of the present cosmic age (avasarpini). Jain universal history, which charts the progression of his soul, states that in his previous incarnation, he ruled as Maharaja Aparajit in the town of Susima before reincarnating as a heavenly deity in the Graiveyak realm. In his final earthly incarnation, he was born into the ancient Ikshvaku dynasty to King Sridhara and Queen Susima in the city of Kosambi. According to traditional narratives, he received the name "Padmaprabha" (meaning "lotus-like glow") because his mother harbored a strong pregnancy craving to sleep on a bed of lotus flowers, and he was subsequently born with a soft, pinkish-red complexion.

Within the expansive framework of Jain cosmology, texts attribute to him a symbolic lifespan of 3,000,000 purvas and a towering physical height of 250 bows (dhanushas) (750 meters). Following a period of ruling his kingdom, traditional accounts describe him renouncing worldly attachments to become an ascetic. He is said to have attained omniscience (Kevala Jnana) while meditating beneath a banyan tree. Following a long period of preaching the doctrines of Jainism, he ultimately achieved spiritual liberation from the cycle of rebirth (moksha) on the eleventh day of the dark half of the Margashirsha month on the sacred peaks of Mount Shikharji.

Padmaprabha is said to have been born 90,000 crore sagara after his predecessor, Sumatinatha. His successor, Suparsvanatha, is said to have been born 9,000 crore sagara after him.

== Iconography ==
In Jain art and sculpture, Padmaprabha is traditionally depicted in a meditative posture and is distinctly identified by his red physical complexion. He is explicitly recognized by his unique iconographic emblem, the red lotus, which is typically carved or stamped onto the pedestal beneath his idols, as well as his traditional association with the chatrabha tree. As with all tirthankaras, he is depicted alongside his dedicated guardian deities (Shashan-devatas). According to sectarian traditions, his accompanying male guardian deity (yaksha) is identified as Manovega by the Digambara sect and Kusuma (or Mangupta) by the Śvētāmbara sect. Furthermore, traditional iconographic texts identify his female guardian (yakshi) as Manasi in the Digambara tradition and Syama (or Achyuta) in the Śvētāmbara tradition.

== Temples and legacy ==
As the sixth tirthankara, Padmaprabha is widely venerated by the Jain community, resulting in the establishment of several significant pilgrimage centers across the Indian subcontinent.

=== Places of birth and liberation ===
The geographic site of his ultimate spiritual liberation, a dedicated shrine (tonk) housing his venerated footprints (charan) remains a major pan-Indian pilgrimage destination on the sacred peaks of Mount Shikharji in modern-day Jharkhand.

=== Other temples ===
In central India, the Laxmani Jain Tirth located in the Alirajpur district of Madhya Pradesh serves as a major historical shrine dedicated specifically to his worship. In Rajasthan, the Padampura Jain Temple situated near Jaipur operates as a highly revered pilgrimage site, serving as a crucial spiritual anchor for the regional Digambara community.

Further west in Gujarat, the Mahudi Jain Temple in the Gandhinagar district stands as a prominent and historically significant temple complex. It enshrines Padmaprabha as its primary deity (moolnayak) and draws substantial numbers of devotees from the regional Śvētāmbara diaspora.

== Gallery ==
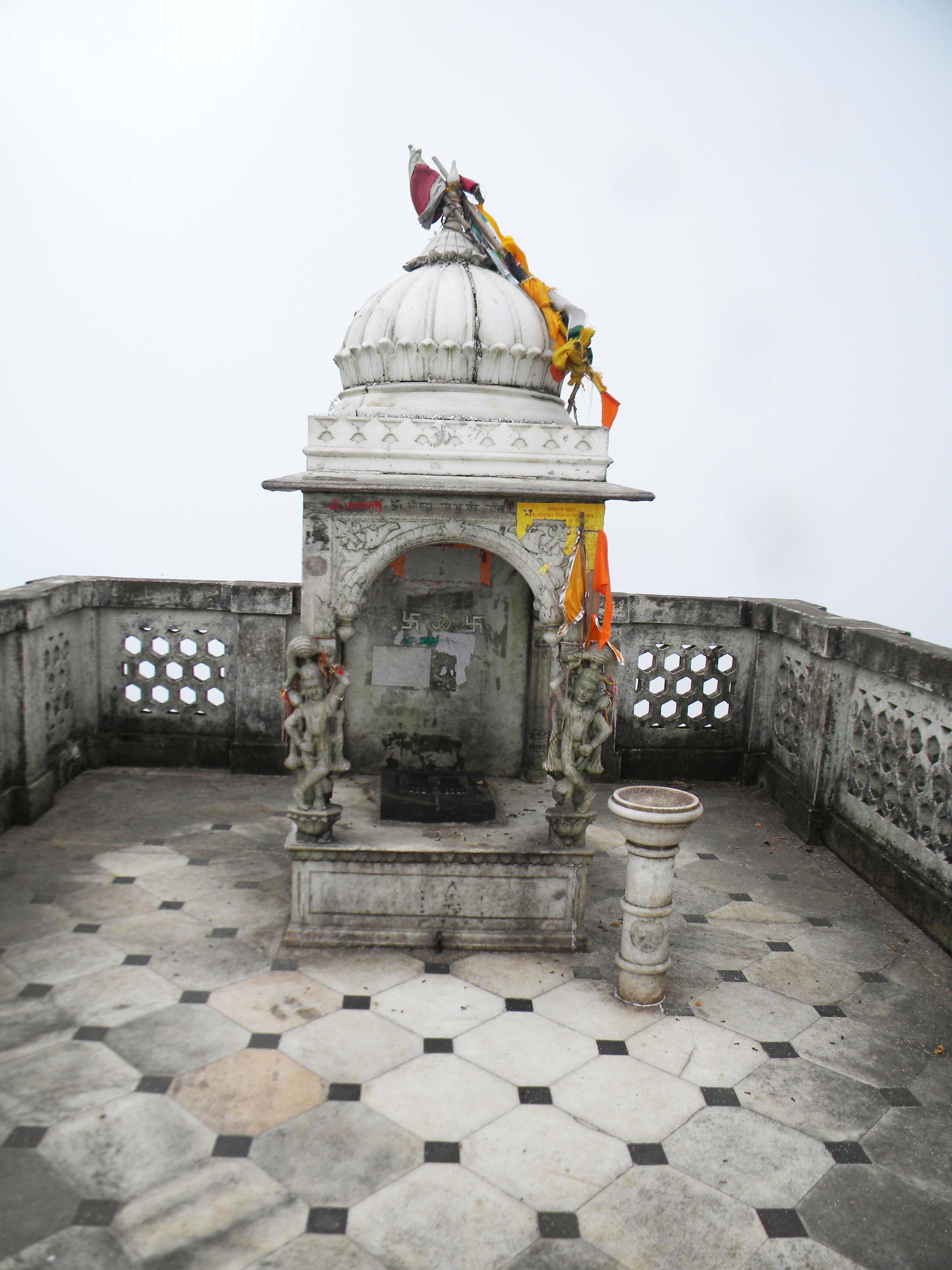
Padmaprabhu Tonk, Shikharji

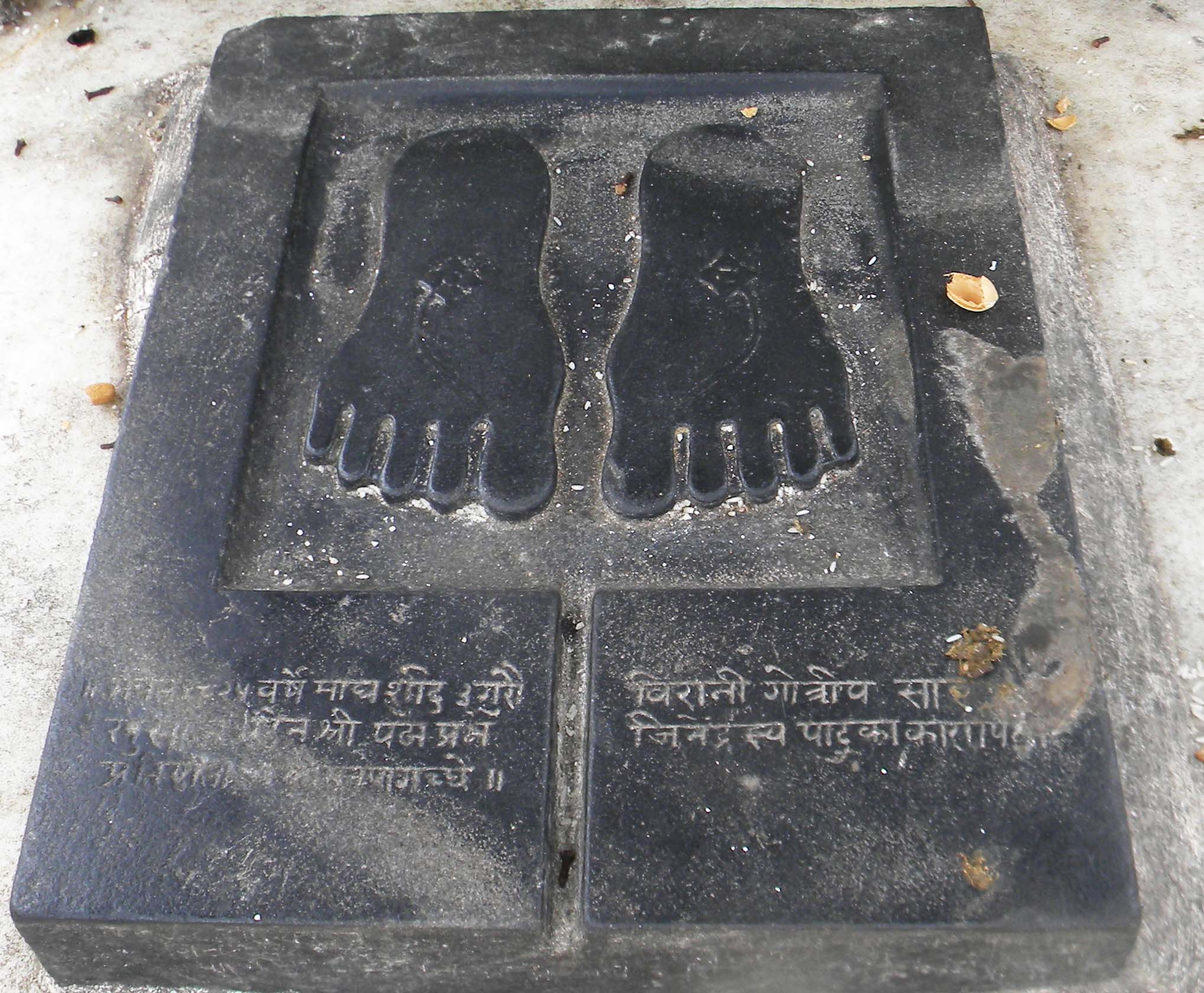
Footprint at Padmaprabhu Tonk, Shikharji

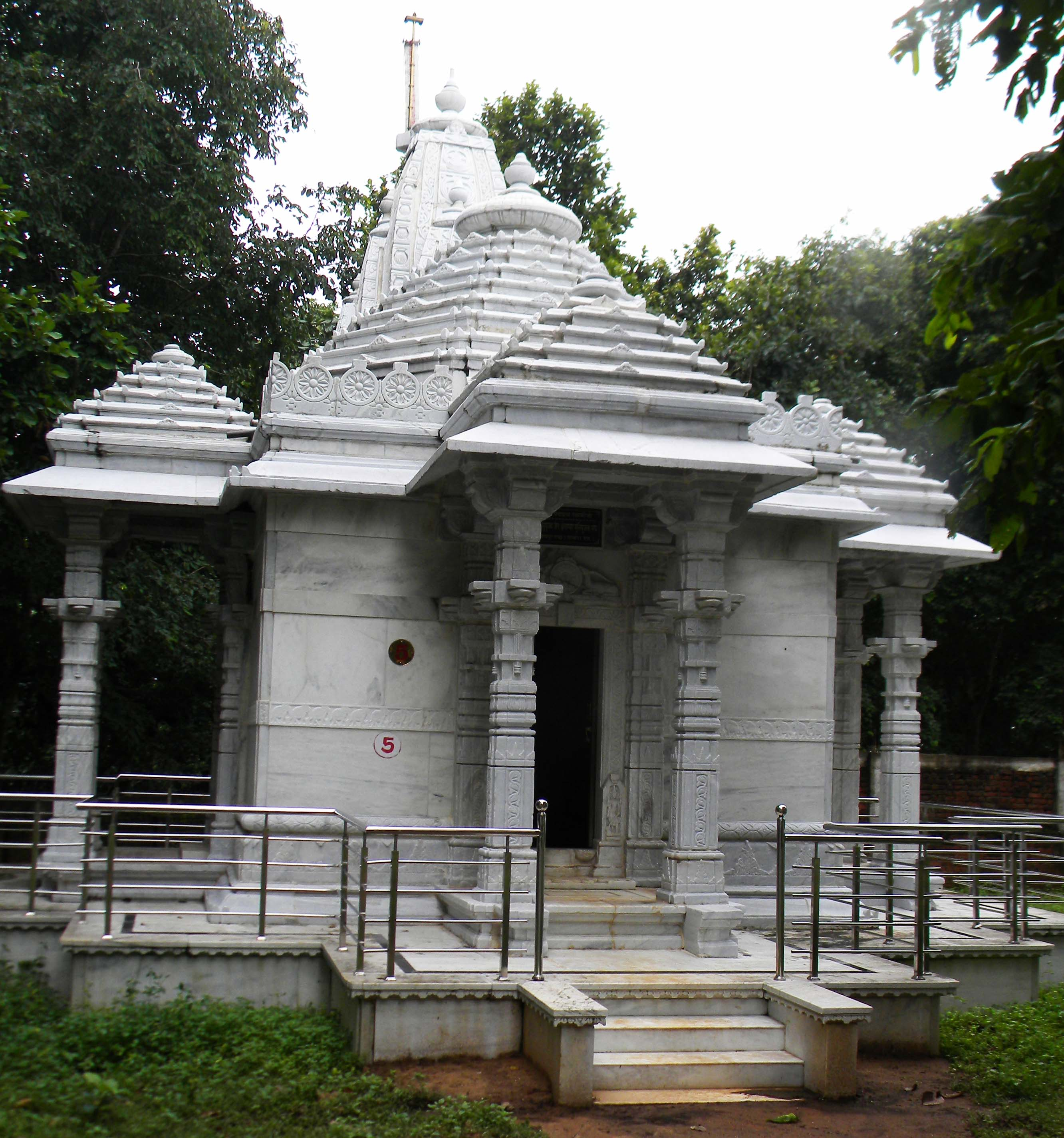
Padmaprabha Temple, Madhuban

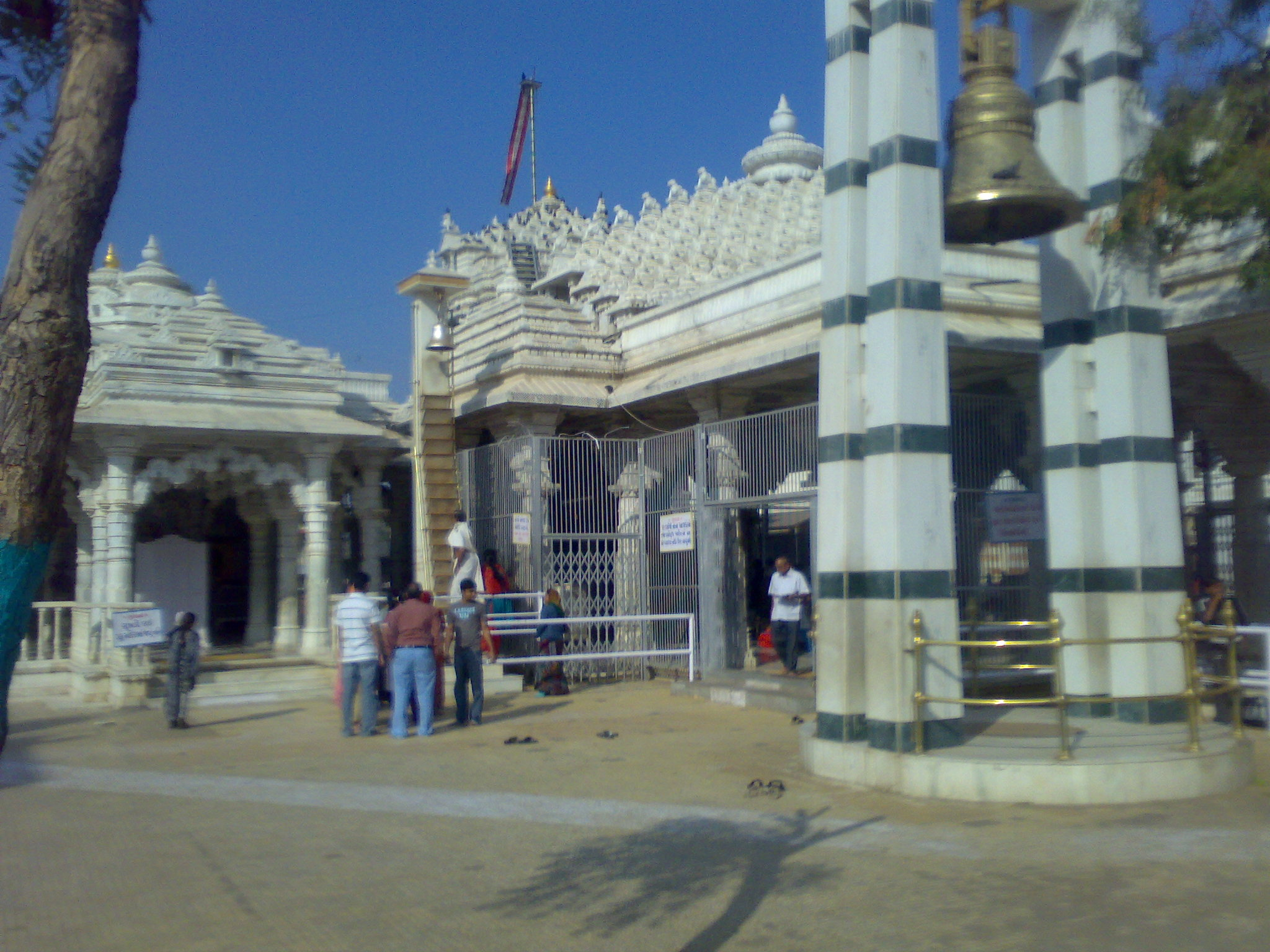
Padmaprabhu Jain Temple at Mahudi

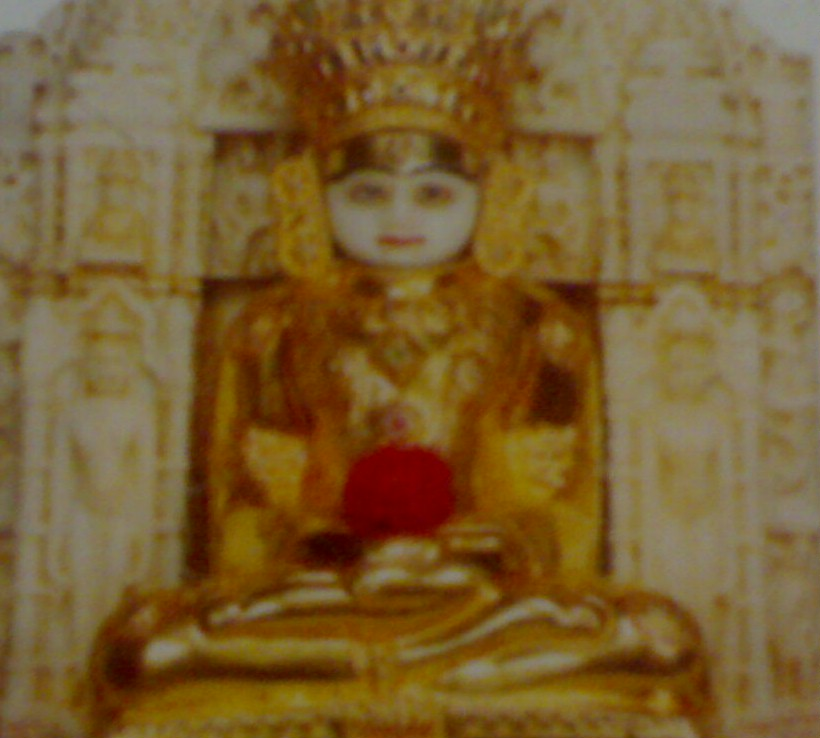
idol at Padmaprabhu Jain Temple at Mahudi

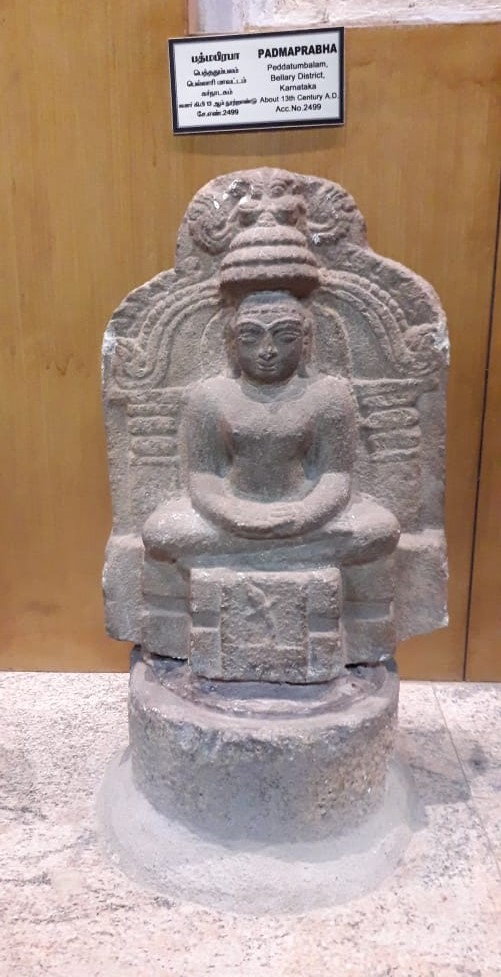
Padmaprabha Tirthankar at Chennai Museum

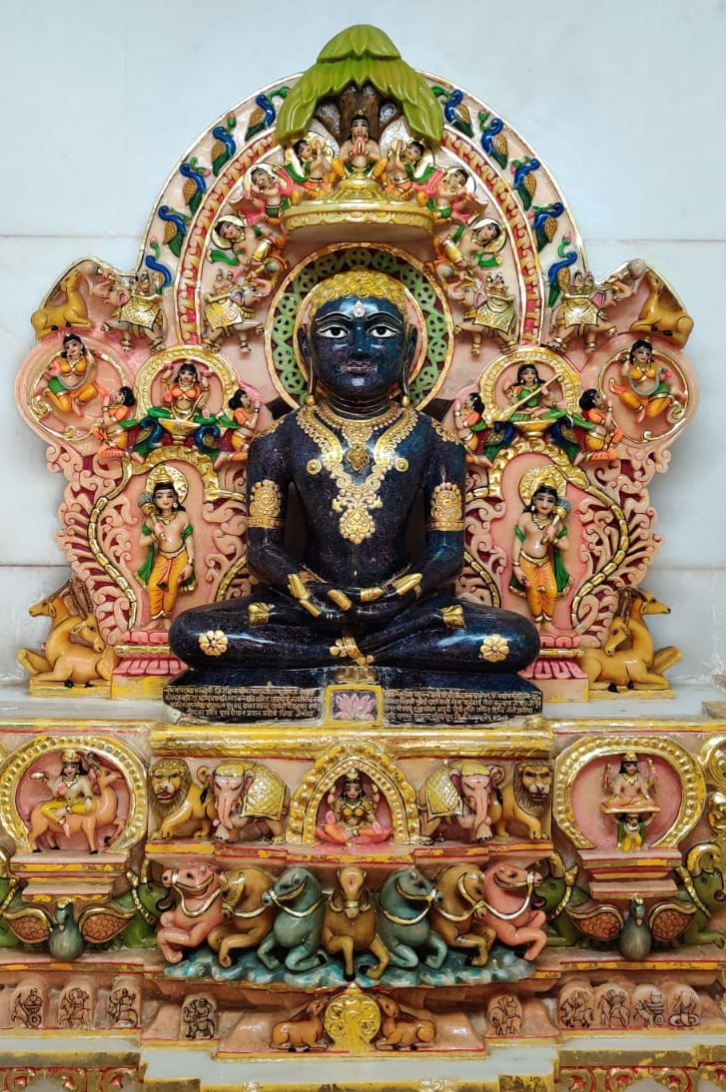
Idol of Padmaprabha made of Semi precious stone at Agashi Jain Temple, Virar, Palghar, Maharashtra

== See also ==
- Arihant (Jainism)
- God in Jainism
- Jainism and non-creationism
