= Buddhisagarsuri =

Indian Jain monk and philosopher (1874–1925)

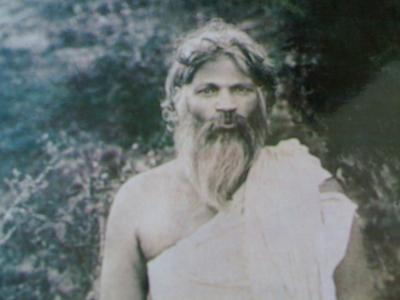
- Buddhisagar Suri

Personal life
- Born: Bechardas Patel; 1874 Vijapur
- Died: 1925 (aged 50–51) Vijapur

Religious life
- Religion: Jainism
- Sect: Śvetāmbara

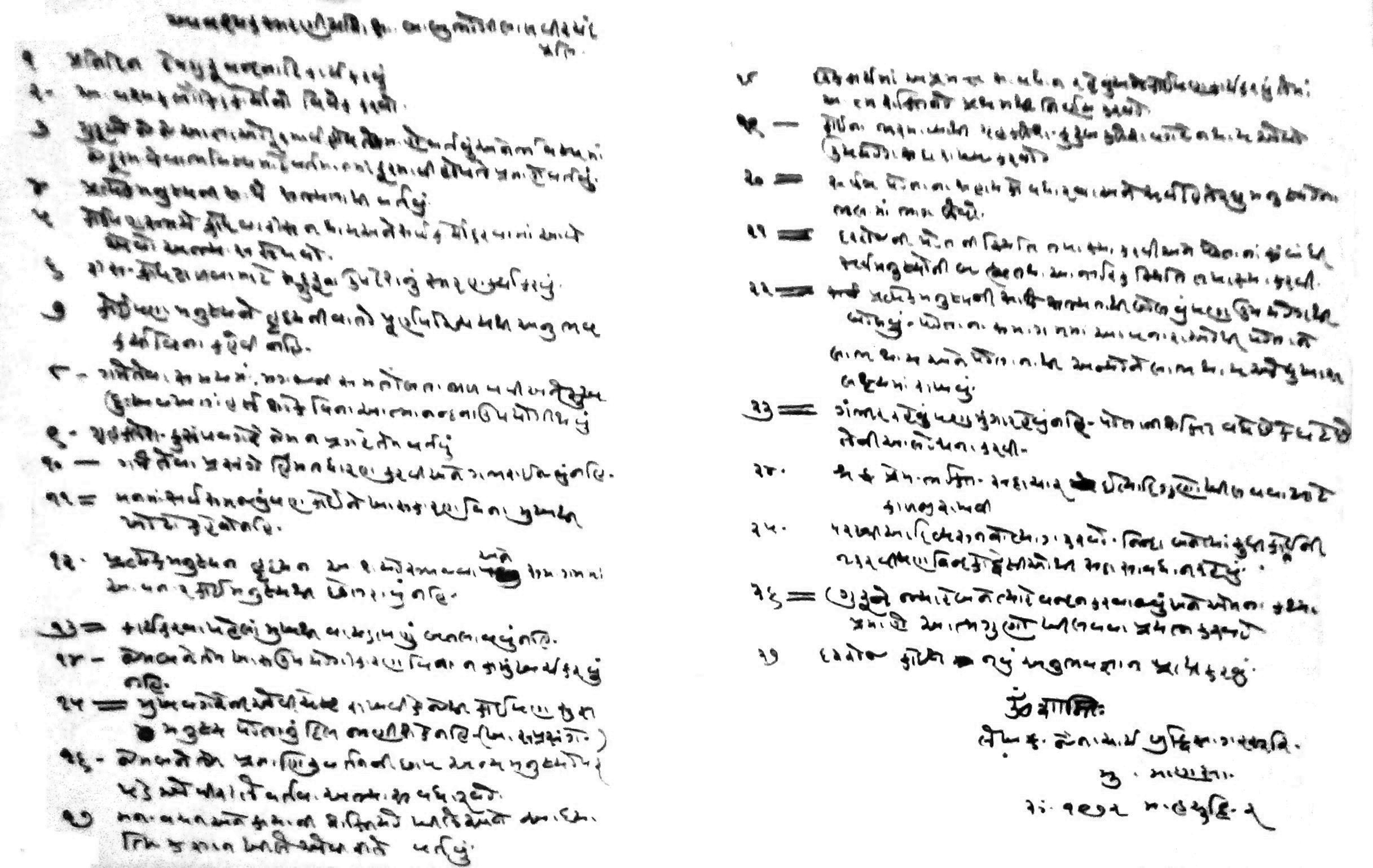
Handwritten Text of Buddhisagar Suri. It lists rules to be followed by Jain lay men. Gujarati language script. Samvat 1972 (1915 AD approx.)

Buddhisagarsuri (1874 – 1925) was a Jain ascetic, philosopher and author from British India. Born in a Hindu family, he was influenced by a Jain monk and later was initiated in asceticism, and later elevated to the title of Acharya. He wrote more than a hundred books.

== Biography ==
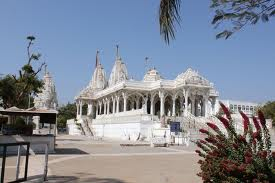
The Jain temple and a memorial shrine where Buddhisagarsuri was cremated in Vijapur.

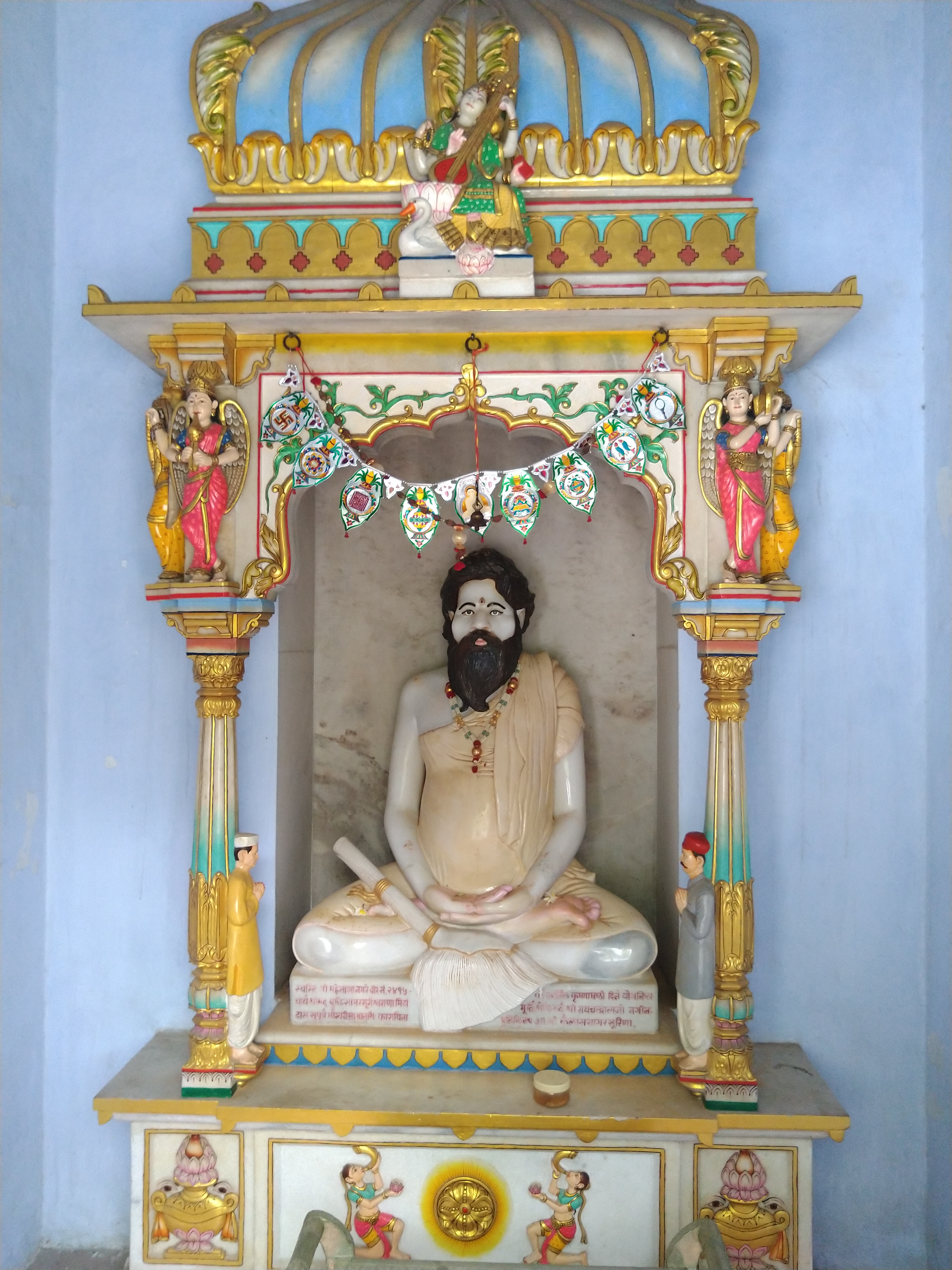
Statue of Buddhisagarsuri in a shrine at Dadawadi Jain temple in Mehsana

Buddhisagarsuri was born Bechardas Patel in a Hindu family of Shivabhai and Ambaben in 1874 at Vijapur in north Gujarat. He studied till sixth standard. He met Muni Ravisagar, a Jain monk, and became his disciple. He studied at the Yashovijayji Jain Sanskrit Pathshala, a school for religious studies, in Mehsana. He took a job of religious teacher in Ajol. Following the death of Ravisagar in 1898, his spiritual quest intensified. Ravisagar's disciple, Sukhsagar initiated him as a Jain monk in 1901. He was given a new name, Muni Buddhisagar. He was conferred with an informal title of Yoga-nishtha, literally "firm in Yoga". He was elevated to the title of Acharya in 1914 in Mansa. He established the Mahudi Jain temple in 1917. He was invited by the royals of Baroda, Idar and Pethapur to preach there. He died at Vijapur in 1925. The Jain temple and a memorial shrine were built where Buddhisagarsuri was later cremated in Vijapur.

== Works ==
He wrote more than a hundred books. He wrote about 2,000 poems, including a large number of poems about Sabarmati River. His first book was Jain Dharma Khristi Dharmano Mukablo, a comparison between Jainism and Christianity. He criticised Christianity and its missionary activities in Gujarat.

He was involved in several debates regarding icon worship during those time. He defended it and authored a booklet Jain Sutroma Murtipuja (Icon Worship in Jain Scriptures). He termed icons as a form of love and devotion.

=== Selected works ===
- Samadhi Shatak, a hundred stanzas on meditation
- Yog Deepak, the guide on yoga
- Dhyan Vichar, a book on meditation
- Adhyatma Shanti, a work on spiritual peace
- Karmayog, a theory of karma
- Adhyatma Geeta
- Atma Shakti Prakash
- Atma Darshan
- Shuddhopayog
- Samya Shatak
- Shishyopanishad
- Atmana Shasan
- Anandghan Pad Bhavarth Sangrah, a collection of hymns of Anandghan, a Jain mystic poet, and its meaning
- Shrimad Devchandraji, a biography of Devchandra
- Kumarapala Charitra, a biography of Chaulukya, ruler of Kumarapala
- Yashovijay Charitra, a biography of Yashovijay
- Adhyatma Bhajan Sangrah 1–14, a collection of songs

== Commemoration ==
The Union Home Minister, Amit Shah, released a ₹150 commemorative coin to mark the 150th Birth Anniversary of Buddhisagar Suri at Auda Auditorium, Shela, Ahmedabad, on 9 March 2025.

== See also ==
- Swayamprabhasuri
- Vimalsuri
- Kalapurnasuri
