= Naraka Chaturdashi =

Hindu festival

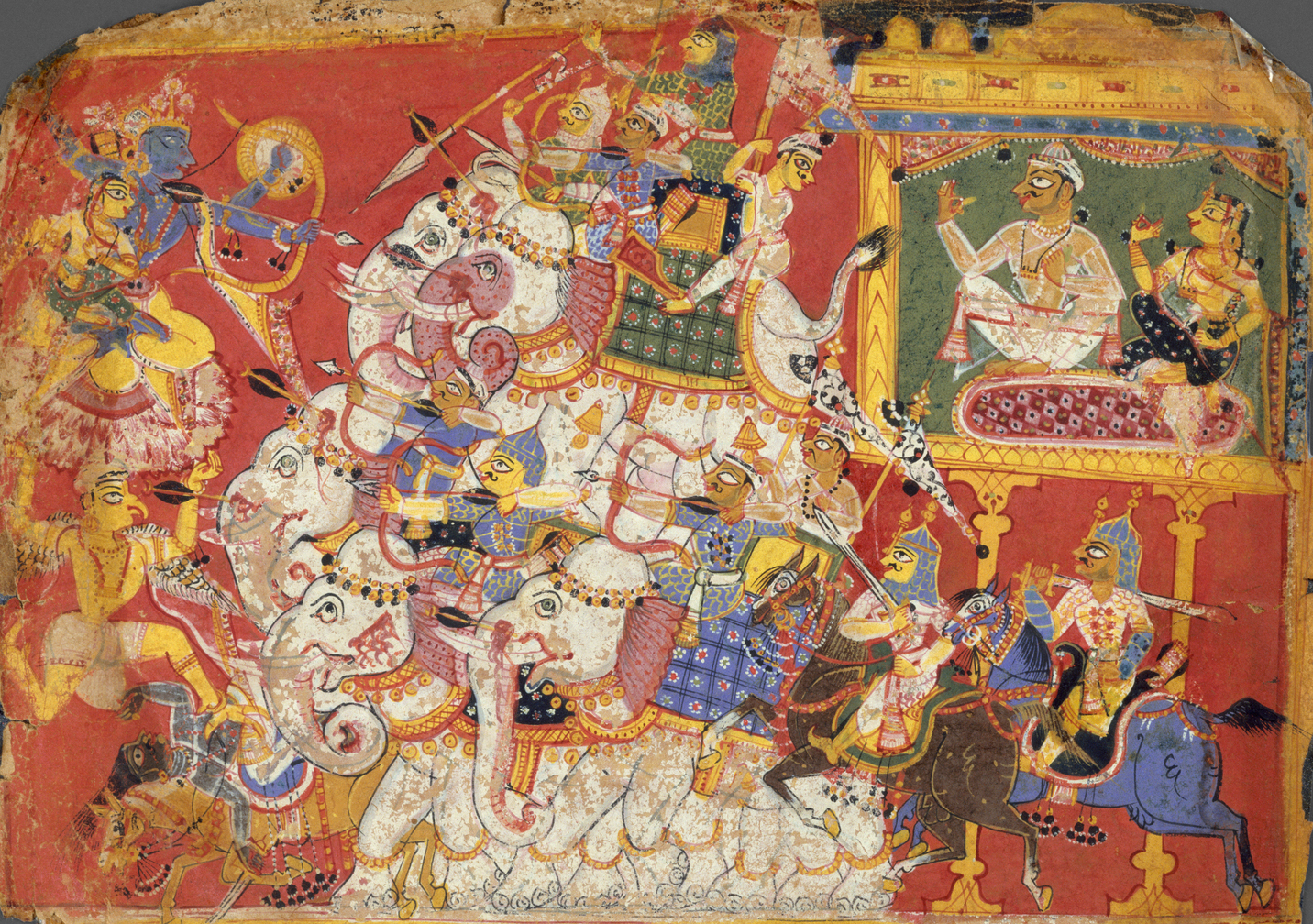
- Painting of Krishna and Satyabhama fighting Narakasura
- Observed by: Hindus
- Type: Religious
- Significance: Commemoration of the victory of Krishna and Satyabhama over Narakasura
- Observances: Prayers, religious rituals
- Date: 29 Ashvin (amanta tradition); 14 Kartika (purnimanta tradition)
- 2026 date: November 7
- Frequency: annual

Explanatory note on Hindu festival dates
- The Hindu calendar is lunisolar but most festival dates are specified using the lunar portion of the calendar. A lunar day is uniquely identified by three calendar elements: māsa (lunar month), pakṣa (lunar fortnight) and tithi (lunar day). Furthermore, when specifying the masa, one of two traditions are applicable, viz. amānta / pūrṇimānta. If a festival falls in the waning phase of the moon, these two traditions identify the same lunar day as falling in two different (but successive) masa. A lunar year is shorter than a solar year by about eleven days. As a result, most Hindu festivals occur on different days in successive years on the Gregorian calendar.

Naraka Chaturdashi (Note: Also known as Kali Chaudas, Narak Chaudas, Narak Nivaran Chaturdashi, Roop Chaudas, Choti Diwali, and Bhoot Chaturdashi) (Sanskrit: नरकचतुर्दशी, romanized: Narakacaturdaśī) is an annual Hindu festival that falls on the chaturdashi (the 14th day) of the Krishna Paksha in the Hindu calendar month of Ashvin (according to the amanta tradition) or Kartika (according to the purnimanta tradition). It is the second day of the five-day long festival of Diwali (also known as Deepavali). Hindu literature narrates that the asura (demon) Narakasura was slain on this day by Krishna and Satyabhama. The day is celebrated by early morning religious rituals, followed by festivities.

== Legend ==
In the Kalika Purana, Narakasura is described as the son of the earth goddess Bhumi and the Varaha avatar of Vishnu. He conquered the region of Pragjyotisha and was installed as its king by Vishnu. Initially a wise and virtuous ruler, he grew corrupt by the influence of Banasura and started to oppress his subjects.

According to the Bhagavata Purana, Narakasura terrorised the three worlds and invaded Svarga, the realm of the devas. Unable to resist, the devas watched as Naraka seized the earrings of Aditi, the mother of Indra, and abducted 16,100 maidens from the heavens and the earth, carrying them away to Pragjyotisha. Hearing of Narakasura's exploits from Indra, Krishna, accompanied by his consort Satyabhama, mounted Garuda and flew to Pragjyotisha. The divine couple fought the asuras in battle, slaying a number of Narakasura's prominent commanders. Narakasura eventually entered the battlefield himself. Following a fierce clash, Krishna slew Naraka with his Sudarshana Chakra, and the divine weapon he had bestowed upon the asura, the Narayanastra, was granted to his heir, Bhagadatta.

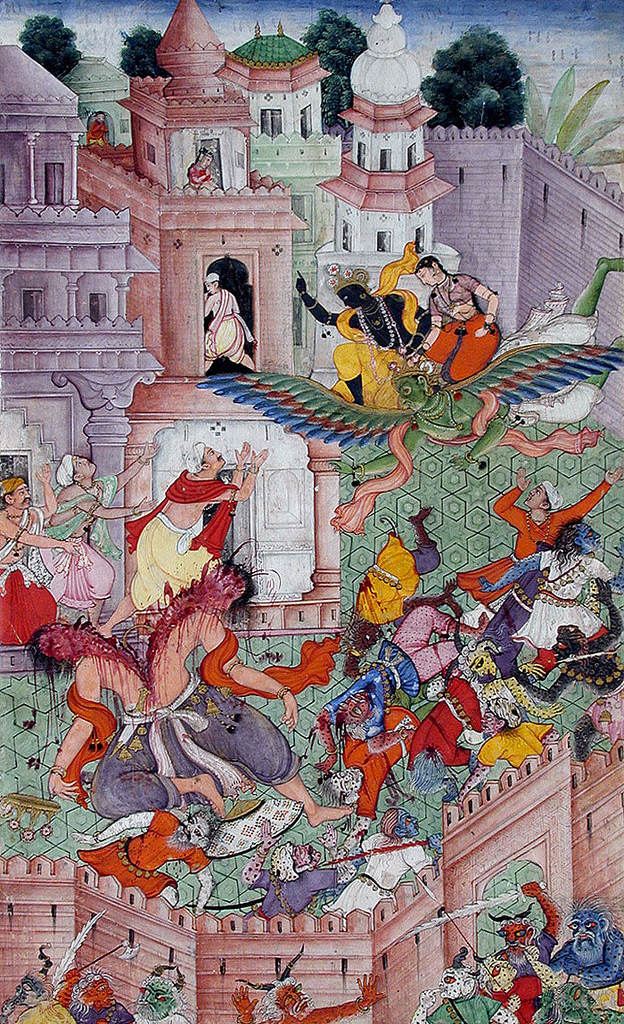
Krishna decapitates Narakasura with his discus

== Observances ==
Observances for Naraka Chaturdashi begin before sunrise on the chaturdaśī tithi (fourteenth lunar day). Adherents take an oil bath, massaging the head and body with sesame or medicated oils and sometimes applying a herbal paste. Devotees then wear clean clothes, share a breakfast with relatives, and prepare special sweet dishes for the midday meal. In the evening, houses are lit with oil lamps and firecrackers are burst.

=== Regional traditions ===
In Tamil Nadu, the start of Deepavali is marked on Naraka Chaturdashi. Celebrations begin before sunrise with traditional oil baths, prayer rituals, and fireworks. Some homes observe nombu (fasting rites) and perform Lakshmi Puja. In parts of South India, the day is also called Deepavali Bhogi.

In Karnataka and Maharashtra, the day is marked with early morning traditional oil baths and prayer rituals, followed by fireworks. Celebrations extend through Bali Padyami, the main day of Diwali in these regions, when cows are decorated and worshipped.

In Goa, paper-made effigies of Narakasura, filled with grass and firecrackers symbolising evil, are made. These effigies are burnt early in the morning, firecrackers are burst, and people return home to take a scented oil bath. The women of the house perform aarti for the men, gifts are exchanged, a kareet (bitter berry) is crushed under the feet in token of killing Narakasura, symbolising the removal of evil and ignorance. Different varieties of poha and sweets are made and eaten with family and friends.

In West Bengal and Bangladesh, the day before Kali Puja is observed as Bhoot Chaturdashi. Adherents believe that the souls of deceased ancestors visit their living relatives on this night. Fourteen diyas (oil lamps) are lit throughout the home to guide ancestral spirits and ward off evil spirits, ensuring every dark corner is illuminated.

In Rajasthan and Gujarat, the festival is also called Kali Chaudas, where kali means dark and chaudas means fourteenth. A head wash and applying kajal (kohl) to the eyes are traditionally believed to ward off the kali nazar (evil eye). The god of death, Yama, is also worshipped on this day by lighting a lamp which is believed to protect one from evil. A puja is performed with oil, flowers, and sandalwood. Coconuts are also offered to Hanuman alongside a prasada of sesame seeds, jaggery, and rice flakes (poha) with ghee and sugar.

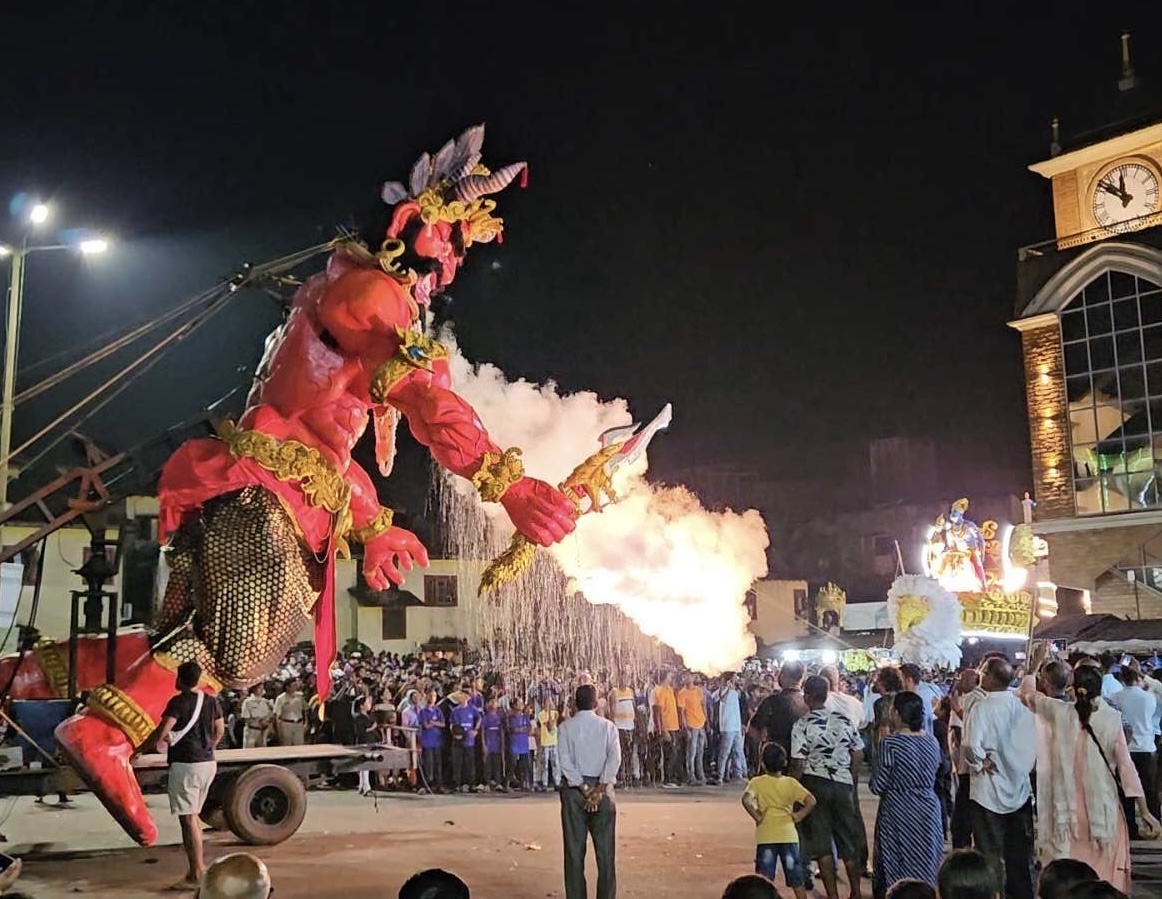
Narakasura effigy in Goa constructed from bamboo made skeleton and paper, then painted with fierce expressions accompanied by pyrotechnics.

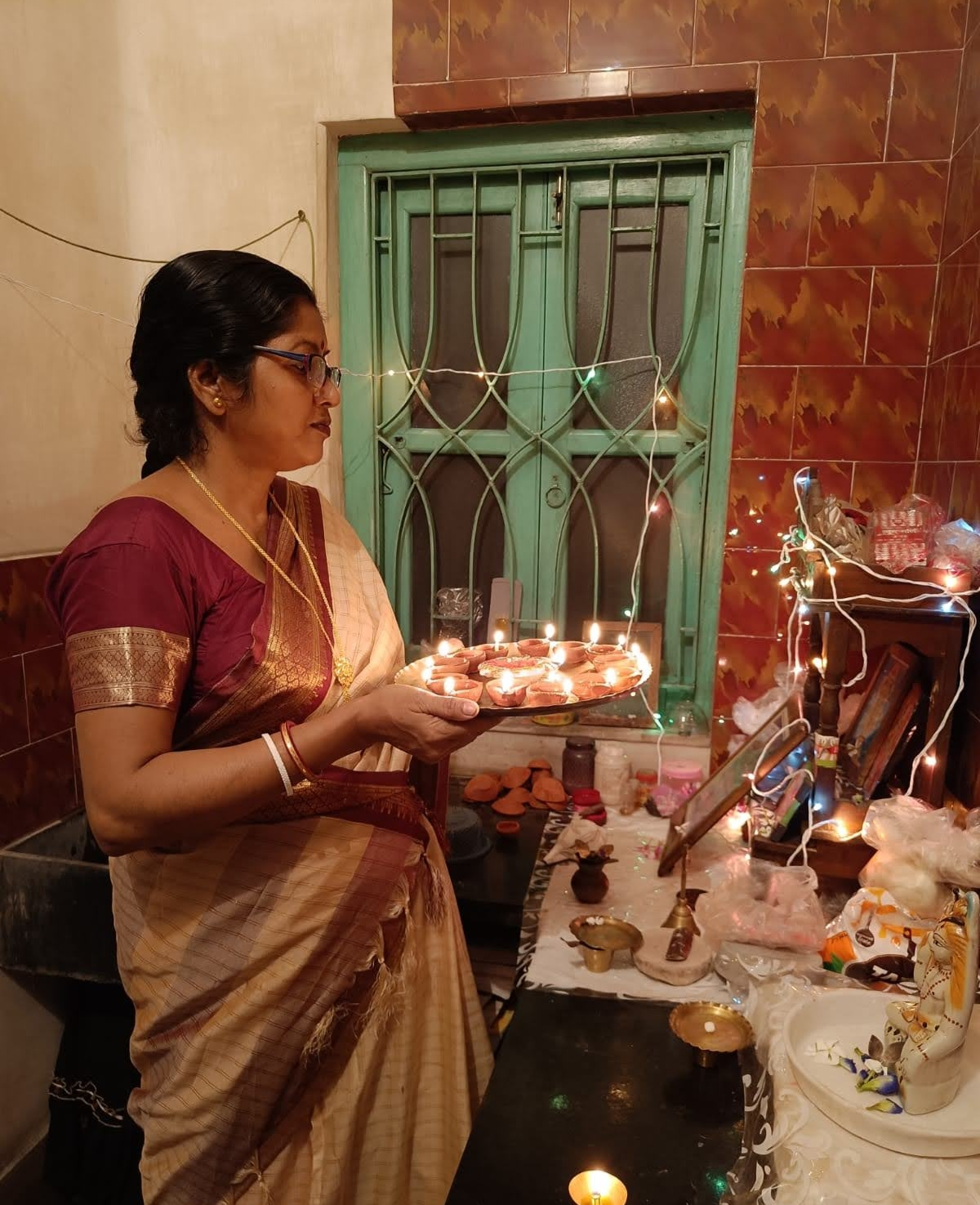
Bhoot Chaturdashi is celebrated in Bengal. Fourteen pradips (diyas) are lighted in this occasion.
