= Sukhdi =

Indian confectionery

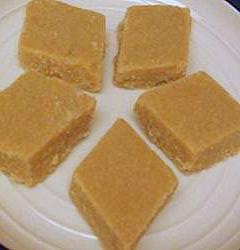
- Type: Confectionery
- Place of origin: India
- Region or state: Gujarat
- Main ingredients: Wheat flour, jaggery, ghee

Sukhdi is an Indian sweet made from wheat flour and jaggery in ghee. Sukhdi is a staple snack like biscuits available in most of the Gujarati households. It is also cooked on auspicious days or on festivals. Originally from Gujarat, it is also cooked in Rajasthan. It is also known as gorpapdi.

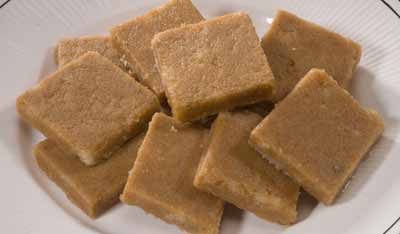
Sukhadi / Sukhdi

== Ingredients and method ==
Sukhdi is made from Ghee (clarified butter), whole wheat flour and jaggery. The whole wheat flour is roasted in ample amount of ghee till it turns aromatic and brownish. Grated jaggery, in equal amount of flour is added to the mixture after removing pan from the heat, and stirred to make a mixture that is transferred to a plate to set. After making level of the mixture, pieces are created.

=== Nutrition ===
As all three ingredients are high in calories, favored by children in the Gujarat and Rajasthan regions.
