= Shrimal Jain =

Ancient Jain community

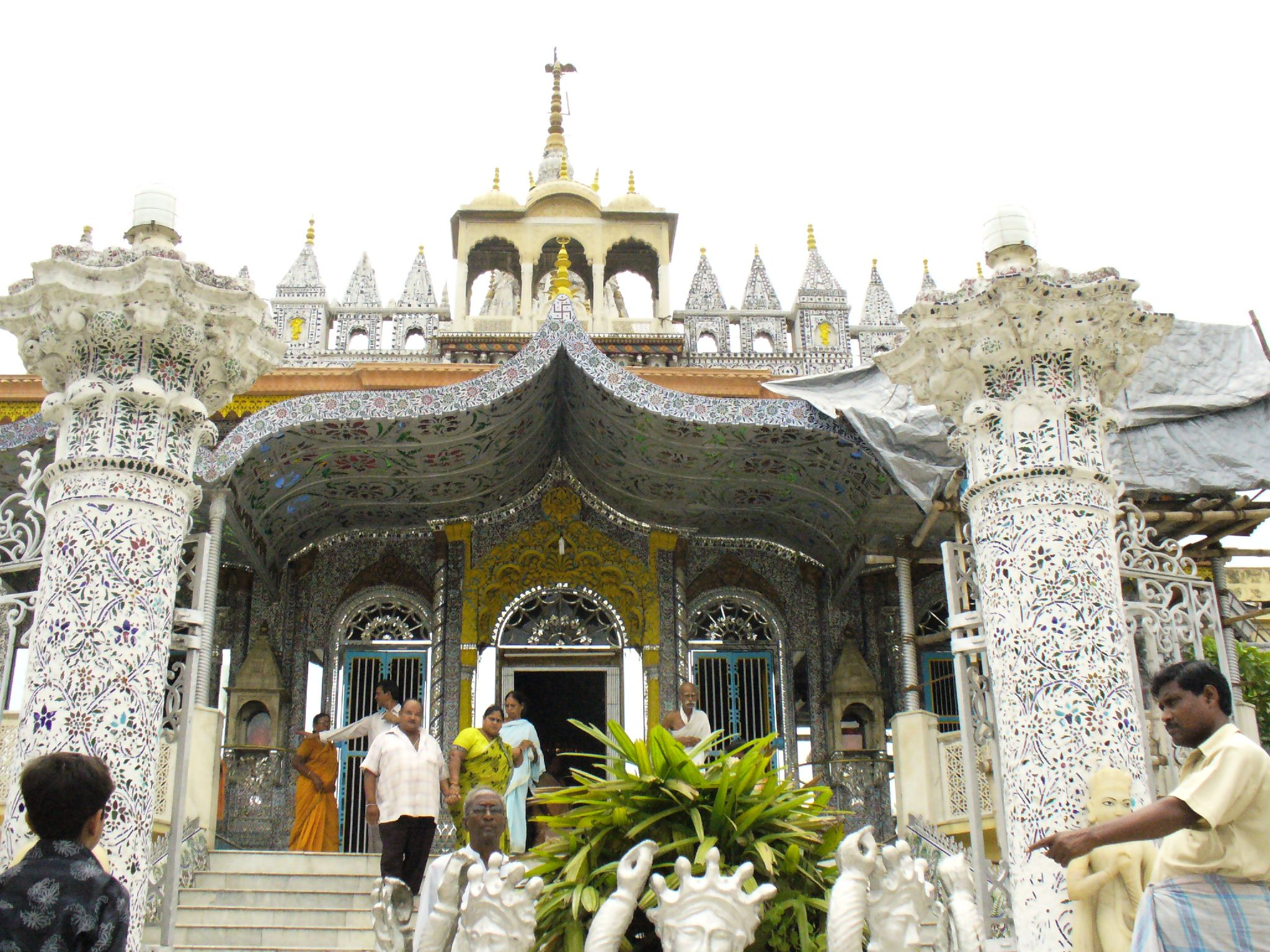
Calcutta Jain Temple

Shrimal (Srimal) Jain is an ancient Jain community, originally from Rajasthan, Shrimal or Bhinmal town in southern Rajasthan. They were traditionally wealthy merchants and money lenders and were prominent ministers at the court of Rajput kings as treasurers and ministers, holding the titles of Dewan or Durbari. Descendants of this caste are well known for business acumen and are in possession of Havelis and mansions given to them as gifts from kings for their service as royal treasurers, ministers, courtiers and advisors.

== Creation of the Śrīmali clan ==
Jain scriptural accounts of Acharya Swayamprabhasuri's life describe his visit to Rajasthan 57 years after Mahavira's nirvana which was in 527 BCE. This would date his visit to Śrīmal in 470 BCE. Most of the non-canonical texts of the Śvetāmbara sect agree upon this account and describe him as one of the first few Jain monks to visit Rajasthan. Following is a brief scriptural account of the establishment of the Śrīmali clan by Swayamprabhasuri.

In Maru Pradesh (modern-day Rajasthan), monks neither of Jainism, nor of Buddhism had preached due to the difficult terrain (desert). Brahmins had a monopoly in this part of India. It is said that practices of Kundapanth and Caliyapanth, branches of Tantric Hinduism, were very popular. It is believed that they promoted several tantric malpractices in the name of religion. It is further stated that Śrīmal (modern-day Bhinmal), a town in Rajasthan, was at the center of such practices.

Once, Swayamprabhasuri was wandering with his disciples near Mount Abu for the first time after visiting Palitana temples. Several merchants from Śrīmal visited Mount Abu for business. Some of them happened to come across Swayamprabhasuri's sermons on non-violence. They insisted upon him to visit Śrīmal to end such malpractices. Later, he visited Śrīmal where preparations for an Ashvamedha Yagya were being made. Several animals were readied for sacrifice. When his disciples went out to beg for food, they returned without any food stating that only meat being cooked at all households they went to and that they could not find food 'free from 42 faults' in the town.

Upon hearing this, Swayamprabhasuri immediately went to King Jayasen's palace where Brahmins were preparing for the animal sacrifice. The king welcomed him and asked about the reason for his visit. Swayamprabhasuri clearly stated the Jain principle of "Ahimsa parmo dharma" (transl. non-violence is the first act of righteousness). Interrupting his sermon, the Brahmin leader for the sacrificial ritual told the king that Jains do not follow the Vedas and must not be heeded to. However, Swayamprabhasuri stayed determined on his point and a lengthy debate followed. Swayamprabhasuri emerged victorious in the debate and King Jayasen, along with 90000 households of the town turned towards non-violence and eventually, Jainism after Swayamprabhasuri preached them about the 12 vows for householders.

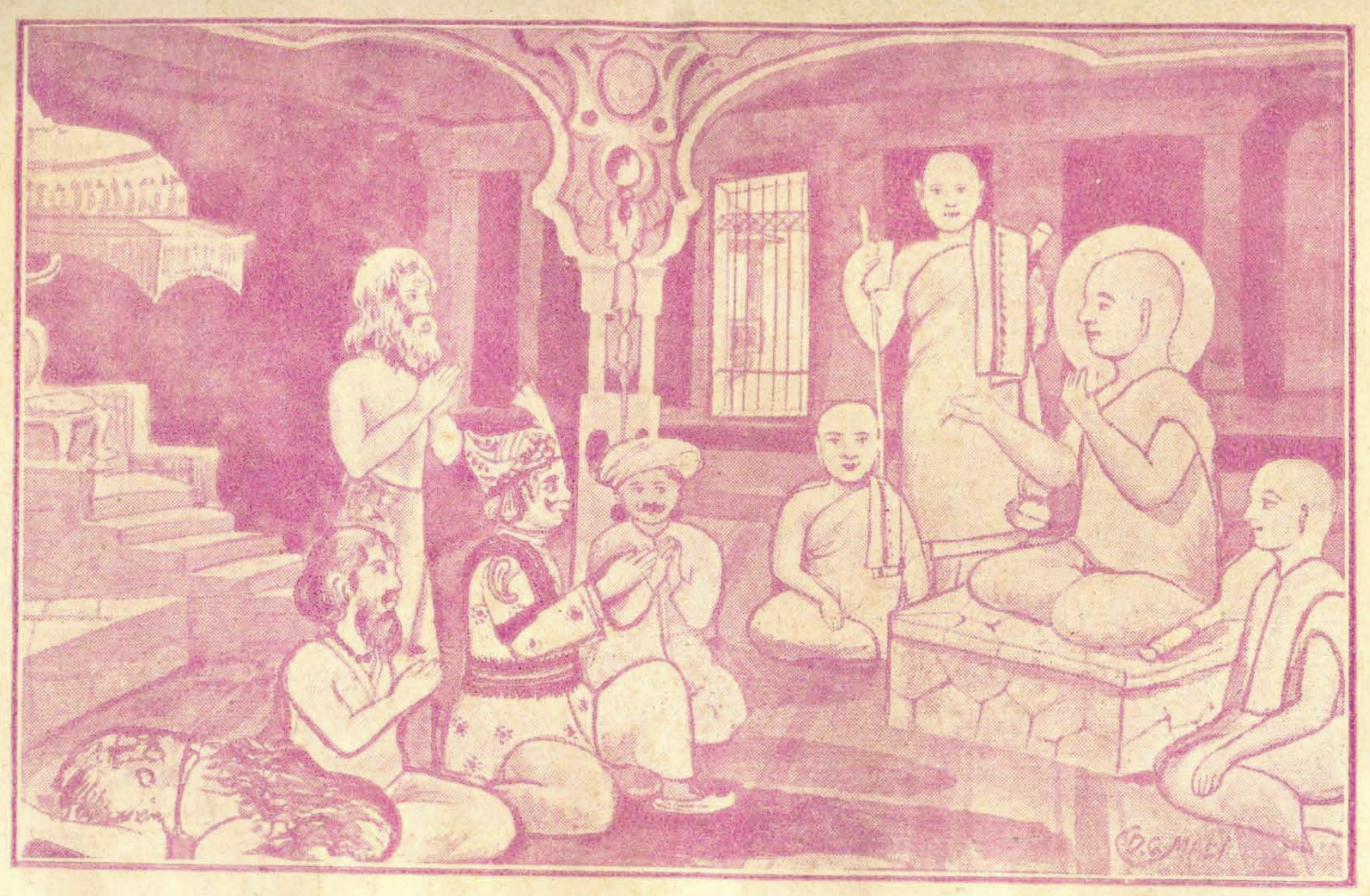
Swayamprabhasuri delivering a sermon in the court of King Jayasena of Srimal

Later on, residents of this large town moved to various parts of Rajasthan and their clan was named Śrīmali after their hometown Śrīmal.

It is believed that Swayamprabhasuri consecrated a temple and an idol of the 1st Tirthankara Rishabhanatha at Śrīmal. A pilgrimage procession to Palitana temples was also organized by the Jain Sangha at Śrīmal. It is further stated that they also renovated Jain temples at Mount Abu.

== Parasnath Temple ==
The Court Jewelers to the Viceroy and Governor General of British India built Calcutta Jain Temple, Parasnath Temple, in 1867. It is built in Belgian glass. It is also known as Mookim's temple garden.

== Prominent Shrimals ==
- Rai Badridas Bahadoor Mukeem was son of Kalkadas Mukeem. He migrated from Lucknow to Kolkata. He built Jain temples in Sammet Shikhar and Purimatal (Allahabad).
- Thakkar Pheru of Delhi, author of 14th century texts on precious metals and gems and courtier to Alauddin Khalji and later Ghiyath al-Din Tughluq .
- Rai Bahadur Badri Das, the builder of the famous Calcutta Jain Temple dedicated to Lord Shitalnath in 1867.
- Sarabhai family of Ahmedabad

== See also ==
- Porwal
- Oswal
- Thakkar Pheru
