= Badridas Mukeem =

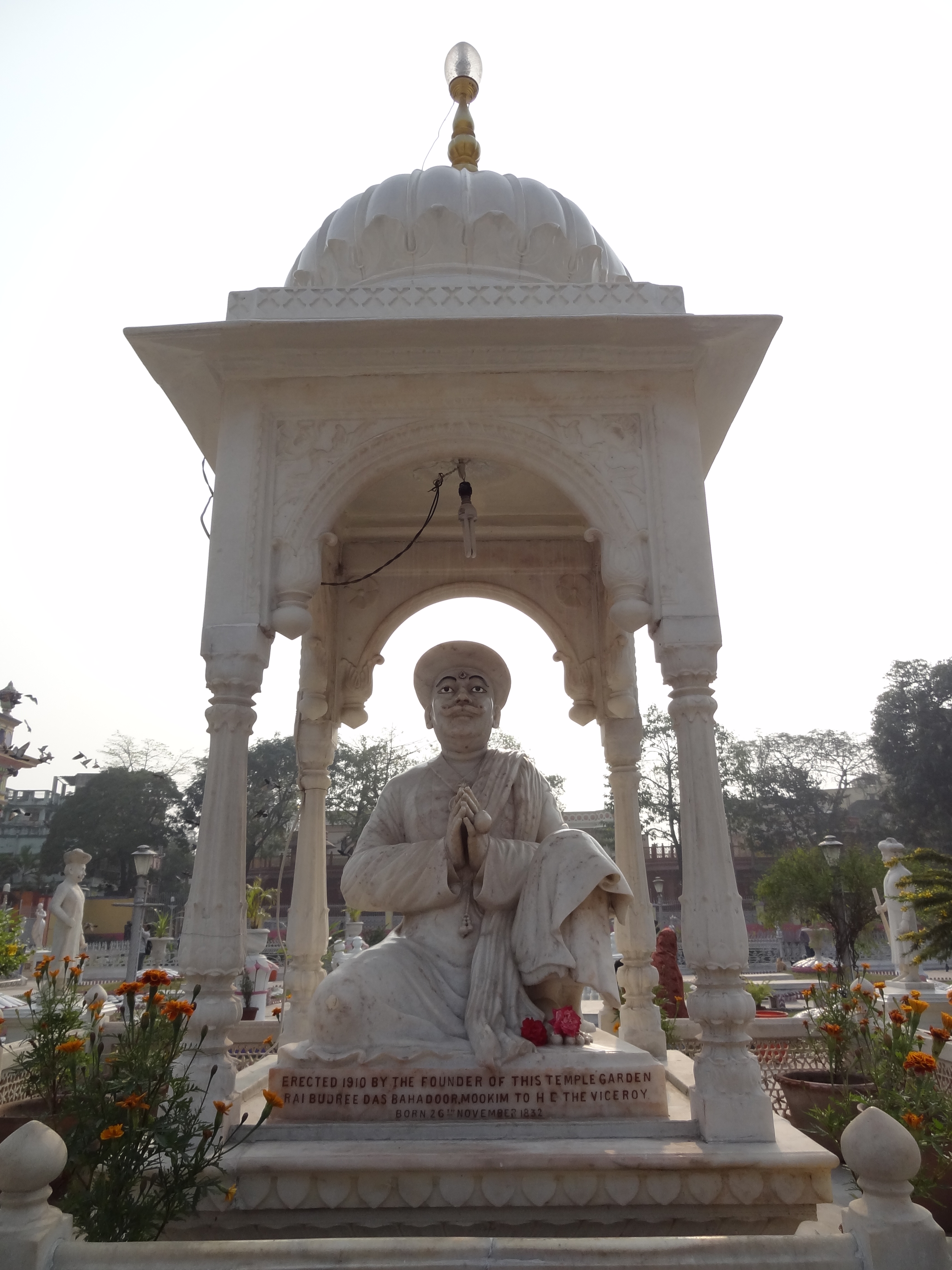
Statue of Rai Badridas Bahadur Mookim at the Calcutta Jain Temple

Rai Bahadur Badridas Mookim (also referred to as Rai Badridas Bahadur Mookim; 1833–1913) was a noted jeweler, philanthropist, Jain social leader and founder of the Calcutta Jain Temple.

== Biography ==
He belonged to Shrimal Jain community and was son of Kalkadas. He migrated to Calcutta in 1853 from Lucknow and soon established himself as a leading jeweler of the town with his honesty, integrity and enterprise. In 1871, Viceroy Lord Mayo appointed him the Mookim State Jeweller and honoured with the title of Rai Bahadur

He is noted for building the Calcutta Jain Temple located at Badridas Temple Street in north Kolkata. Inspired by his mother, he purchased the whole area including the big pond and got the pond filled up and constructed there the grand and artistic famous Garden Jain Temple which is now a center of attraction of a large number of foreign and Indian tourists of Kolkata. On completion of the temple in 1867, under the instructions of Jain saint, Kalyansuriji he decided to install there the image of Bhagwan Shitalnath. In search of a suitable Jain image he traveled extensively in the country. Under a miraculous intuition, an old image was dug out from a Jain temple, buried under ground near Agra. Greatly joyous, he brought the image to Calcutta with much respect and got it installed in the temple he had built at Calcutta.

Later, with the inspirations and cooperation of Seth Maneck Chand, J.P. of Bombay, he got closed a pig slaughter house which was opened at Shikharji. Apart from Calcutta Jain Temple, he also built Jain temples in Shikharji and Purimatal at Allahabad.

He was also the member of first delegation of 36 members, which met Harcourt Butler under leadership of Madan Mohan Malviya that proposed for foundation of a Hindu University in 1911.

Rai Badridas is the founder Chairman of Bengal National Chamber of Commerce and industry. He is also the founder of Panjrapole society and Dharamkanta of Johri Bazar.
