= Shikharji =

Jain pilgrimage centre and hill forest in Jharkhand, India

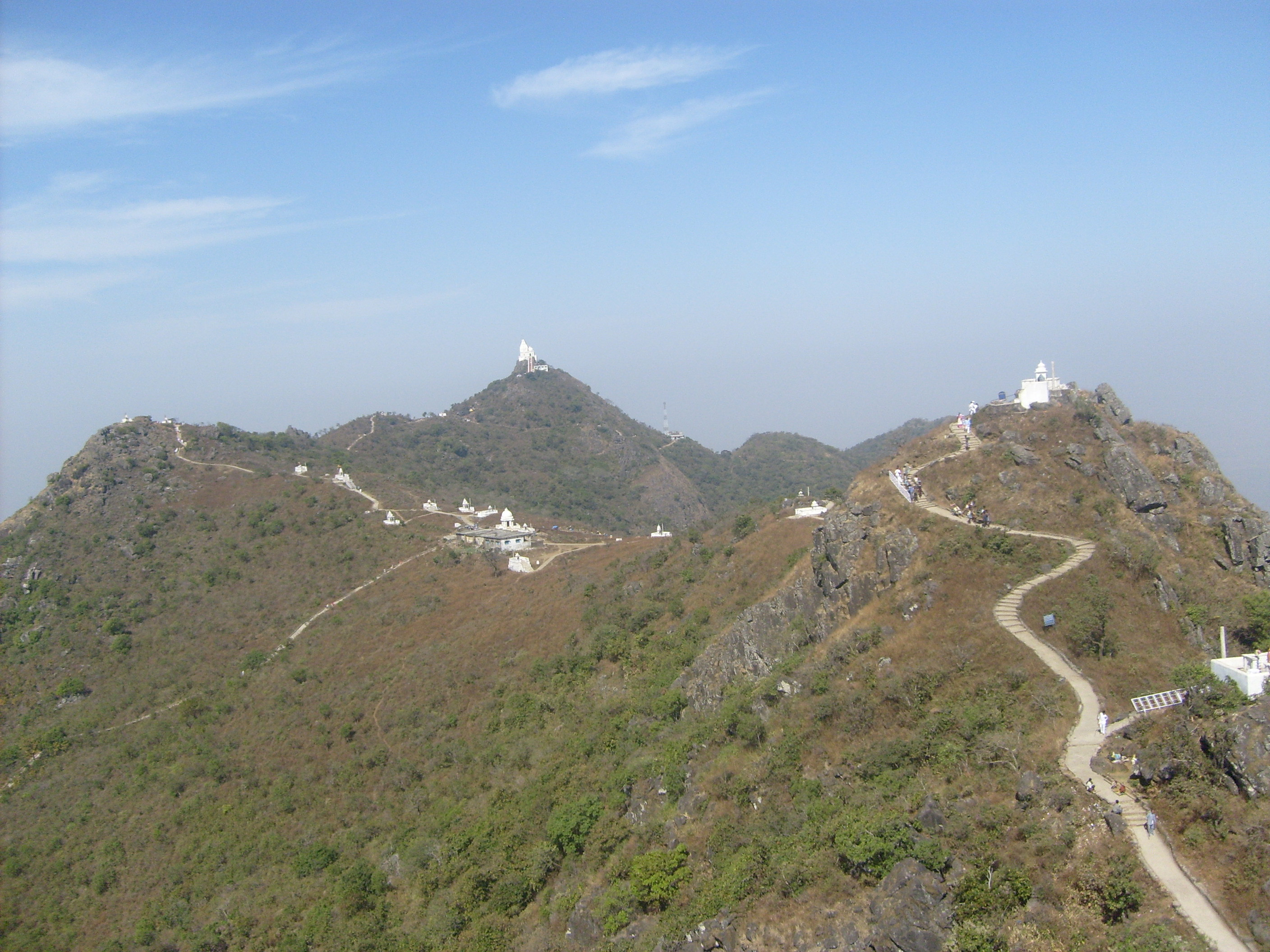
- Jain Temples at Shikarji

- Location within Jharkhand Shikharji (India)

Religion
- Affiliation: Jainism
- Deity: Tirthankaras
- Festival: Paryushana

Location
- Location: Giridih, Jharkhand, India
- Coordinates: 23°57′40″N 86°8′13.5″E

Architecture
- Elevation: 1,365 m (4,478 ft)

Shikharji (Śikharjī), also known as Sammet or Sammed Shikharji, is one of the holiest pilgrimage sites for Jains, in Giridih district, Jharkhand. It is located on Parasnath hill, the highest mountain in the state of Jharkhand. It is the most important Jain Tirtha (pilgrimage site), for it is believed to be the place where twenty of the twenty-four Jain tirthankaras (supreme preachers of dharma) along with many other monks attained moksha. It is one of the seven principal pilgrimage destinations along with Girnar, Pawapuri, Champapuri, Dilwara, Palitana, and Ashtapad Kailash.

== Etymology ==
Shikharji means the "venerable peak". The site is also called Sammed Śikhar "peak of concentration" because it is held to be the place where twenty of twenty-four tirthankaras attained moksha through meditation. The word "Parasnath" is derived from Parshvanatha, the twenty-third Jain tirthankara, who was one of those who attained moksha at the site in 772 BCE.

== Geography ==
Shikarji is located in an inland part of rural east India. It lies on NH-2, the Delhi-Kolkata highway in a section called the Grand Trunk road Shikharji rises to 4,480 feet (1,370 m) making it the highest mountain in Jharkhand state.

== Jain tradition ==
Shikharji is the place where twenty of the twenty-four Jain tirthankaras including Parshvanatha along with many other monks are believed to have attained moksha. This pilgrimage site is considered the most important Jain Tirtha by both the Digambara and Śvētāmbara sects. Shikharji along with Ashtapad, Girnar, Dilwara Temples of Mount Abu and Shatrunjaya are known as Śvētāmbara Pancha Tirth (five principal pilgrimage shrine).

== History ==
Archaeological evidences indicate the presence of Jains going back to at least 1500 BCE. The earliest literary reference to Shikharji as a tirth (place of pilgrimage) is found in the Jñātṛdhārmakātha, one of the twelve core texts of Jainism compiled in 6th century BCE by chief disciple of Mahavira. Shikharji is also mentioned in the Pārśvanāthacarita, a twelfth-century biography of Pārśva. A 13th century CE palm-leaf manuscript of Kalpa Sūtra and Kalakacaryakatha has an image of a scene of Parshavanatha's nirvana at Shikharji.

Modern history records show that Shikharji Hill is regarded as the place of worship of the Jain community. Vastupala, prime minister during the reign of king Vīradhavala and Vīsaladeva of Vaghela dynasty, constructed a Jain temple housing 20 idols of Tirthankaras. The temple also housed images of his ancestors and Samavasarana. During the regime of Mughal's rule in India, Emperor Akbar in the year 1583 had passed an firman (official order) granting the management of Shikharji Hill to the Jain community under the leadership of Harivijaya Suri to prevent the slaughter of animals in the vicinity. Seth Hiranand Mukim, personal jeweller of Mughal Emperor Jahangir, lead a party from Agra to Shikharji for Jain pilgrimage. In 1670, a Jain merchant from Agra named Kumarpal Lodha financed construction of temples at the site. In 1725, the area came under the control of the Jagat Seth family of Murshidabad. In 1825, Jagat Seth Kushalchand spent a substantial amount of money in consecrating the exact sites of liberation of all 20 tirthankaras, a Jal mandir, dharamsalas & shrines to subsidiary deities at the site, under the guidance of Tapa Gaccha monk Devijayji, with divine intervention from the Jain Śāsanadevī Padmāvatī. After the Jagat Seth family died out in 1912, the area came under the local zamindar based in Palganj of Giridih. In 1918, Seth Badridas Mukeem of the influential Johari Seth Jain community of Kolkata & Bahadur Singh Dugar of Murshidabad purchased the site from the zamindar on behalf of the Anandji Kalyanji trust & renovated the structures built by the Jagat Seths. The site went further renovations in the 1980s.

In 2019, the Government of Delhi included Sammed Shikharji under Mukhyamantri Tirth Yatra Yojana.

== Approach ==
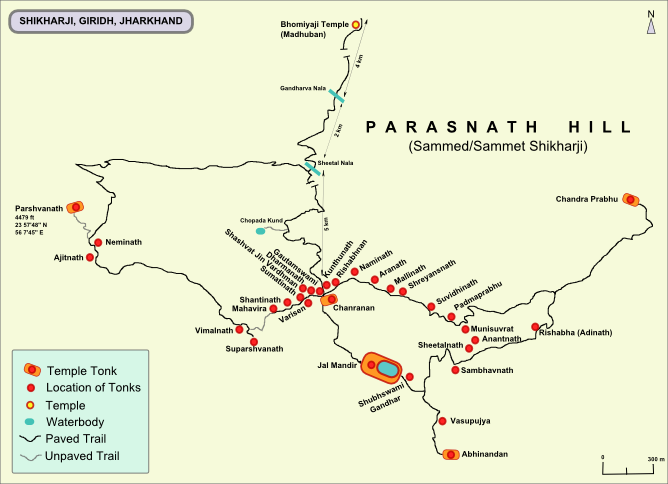
Trail map showing tonks on Parasnath Hill

The pilgrimage of Shikharji starts with a Palganj on Giridih road. Palganj has a small shrine dedicated to Parshvanatha. Then, offerings are made to temples at Madhuban on the base of Parasnath hill. Madhuban has many dharamshalas and bhojnalayas for pilgrims.

The section from Gandharva Nala stream to the summit is the most sacred to Jains. The pilgrimage is made on foot or by a litter or doli carried by a doliwallah along a concrete paved track. A trek of 16.777 miles (27.000 km) is covered while performing Parikrama of Shikharji. However, the complete parikrama of Madhuban to Shikharji and back is 57 kilometres (35 mi).

== Temples ==
Shikharji is considered as the most important pilgrimage centre by both the Digambara and Śvētāmbara sects of Jainism and the jurisdiction of the main temples is shared by both sects.

The current structure of temples at Shikharji was re-built by Jagat Seth Mahtabchand (father of the Kushalchand mentioned before) in 1768 CE. However, the idol itself is very old. The Sanskrit inscription at the foot of the image is dated 1678 CE. One of the shrines dates back to the 14th century. Several Śvētāmbara temples were constructed in 20th century. Pilgrims offer rice, sandal, dhupa, flower, fruits and diya.

At the base of Shikharji is a temple to Bhomiyaji (Taleti). On the walls of the Jain temple at the village of Madhuban, there is a mural painting depicting all the temples on Parasnath Hill. Śvētāmbara Bhaktamara temple, established by Acharya Ramchandrasuri, is the first temple to house a Bhaktamara Stotra yantra.

A large Digambara Jain temple depicting Nandishwar Dweep is at the base of the hill. The Nichli temple, built by a Calcutta merchant in 18th century, is noteworthy for its architecture. The temple features arched gateways and carvings of Tirthankaras on the temple wall.

=== Tonks ===
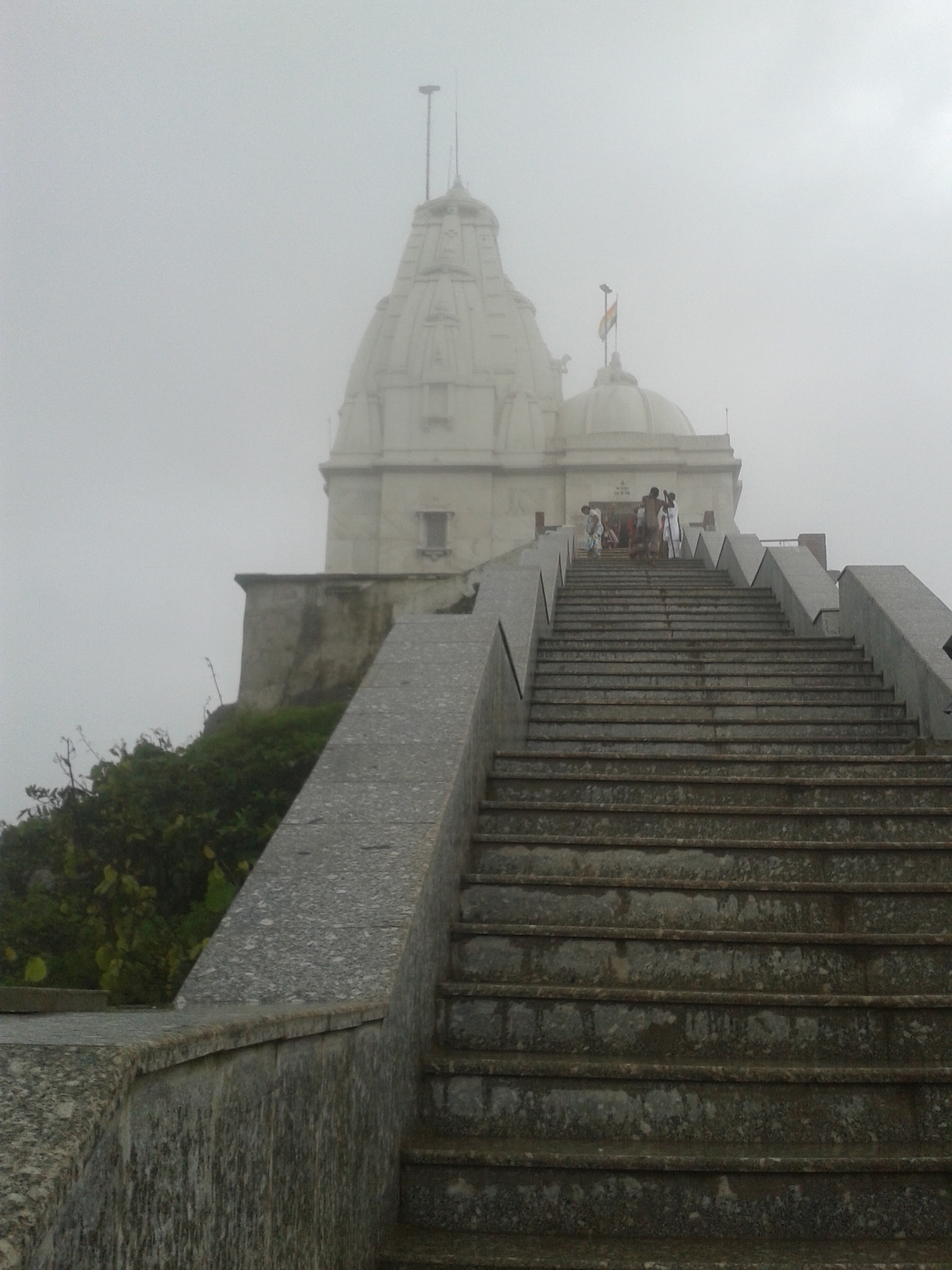
Parshvanatha Tonk

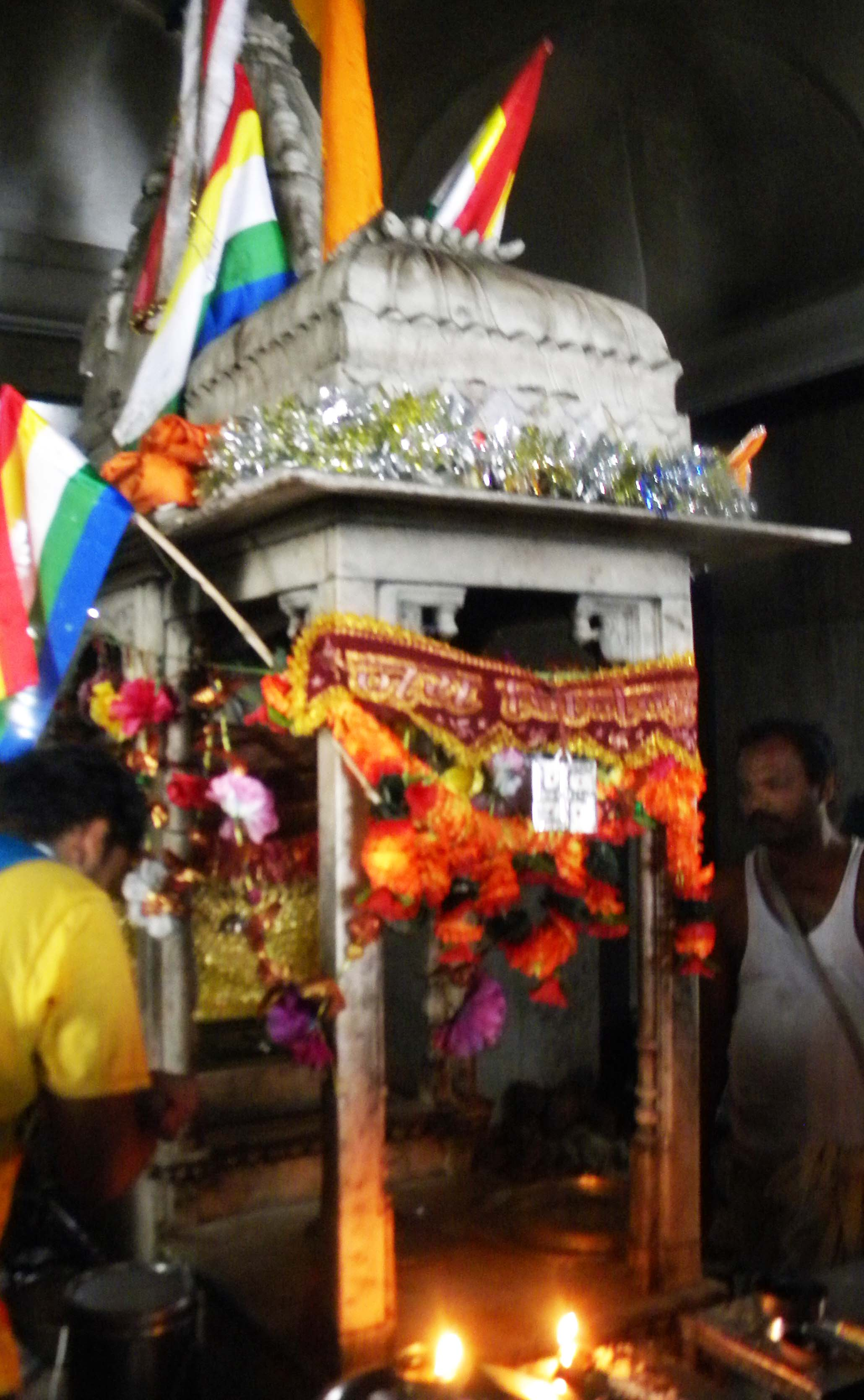
Parshvanatha footprint

There are 31 tonks (hill-top temple shrines) each enshrines footprints, in black or white marble, of each Tirthankara. Since, these temple does not have images these tonks are worshipped by both Digambara and Śvētāmbara.

Parshvanatha tonk

The hilltop where Parshvanatha attained moksha is called 'suvarṇabhadra kūța' and is considered the most sacred hilltop on Shikharji. The Parshvanatha tonk is constructed at this summit. The chatra distinguishes Parshvanatha footprint from footprints of other 23 Tirthankaras which does not have chatra and are indistinguishable. The temple consists of two floors. The top floor has a tonk with no footprints of Parshvanatha, and lower floor enshrines a saffron coloured replica of the face of Parasnath built into a wall. Devotees make offerings of uncooked rice and sweets here.

The tonks along the track are as follows:

1. Gautam Ganadhara Swami
2. Kunthunatha
3. Rishabhanatha
4. Chandraprabha
5. Naminatha
6. Aranatha
7. Māllīnātha
8. Shreyanasanatha
9. Pushpadanta
10. Padmaprabha
11. Munisuvrata
12. Chandraprabha
13. Rishabha
14. Anantanatha
15. Shitalanatha
16. Sambhavanatha
17. Vasupujya
18. Abhinandananatha
19. Ganadhara
20. Jal Mandir
21. Dharmanatha
22. Mahavira
23. Varishen
24. Sumatinatha
25. Shantinatha
26. Mahavira
27. Suparshvanatha
28. Vimalanatha
29. Ajitanatha
30. Neminatha
31. Parshvanatha

=== Fair ===
Sammed Shikhar festival is annual fair organised here that draws a huge number of devotees.

== Replicas ==
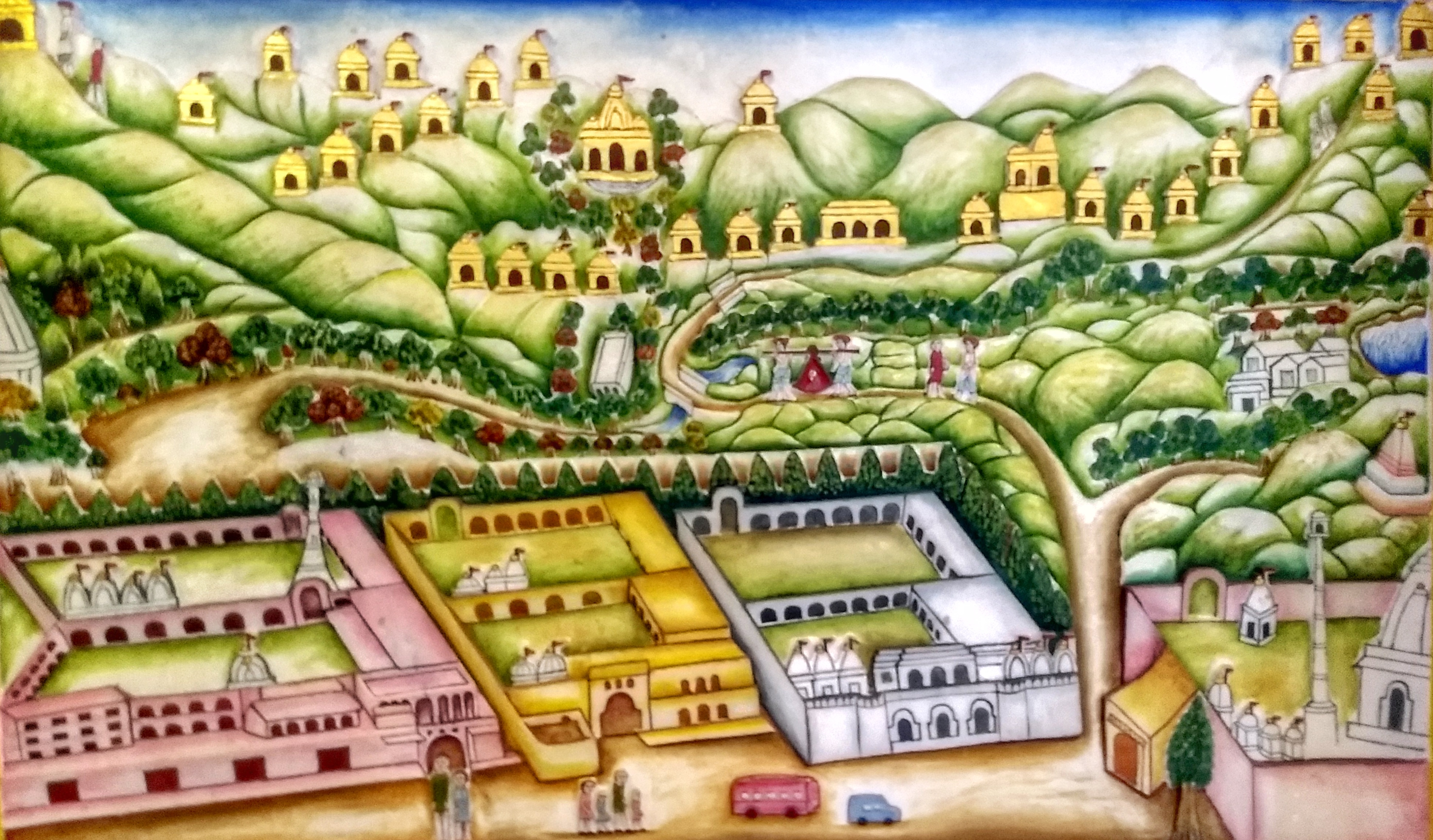
Shikharji mural, Gaj Mandir in Rohtak

The representation of Sammeta-Shikharji is a popular theme in Jain shrines.

On 13 August 2012, the world's first to-scale complete replication of Shikharji was opened in Siddhachalam in New Jersey over 120 acres of hilly terrain called Shikharji at Siddhachalam, it has become an important place of pilgrimage for the Jain diaspora. There is a small scale replica of Shikharji at Dādābadī, Mehrauli. Ranakpur Jain temple has a depiction of Shikharji. Shitalnath temple in Patan, Gujarat has a wooden plaque with carving of Shikharji.

== Transport ==
The nearest railway station is Parasnath Station which is situated in Isri Bazar, Dumri, Jharkhand. It is around 25 km from Madhuban, at the base of Shikharji. Parasnath station is situated on Grand Chord, which is part of Howrah-Gaya-Delhi line and Howrah-Allahabad-Mumbai line. Many long-distance trains halt at Parasnath Station. Daily connectivities to Mumbai, Delhi, Jaipur, Ajmer, Kolkata, Patna, Allahabad, Kanpur, Jammutawi, Amritsar, Kalka etc. are available. Even 12301-12302 Howrah Rajdhani Express via Gaya Junction has a halt on Parasnath station which run 6 days a week.

By Airway;

The Nearest airport is Deoghar Airport in Deoghar Dist, known as Baidyanath dham which is famous for Hindu pilgrimage sites, part of 12 jyotirling for Lord Shiva. The airport is 107 km away from Shikharji and a 3-hour drive.

Another airport is Kazi Nazrul Islam Airport, Durgapur (RDP) West Bengal and a 4-hour drive from the airport. Durgapur has direct flights from Kolkata and Delhi.

Birsa Munda Airport, Ranchi (IXR), Jharkhand is also around 180 km (Approximately 4.5 hours), and the drive to Shikhar Ji is quite smooth. Direct flights are available from Ahmedabad, Bangalore, Bhubaneswar, Chennai, Delhi, Deoghar, Goa–Mopa, Hyderabad, Kolkata, Lucknow, Mangalore, Mumbai, Patna and Pune.

== Shikharji movement ==
Save Shikharji was a protest movement by Jain sects against the state's alleged development plans for Shikharji. Jains opposed the plans of the state government to improve the infrastructure on the site of the hill in order to boost tourism as alleged attempts to commercialize the Shikharji hill. The movement demanded that Shikharji Hill be declared officially a place of worship by the Government of Jharkhand. On 26 October 2018, the Government of Jharkhand issued an official memorandum declaring the Shikharji hill as a 'place of worship'.

In December 2022, Jains carried out massive protests and a one-day nationwide strike against the rule by the Government of Jharkhand to tag Shikharji as a place of tourism. Jharkhand government's decision to declare 'sacred' Shri Sammed Shikharji a tourist place and incidents of allegedly desecrating the sacred Shetrunjaya Hills in Gujarat's Bhavnagar district have triggered anger among lakhs of people belonging to the Jain community. A 72-year-old Jain monk who was on a fast against the Jharkhand government's decision died Tuesday in Jaipur, according to a community leader. Police said after participating in a peace march in Jaipur against the decision, Sugyeysagar Maharaj sat on the fast at Sanghiji temple in Sanganer area of the city.

In January 2023, the Central government halted all tourism development activities on Parasnath Hills.

== Gallery ==
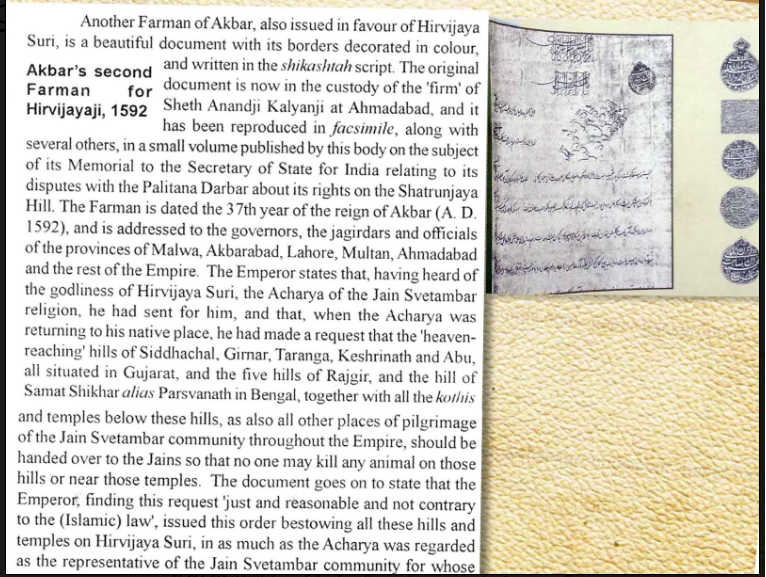
Firman issued by Akbar which considered Shikharji as pilgrimage

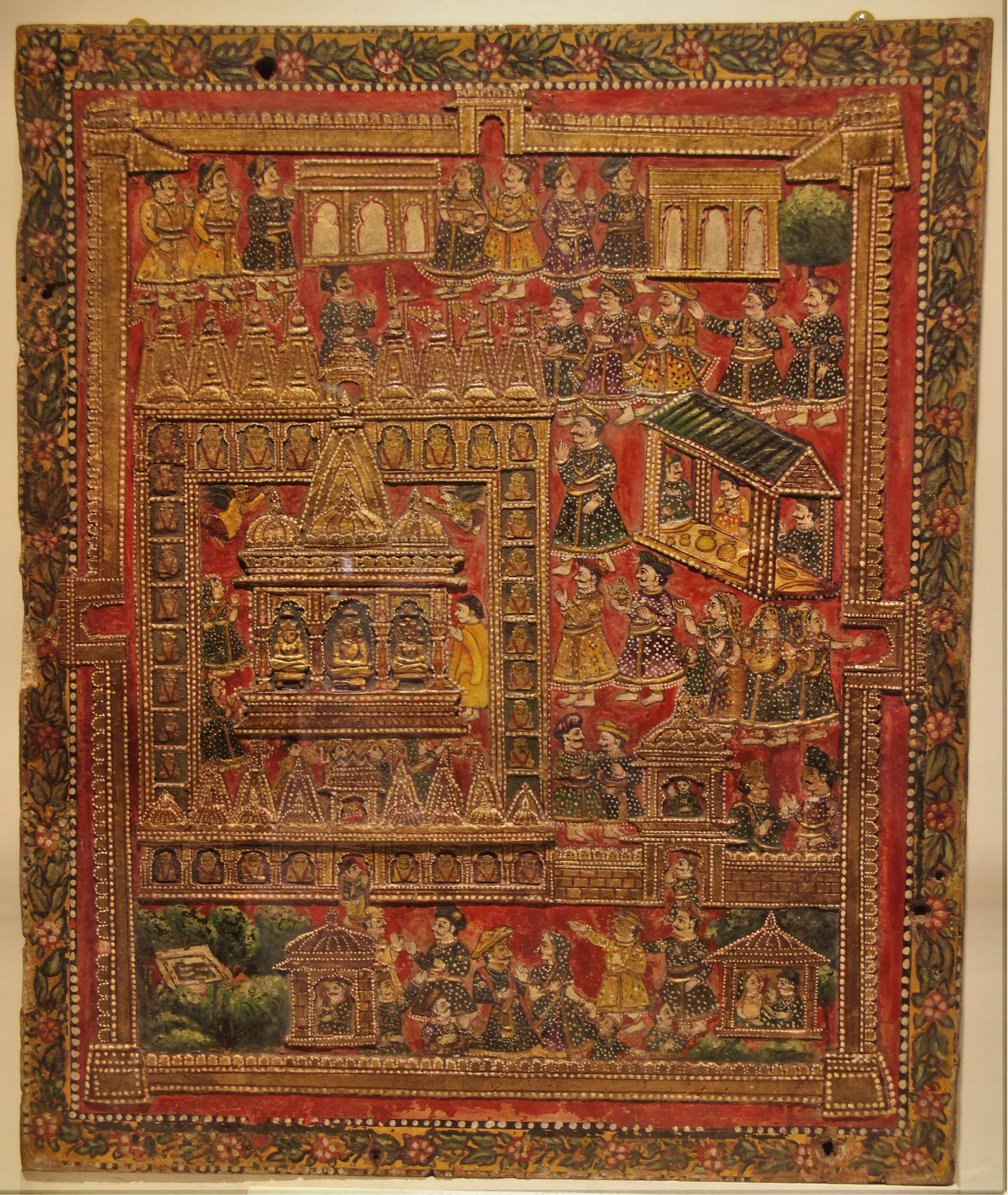
Pancha Tirth including Shikharji, Chhatrapati Shivaji Maharaj Vastu Sangrahalaya, 20th century

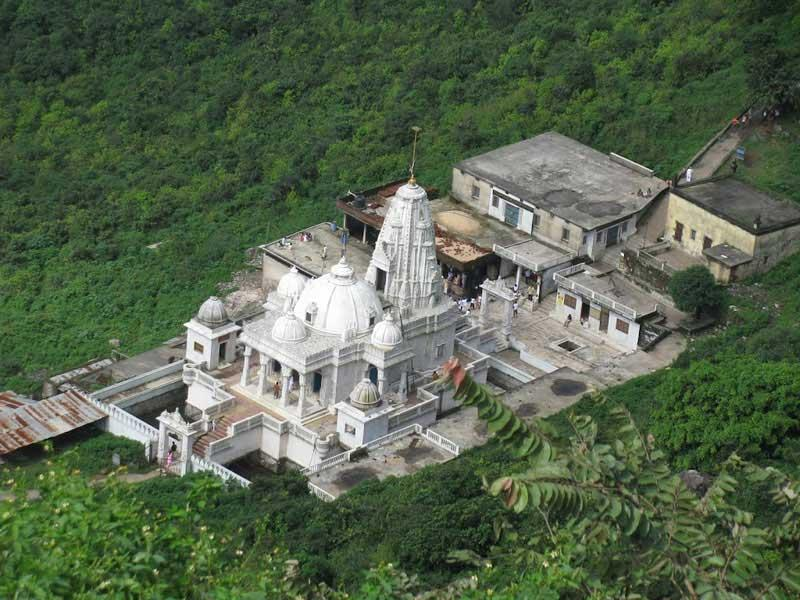
Aerial view of Jal Mandir

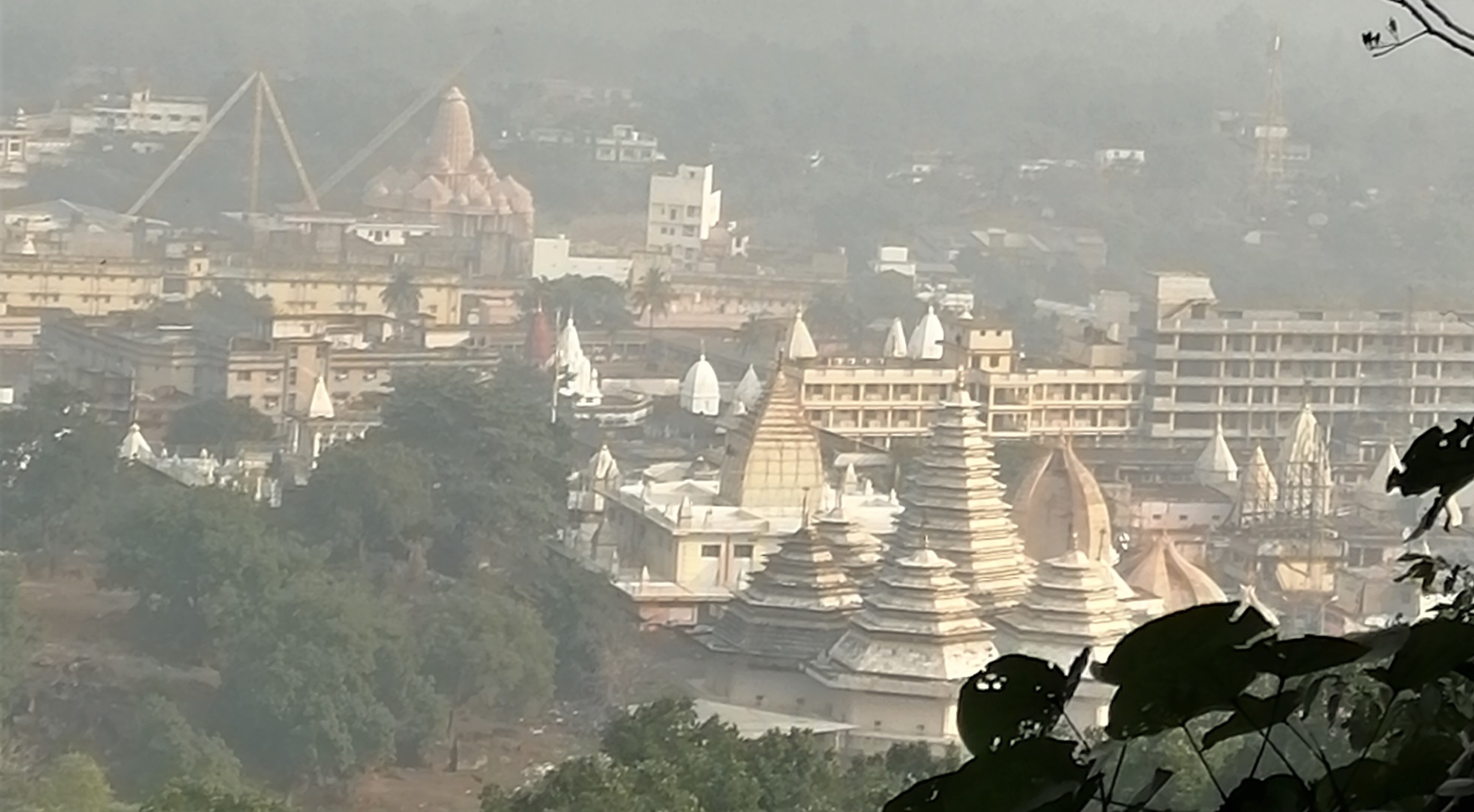
Temples at base of the hill

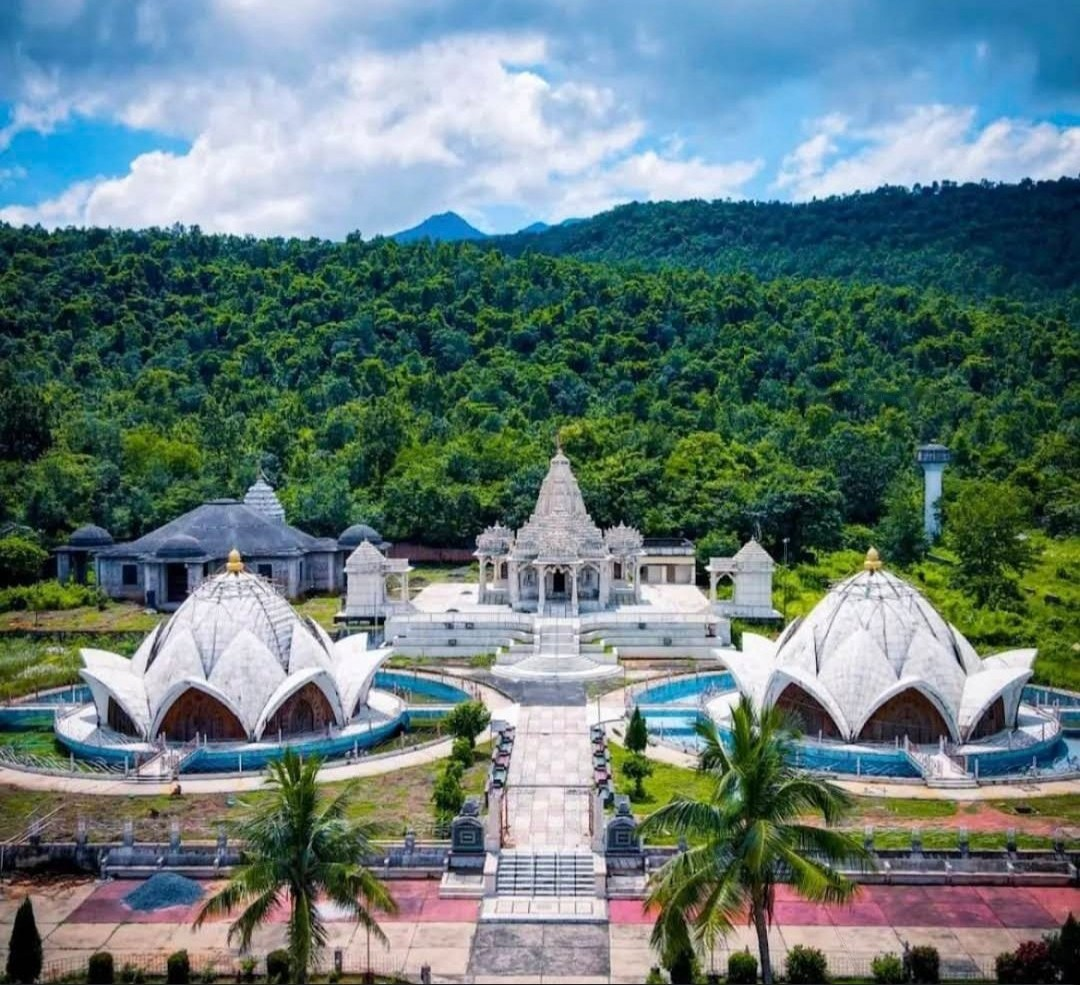
Shwetambar Lotus temple of Lord Parshwanath at foothills of Parasnath hill

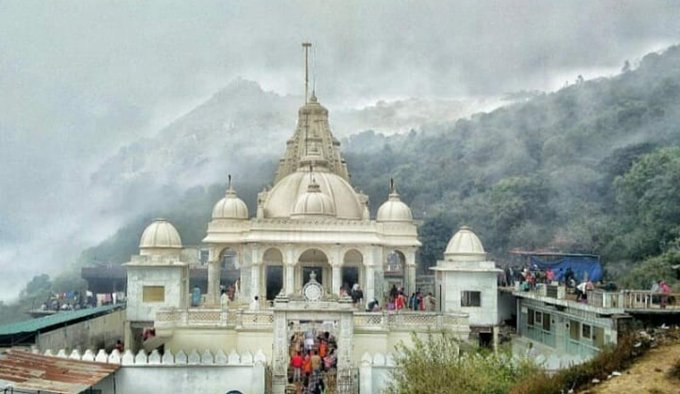
Jal Mandir

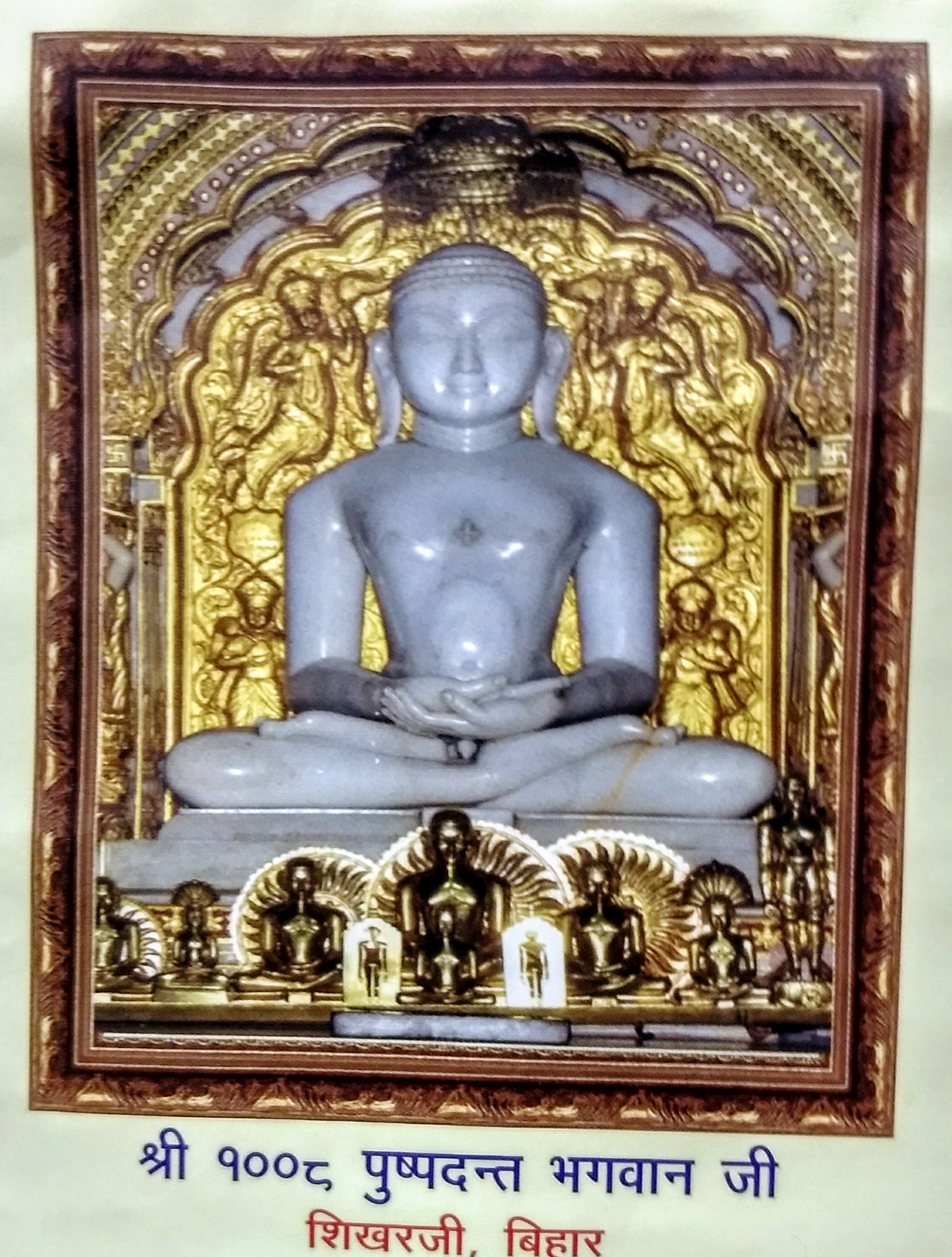
Pushpadanta idol inside Pushpadanta Jinalaya

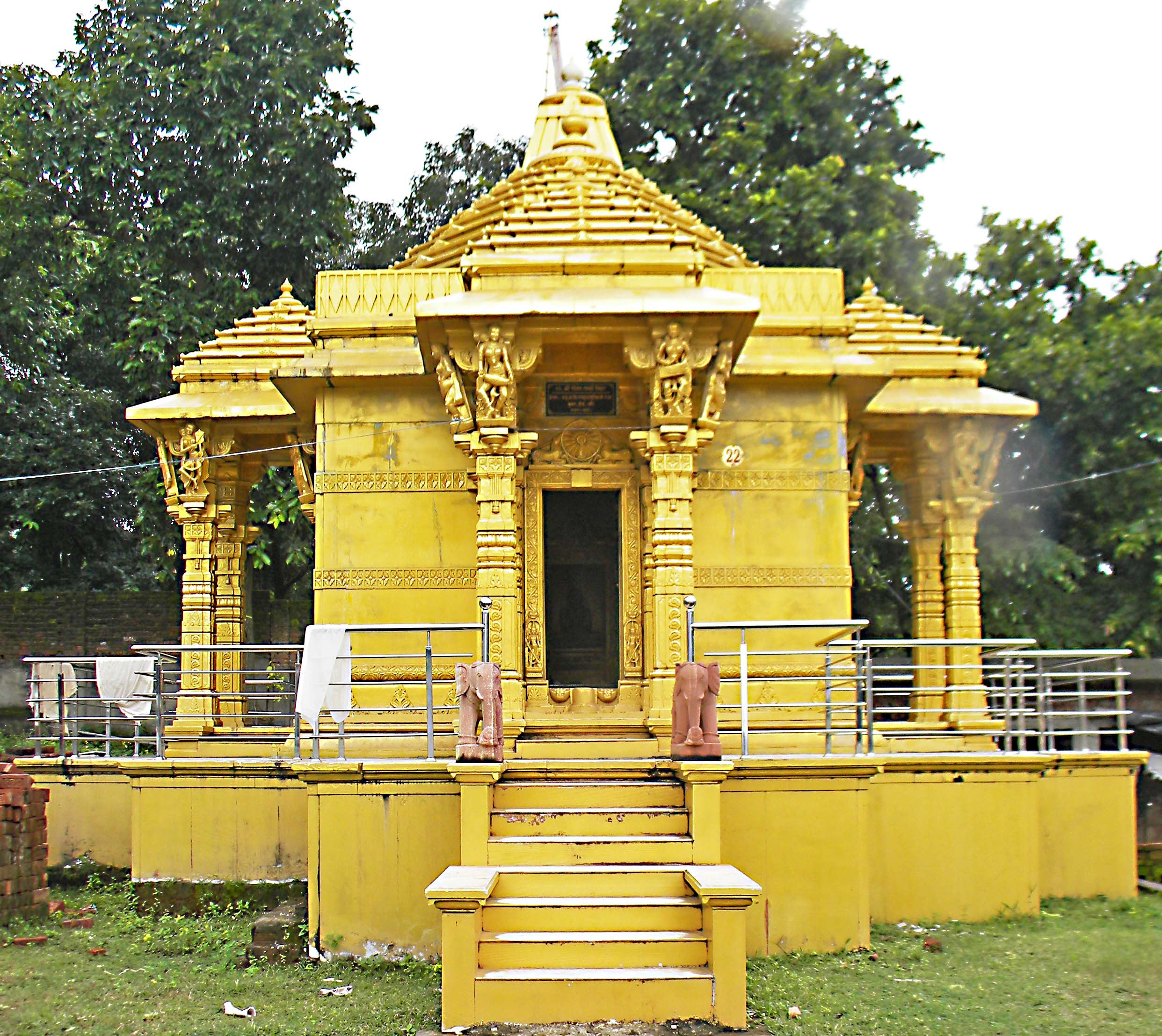
Gautam Swami Temple at Madhuban

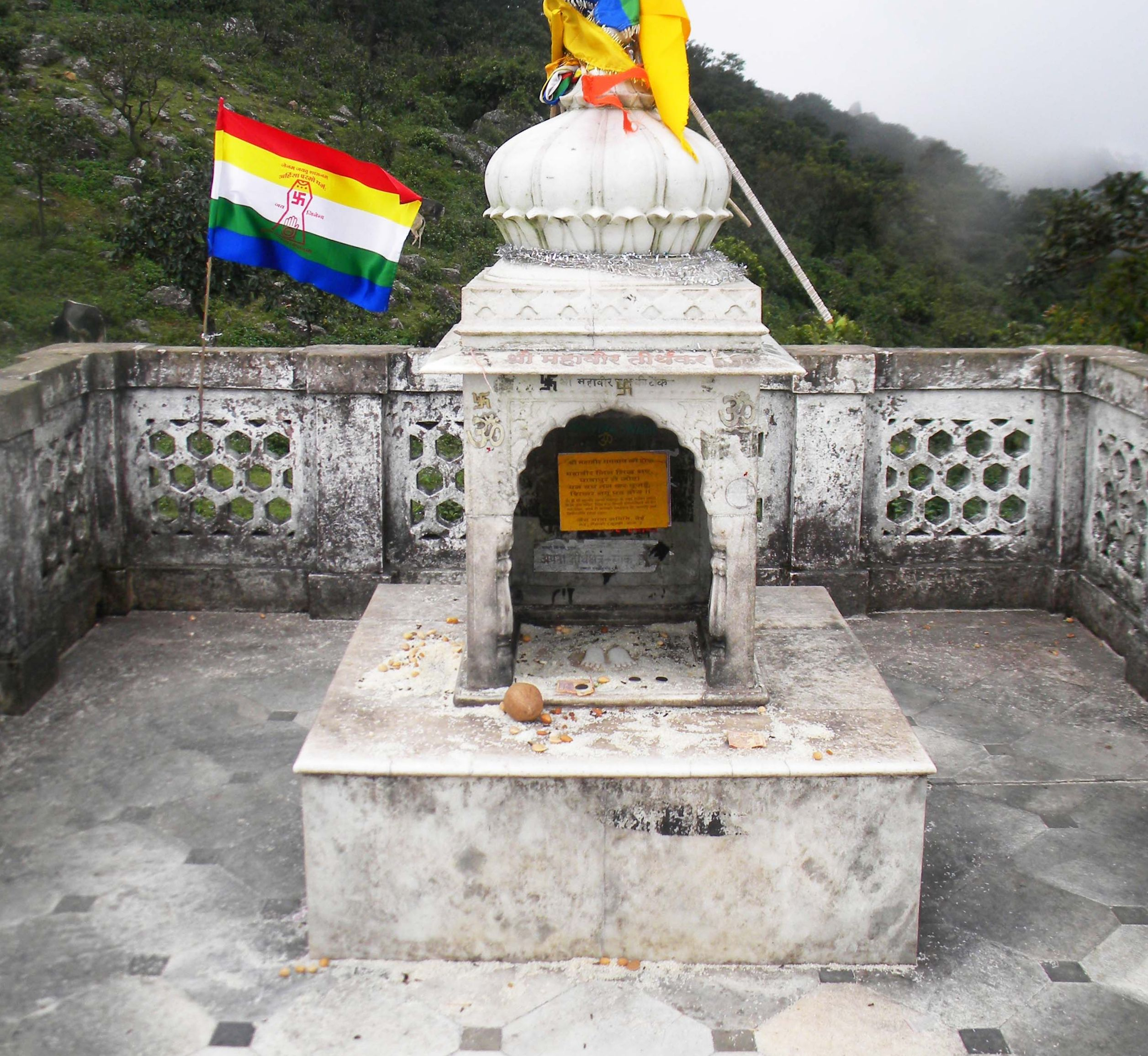
Mahavir Tonk

== See also ==
- List of Jain temples
- Tirth Pat
- Nirvana Kanda
