= Nirvana Kanda =

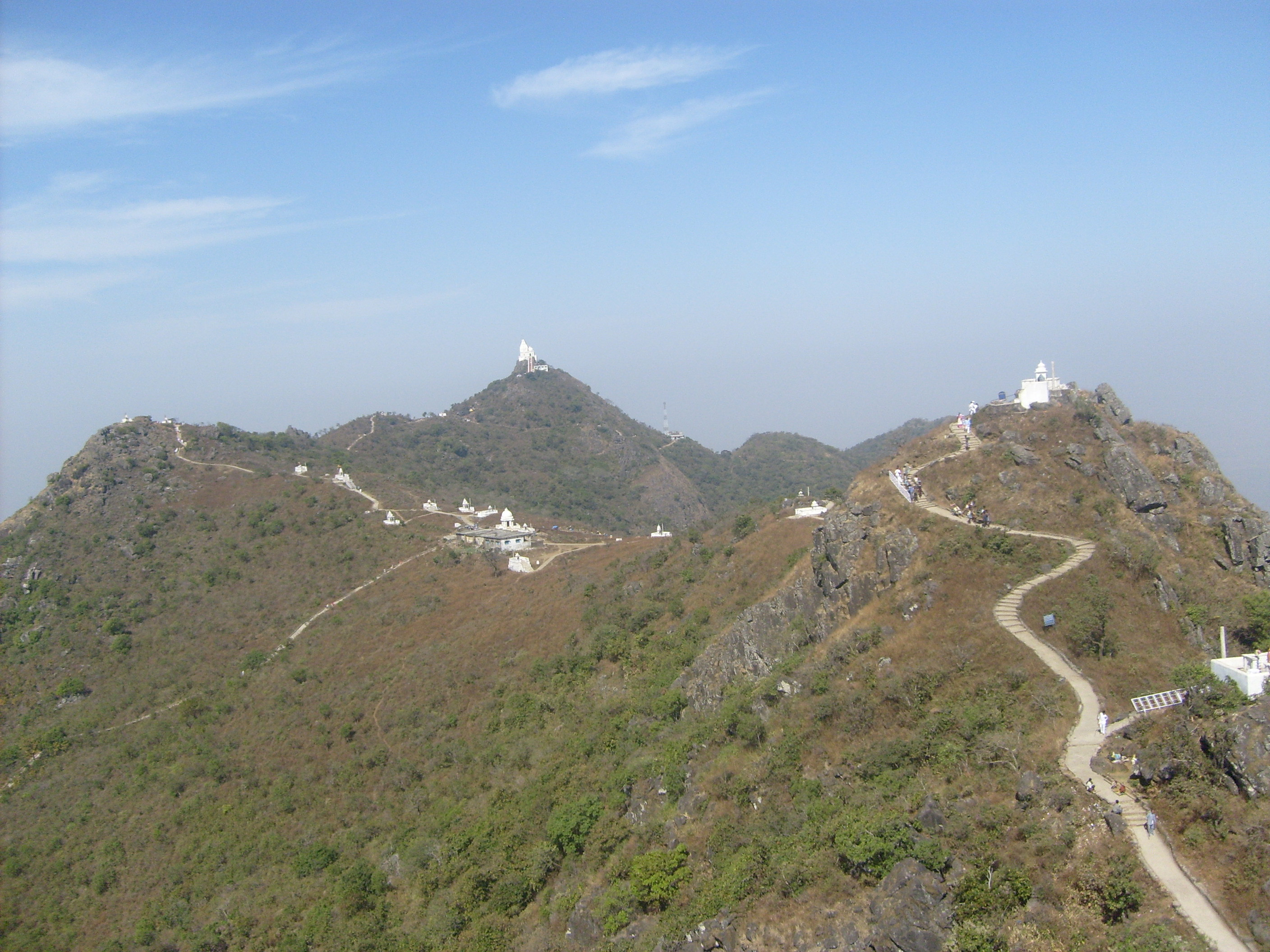
- Tonks of 20 Tirthankaras at Samet Shikhar

Information
- Author: Acharya Kundakunda

Nirvana Kanda is an ancient Prakrit Jain composition that describes the sacred sites where Jain sages have attained Nirvana. It is also termed Nirvana Bhakti.

In inscription of 13th century that describes the construction of the Kirti Stambha at Chittor gives 10 shlokas that give a rendering in Sanskrit. A Hindi rendering Nirvana Kanda Bhasha was composed by Bhaiya Bhagvatidaas in Samvat 1741.

It is popularly recited on many occasions.

== Author ==
It is traditionally attributed to Acharya Kundakunda who is regarded to be the author of several Prakrit texts like Samayasar.

== Contents ==
The text include:

- Nirvana sites of 24 tirthankaras (Ashtapad Mount, Champapuri, Girnar, Pawapuri and Samet Shikhar)

अट्ठावयम्मि उसहो, चम्पाए वासुपुज्ज जिणणाहो,

उज्जन्ते णेमिजिणो, पावाए णिब्बुदो महावीरो ||१||
वीसम तु जिणवरिंदा, अमरासुर वन्दिंदा धुदकिलेसा,
सम्मेदे गिरि सिहरे णिव्वाण गया, णमो तेसिं ||२||

"On Ashtapad Lord Rishabha, at Champa Lord Vasupujya, On Urjayant (Girnar) Lord Nemi, and at Pava Lord Mahavir attained nirvana.

And the rest 20 Lord Jinas, worshipped by the gods, entered Nirvana at the top of mount Sammed, respect to them."

The words "अट्ठावयम्मि उसहो" also occur in Tiloyapannatti.

- Nirvana sites of other Kevalias including Shatrunjaya

== See also ==
- Tirth Pat
- Vividha Tirtha Kalpa
- Jainism in Delhi
- Shatrunjaya
