= Thakkar Pheru =

Indian treasurer under Khalji dynasty

Thakkar Pheru (IAST: Ṭhakkura Pherū) was the treasurer of Khalji. He was active between 1291 and 1347.

Alauddin Khalji recruited Ṭhakkura Pherū, a Shrimal Jain as an expert on coins, metals and gems. For the benefit of his son Hemapal, Pheru wrote several books on related subjects including Dravyaparīkṣa in 1318 based on his experience at the master mint, and the Ratnaparikṣa (Pkt. Rayaṇaparikkhā) in 1315 "having seen with my own eyes the vast collection of gems … in the treasury of Alāʾ al-Dīn Khaljī." He was continuously employed until the rule of Ghiasuddin Tughluq.

He is also known for his work on mathematics Ganitasārakaumudi.
