= Madhuban, Giridih =

Madhuban
- Village
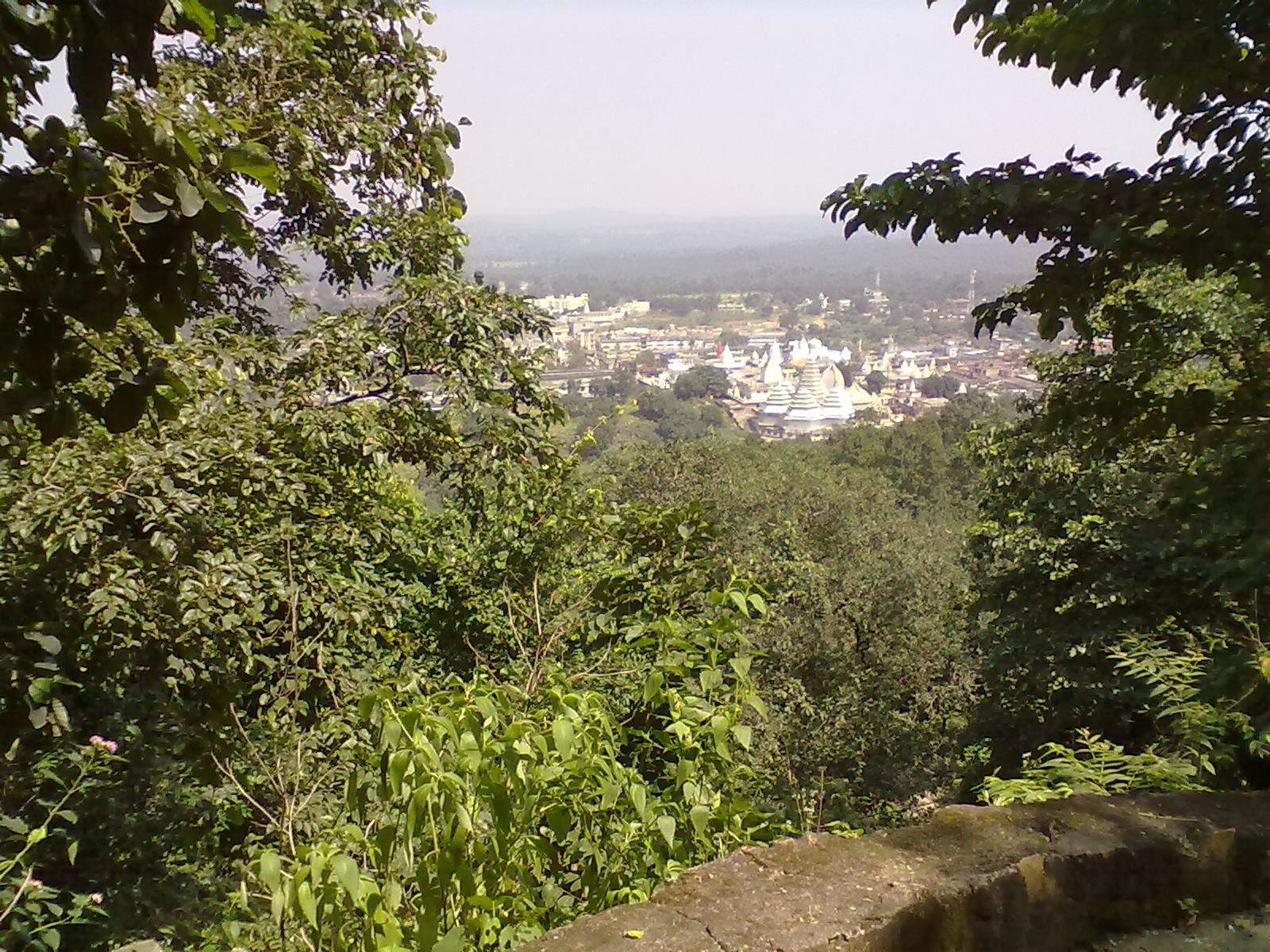
- Madhuban from Parasnath Hill

- Location in Jharkhand, India Madhuban (India)
- Coordinates: 24.013843°N 86.146278°E
- Country: India
- State: Jharkhand
- District: Giridih

Population (2011)
  - Total: 3,059

Languages (*For language details see Pirtand block#Language and religion)
  - Official: Hindi, Urdu
- Time zone: UTC+5:30 (IST)
- PIN: 825108 (Pirtand)
- Telephone/ STD code: 06532
- Vehicle registration: JH 11
- Lok Sabha constituency: Giridih
- Vidhan Sabha constituency: Giridih
- Website: giridih.nic.in

Madhuban is a village in the Pirtand CD block in the Dumri subdivision of the Giridih district in the Indian state of Jharkhand.

== Madhuban museum ==
In madhuban a jain museum features the history of Jainism.

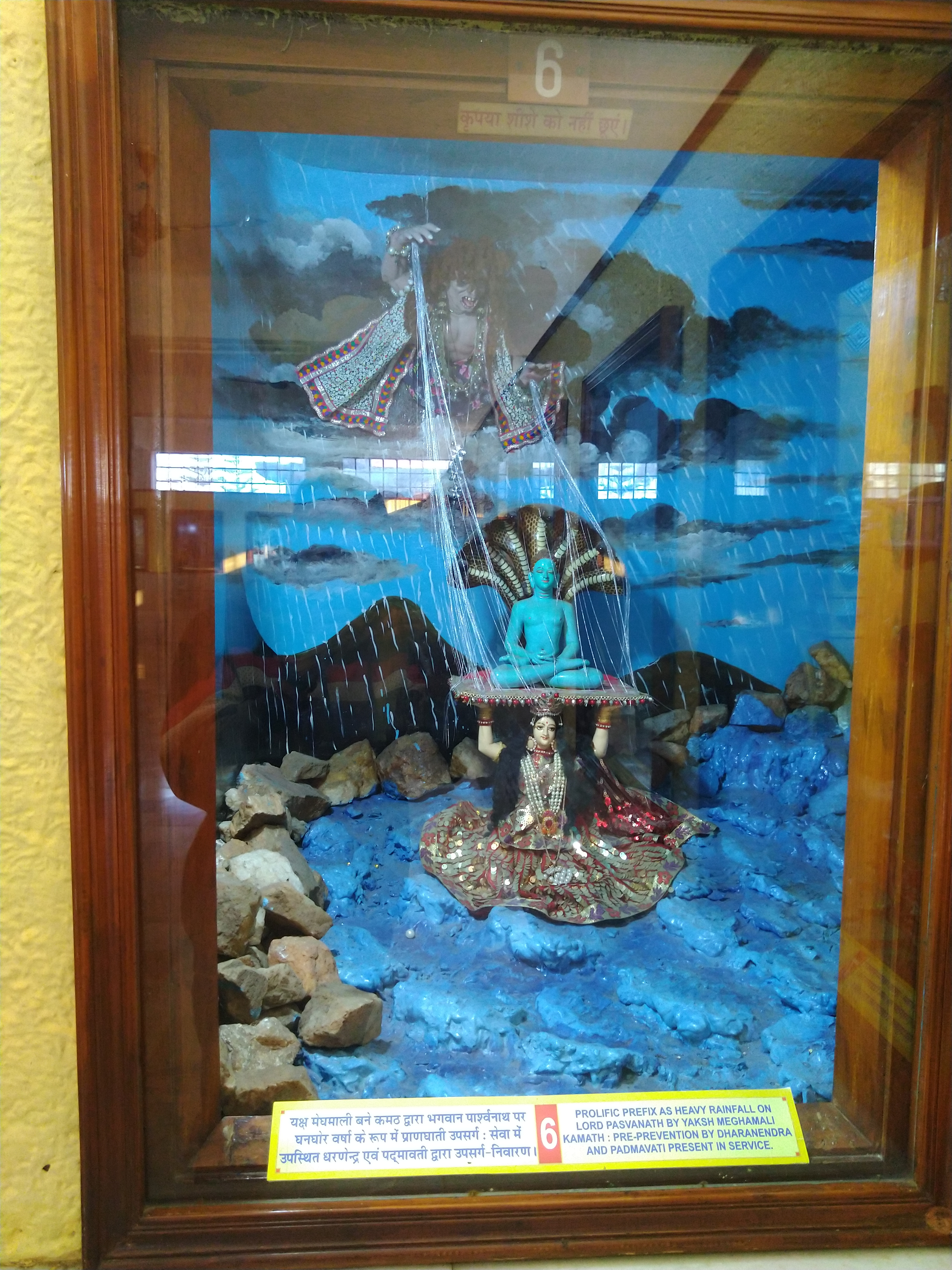
A diorama in Jain Museum of Madhuban, Giridih depicting the event at Ahichchhatra

== Geography ==
Cities, towns and locations in the Giridih district in North Chotanagpur Division
M: municipality, CT: census town, R: rural/ urban centre, H: historical/ religious/ tourist centre
Owing to space constraints in the small map, the actual locations in a larger map may vary slightly

=== Location ===
Madhuban is located at 24.013843°N 86.146278°E.

=== Area overview ===
Giridih district is a part of the Chota Nagpur Plateau, with rocky soil and extensive forests. Most of the rivers in the district flow from the west to east, except in the northern portion where the rivers flow north and north west. The district has coal and mica mines. It is an overwhelmingly rural district with small pockets of urbanisation.

Note: The map alongside presents some of the notable locations in the district. All places marked in the map are linked in the larger full screen map.

== Demographics ==
According to the 2011 Census of India, Madhuban had a total population of 3,059, of which 1,646 (54%) were males and 1,413 (46%) were females. Population in the age range 0-6 years was 488. The total number of literate persons in Madhuban was 1,768 (68.77% of the population over 6 years).

== Transport ==
National Highway 14A, locally popular as Isri-Giridih Road, passes near Madhuban.

Indian Railways have signed a joint venture agreement, in January 2017, with Jharkhand for railway development in the state. This agreement includes the Giridih-Parashnath-Madhuban line.

== Culture ==
Madhuban, located at the base of 4,479 feet (1,365 m) high Parasnath Hill / Shikharji is a place of considerable religious importance for the Jains, with a temple believed to be more than 2,000 years old. The Shamosharan Temple and Bhomiyajee Asthan are well known. The Daharam Mangal Vidapith temple is more recently constructed.
