= Calcutta Jain Temple =

Śvetāmbara Jain temple in Kolkata, India

Kolkata Jain Temple
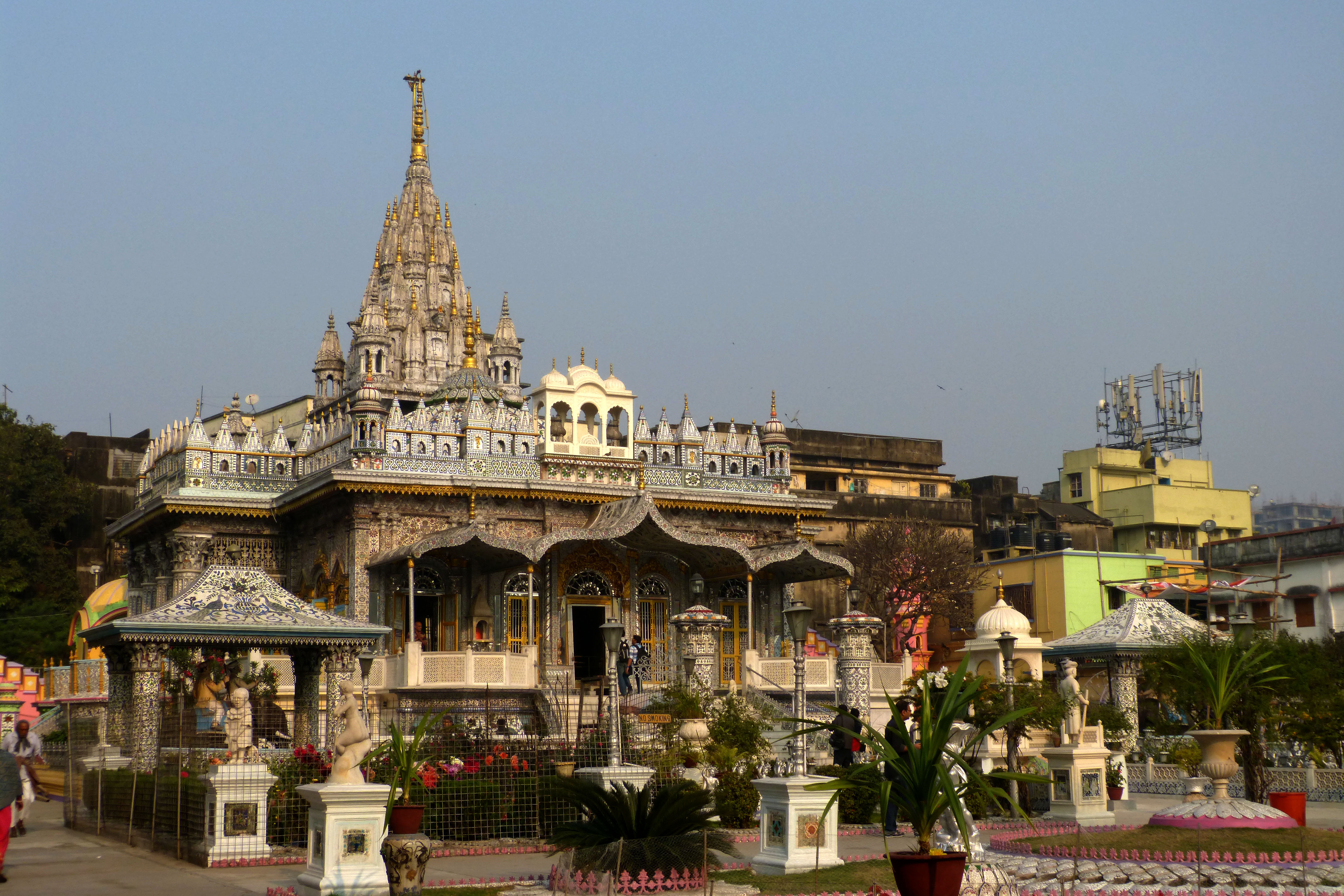
- Parshwanath temple

- Location within Kolkata Location within West Bengal Location within India

Religion
- Affiliation: Jainism
- Sect: Śvetāmbara
- Deity: Parshvanatha, and Shitalanatha
- Festivals: Mahavir Janma Kalyanak, Paryushan

Location
- Location: Gouribari, Maniktala, Kolkata, West Bengal
- Interactive map of Kolkata Jain Temple
- Coordinates: 22.591621°N 88.377842°E

Architecture
- Creator: Rai Badridas Bahadoor Mookim
- Established: 1867
- Temple: 5

Kolkata Jain Temple (also known as Parshwanath Temple) is a Śvetāmbara Jain temple at Badridas Temple Street, Gouribari in Maniktala and a major tourist attraction of Kolkata, India. The temple construction in 1867 was paid for by philanthropist Rai Badridas Bahadoor Mookim. The consecration was performed by a Jain acharya named Kalyansuri Maharaja.

== History ==
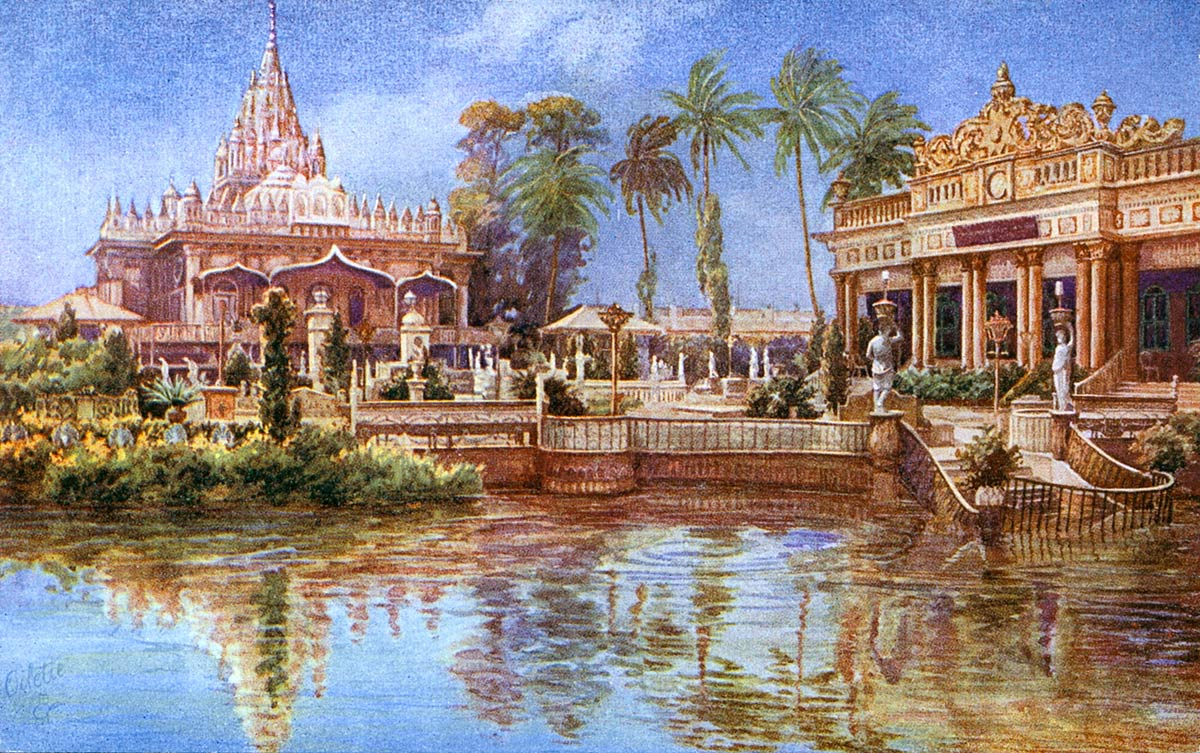
Pareshnath Jain Temple, c. 1907

The Parshwanath Jain Temple of Kolkata was built by Ray Badridas Bahadur in 1867. Thousands of people visit this temple annually. Parshwanath is actually a complex of 4 temples. The main shrine is dedicated to Shitalanatha, the tenth tirthankara. The pratishtha, or consecration ceremony, was performed by Sri Kalyansurishwarji Maharaj. Three of the temples are dedicated to tirthankars Shitalanatha, Chandraprabha, and Mahavira. The fourth temple is called the Dadawadi and Kushalji Maharaja temple. Footprints of famous Jain monks Acharya Jinadattasuri (1075-1154 CE) and Acharya Jinkushalsuri (born ca. 1280 CE) are installed here. South of the Shitalanatha temple lies the shrine of Chandraprabha, built by Ganeshlal Kapoorchand Jahar in the year 1895.

The Parshwanath temple is one of the most important Jain temples in Kolkata. The deities are often decorated with semi-precious stones and precious metals as per devotional rituals of the Śvetāmbaras. The Paryushana, an 8-day festival, is celebrated at Parshwanath in the Bhadrav month (August–September). During this period, Jains recommit themselves to the practice of ahimsa, listen to recitations of scriptures of worship and perform charitable deeds. The last day of festival is called Samvatsari. On this day, Jains forgive and seek forgiveness for their mistakes committed, knowingly or unknowingly, on all living beings. An elaborate, penitential retreat called "samvatsari pratikramana" is performed on this day. After the pratikramana, Jains seek forgiveness from all the creatures of the world, including friends and relatives, by uttering the phrase — Micchami Dukkadam or its variants like "Khamau Sa", "Uttam Kshama" or "Khamat Khamna".

== About the Temple ==
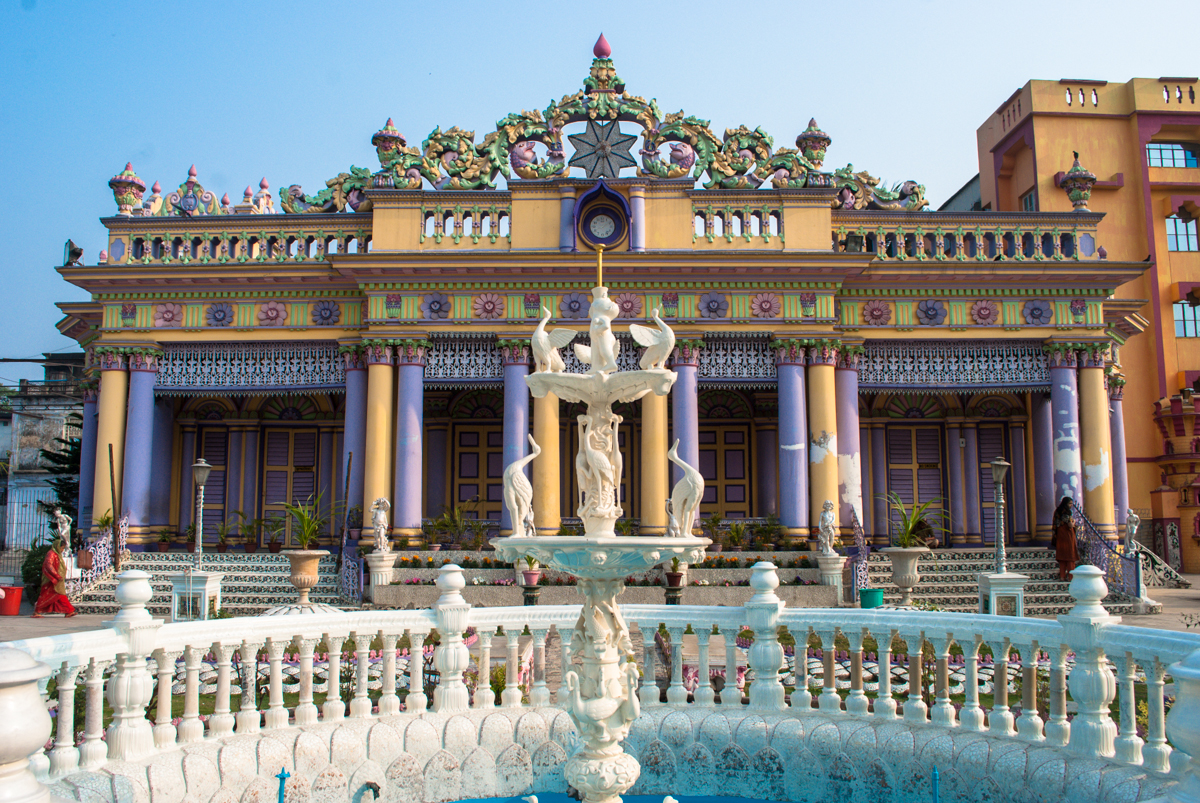
Shitalnath Bhagwan Temple

The complex is subdivided into 4 temples:

- Shitalanatha temple
- Chandraprabha temple
- Mahavira temple
- Dādābadī temple

The entire temple complex is dedicated to Parshwanath, who was the 23rd Jain Tirthankara. This is one of the most famous and important Jain temples in Kolkata. Devout Jains, foreigners, visitors and pilgrims of other faiths from distant parts of India visit the temple precincts year round. The image of Lord Shitalanatha is seated in the sanctum sanctorum (inner chamber of the main temple) and his diamond-studded forehead is a major attraction for visitors.

Two other shrines are dedicated to Chanda Prabhujidev, and Dādābadī guru Shri Jin Kushal Suriji Maharaj. The last temple is dedicated to Lord Mahavira, who was the last Tirthankara of the Jain tradition.

== Architecture ==
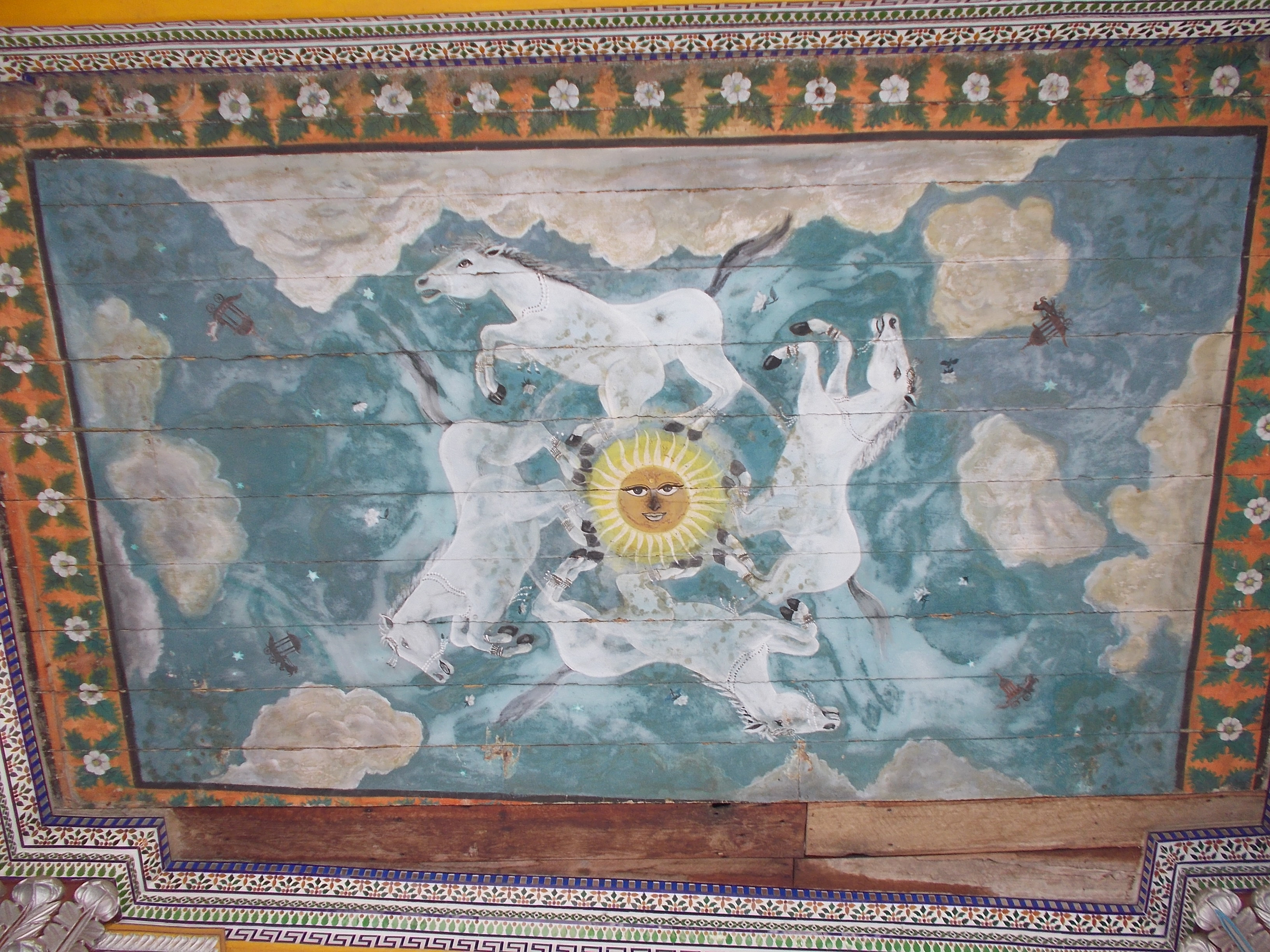
Temple ceiling painting

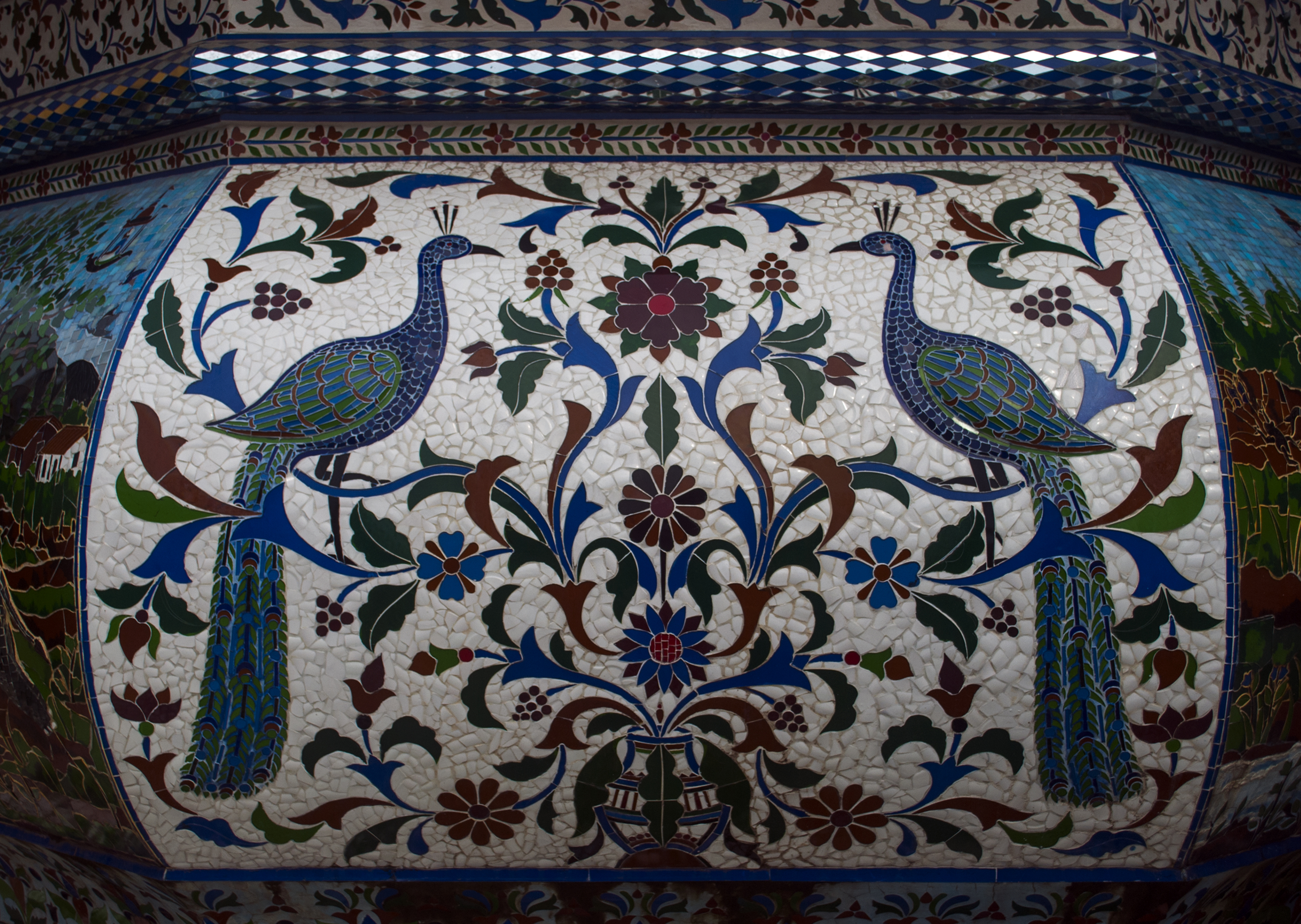
Mosaic on temple wall

Parshwanatha temple has exquisite displays of murals, paintings and mosaic designs. It is an impressive structure consisting of mirror-inlaid pillars and windows of stained glass. The temple is surrounded by three beautiful verandas. The walls of the temple features mosaics and other ornamental work.

The main shrine is divided into three sections. The innermost section enshrines images of Tirthankaras. The marble images may wear gold necklaces, have a diamond-inlaid forehead, and sit upon silver lotus pedestals. The floor of the temple is elaborately paved with marble that gives it a solemn look and also a mark of purity. The walls, ceiling, and columns of the shrine's outer section is richly decorated with ornate mosaic glasswork. The doors of the congregation hall display paintings by renowned artist Ganesh Muskare. The outer section also features a chandelier of unique Jain design with over a hundred branches. Known as jhar battis, these chandeliers are another feature that make the interiors sparkle, lending a delightful radiance to the calm serenity of the temple dedicated to ahimsa, or non-violence.

Outside of the temple is a garden with Indian and other exotic plants, complemented by sculptures and fountains. A small stream flowing through the garden, bordered by a great variety of flowers. Water seems to gush from several sides of the fountain in a harmony of brilliance. A well-maintained reservoir adds up to the surrounding beauty. Colorful fish swarm the surface of the glistening water at the slightest hint of food given by caretakers.

Overall, Parshwanatha temple is considered a rich and vibrant testimony to Jain architecture and artistry.

== Temple Complex ==
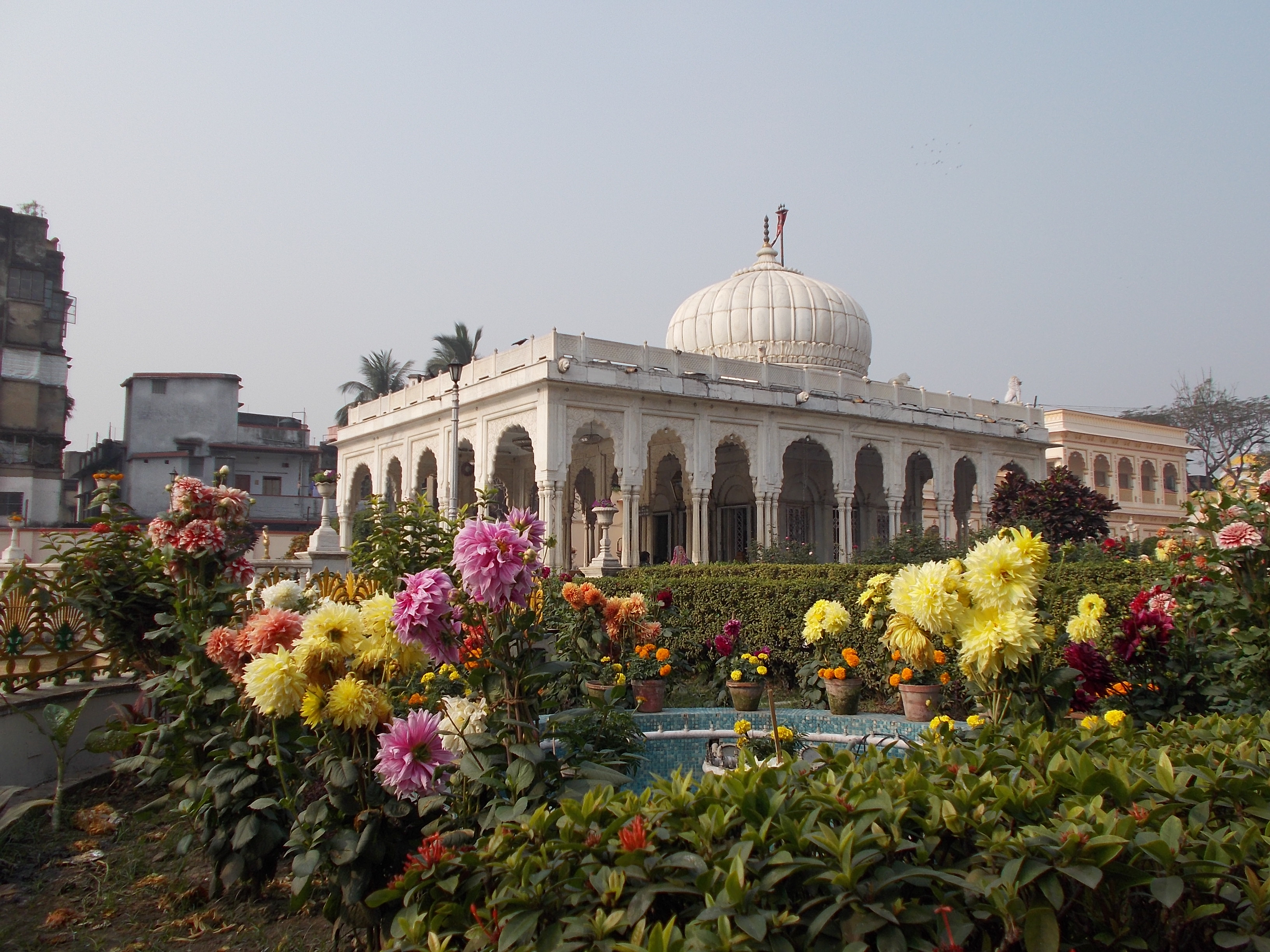
Dādābadī

The interiors of the temple are lavishly decorated with high quality mirrors and stained glass. The quintessential Jain temple chandeliers (jhar battis) decorate the ceilings. The floor is paved with marble and embellished with exquisite floral designs. Temple walls and some congregational hall doors are adorned by paintings of the renowned painter Ganesh Muskare.

== Other Notes ==
Inside the sanctum sanctorum, there is a lamp fueled by ghee (clarified butter) that has been continuously burning since the initiation of the temple in 1867. This lamp represents a silent acknowledgement of very practical mysticism in our contemporary world. It is wonderful to contemplate this. Jains believe in Ahimsa or peace and are committed to charitable deeds. Like a continually burning flame, ahimsa creates a light of peace, reconciliation, human harmony and mutual love.

== Gallery ==
Chandraprabhu Temple

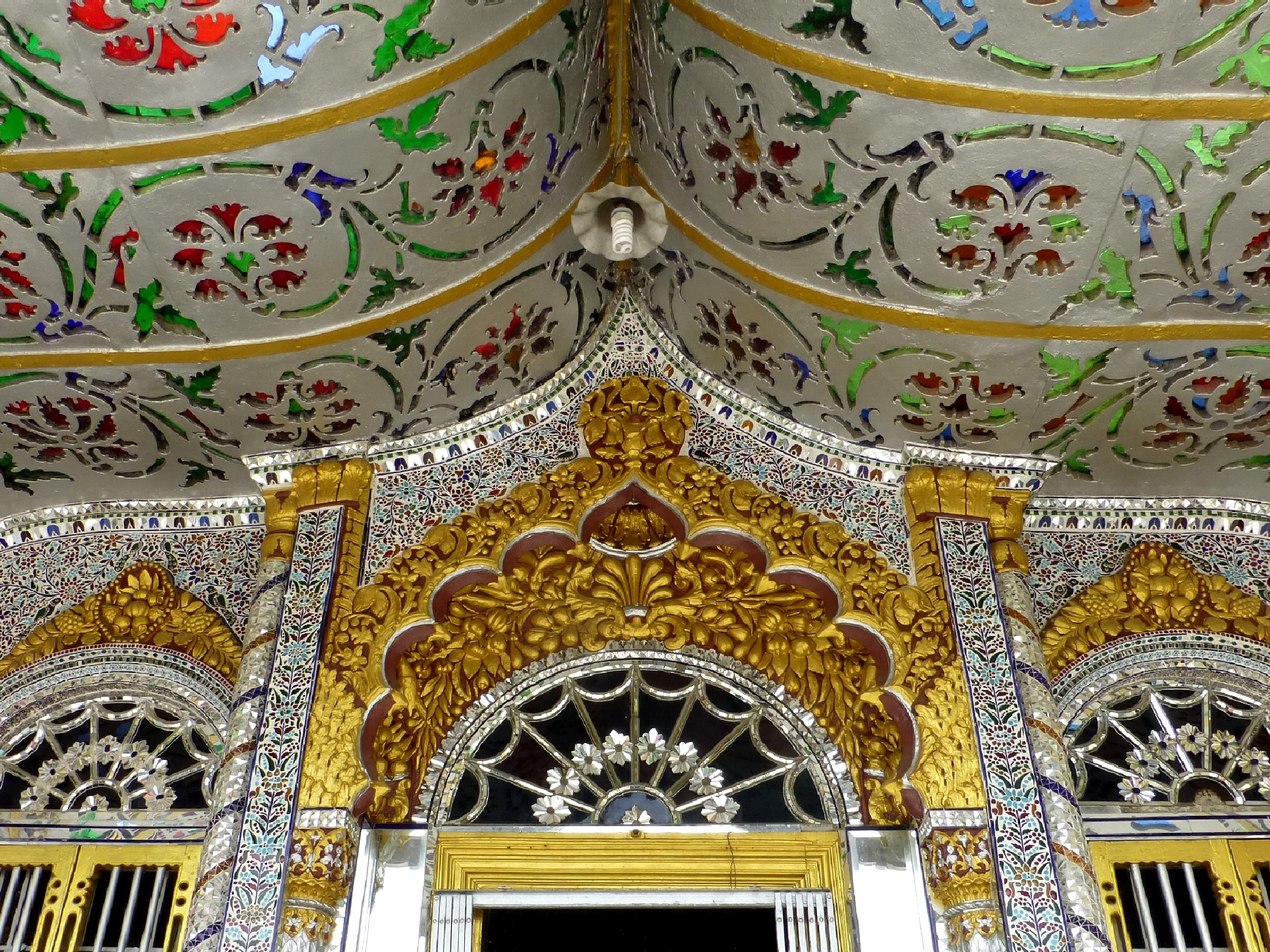
Glass Temple Pareshnath Jain Temple

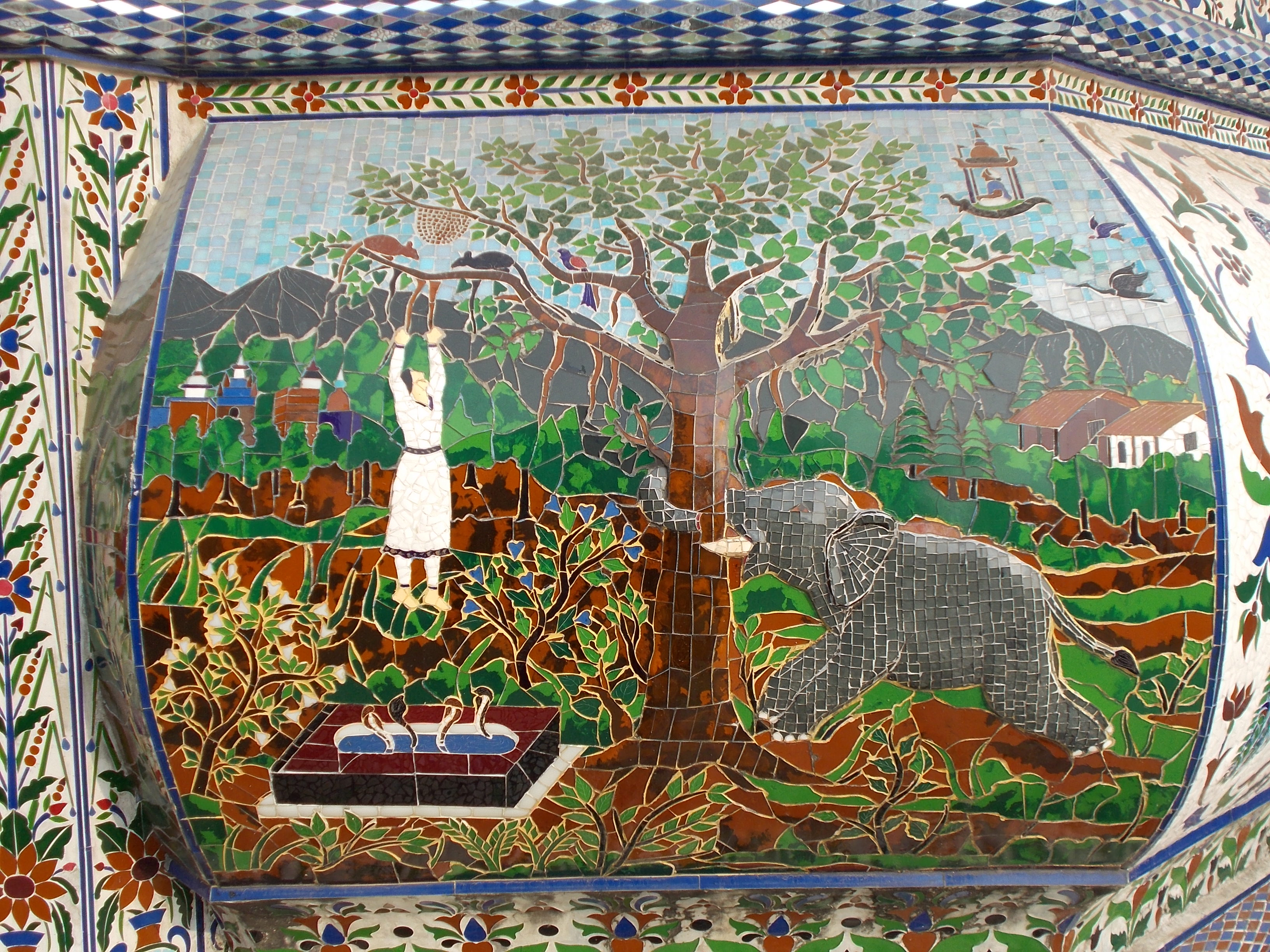
Mosaic on temple wall

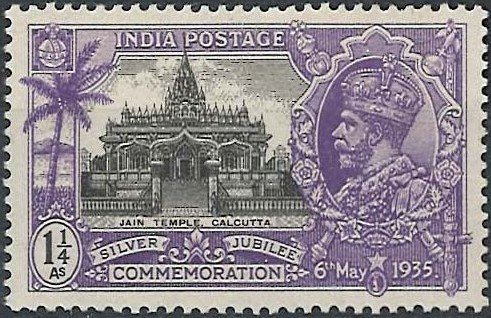
Stamp issued in 1935

== See also ==
- Jainism in Bengal
