= Shitalanatha =

10th Tirthankara in Jainism

- 10th Jain Tirthankara
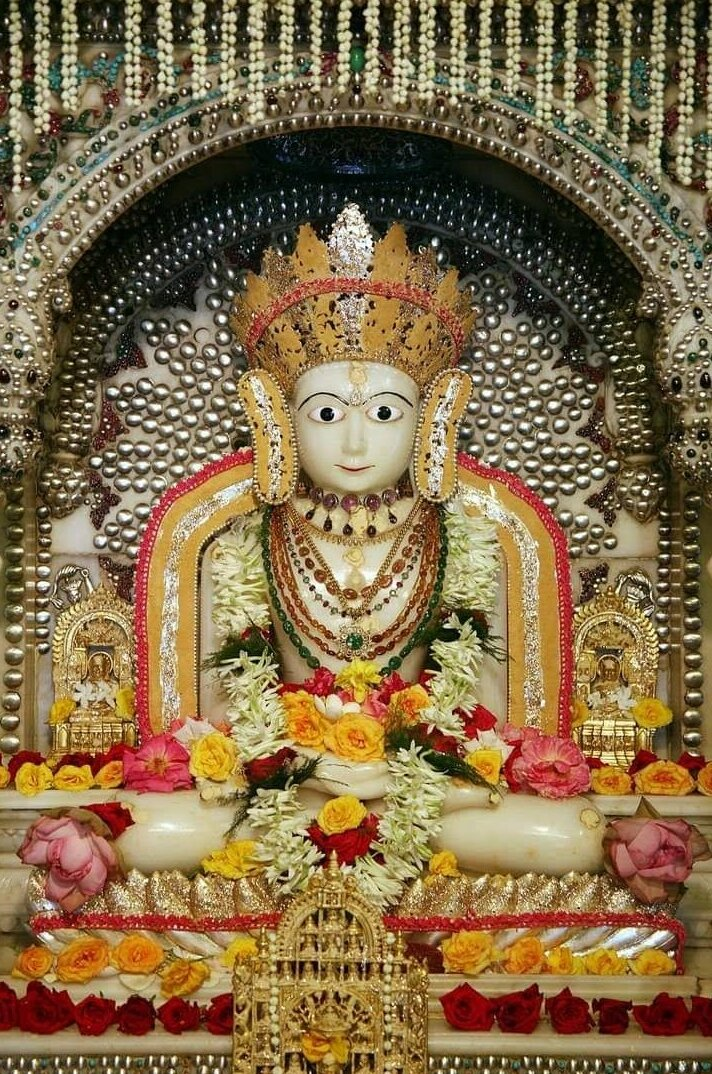
- Shri Shitalanatha bhagwan at Badridas Jain temple, Kolkata
- Venerated in: Jainism
- Predecessor: Pushpadanta
- Successor: Shreyansanatha
- Symbol: Kalpavriksha (Wishing Tree) As per Digambar. Srivatsa as per Shwetambar
- Height: 90 bows (270 meters)
- Age: 100,000 purva (7.056 Quintillion years)
- Color: Golden

Genealogy
- Born: Bhaddilpur
- Died: Shikharji
- Parents: Dridharatha (father); Sunanda (mother)
- Dynasty: Ikṣvākuvaṁśa

Shitalanatha was the tenth tirthankara of the present age according to Jainism. According to Jain beliefs, he became a siddha, a liberated soul which has destroyed all of its karma. Jains believe Shitalanatha was born to King Dradhrath and Queen Nanda at Bhaddilpur into the Ikshvaku dynasty. His birth date was the twelfth day of the Magha Krishna month of the Indian national calendar. Shitalanatha is associated with Svastika (Dig.)/ Srivatasa (Svet.) emblem, Pilurikha tree, Brahma Yaksha and Manavi (Dig.) & Ashoka (Svet.) Yakshi.

== Life and legends ==
According to Jain tradition, Shitalanatha is venerated as the 10th tirthankara of the present cosmic age (avasarpini). Jain universal history states that he was born into the ancient Ikshvaku dynasty to King Dradhratha and Queen Nanda in the city of Bhaddilpur. His birth is traditionally observed on the twelfth day of the Magha Krishna month of the Jain calendar. Within the expansive framework of Jain cosmology, texts attribute to him a symbolic lifespan of 100,000 purvas and a towering physical height of 90 bows (dhanushas). After a period of ruling his kingdom, traditional narratives describe him renouncing worldly attachments to become an ascetic, eventually attaining omniscience (Kevala Jnana). Following a long period of preaching, he ultimately achieved liberation from the cycle of rebirth (moksha) on the sacred peaks of Mount Shikharji in modern-day Jharkhand.

Shitalanatha is said to have been born 9 crore sagara after his predecessor, Pushpadanta. His successor, Shreyansanatha, is said to have been born 9,999,900 sagara after him.

== Iconography ==
In Jain art and sculpture, Shitalanatha is traditionally depicted in a meditative posture and is distinctly identified by his golden physical complexion. His specific iconographic emblem varies significantly between sectarian traditions; the Digambara sect associates him with the wishing tree (Kalpavriksha) or Swastika, while the Śvētāmbara tradition identifies his symbol as the Srivatsa mark. As with all tirthankaras, he is depicted alongside his dedicated guardian deities (Shashan-devatas). According to both traditions, his accompanying male guardian deity (yaksha) is Brahma. However, sectarian texts differ regarding his female guardian (yakshi), with the Digambara sect identifying her as Manavi and the Śvētāmbara sect identifying her as Ashoka.

== Temples and legacy ==
As the 10th tirthankara, Shitalanatha is actively venerated across the Indian subcontinent.

=== Places of birth and liberation ===
Marking the geographic site of his ultimate spiritual liberation, a dedicated shrine (tonk) enshrining his footprints (charan) remains a major pan-Indian pilgrimage destination on the peaks of Mount Shikharji.

=== Other temples ===
One of the most prominent modern architectural monuments dedicated to his worship is the Calcutta Jain Temple (also known as the Badridas Temple) in Kolkata, West Bengal. Constructed in 1867 by the influential merchant Seth Badridas, this spectacularly ornate temple complex serves as a major spiritual and cultural hub for the regional Śvētāmbara community and features Shitalanatha as its primary enshrined deity (mulnayak).

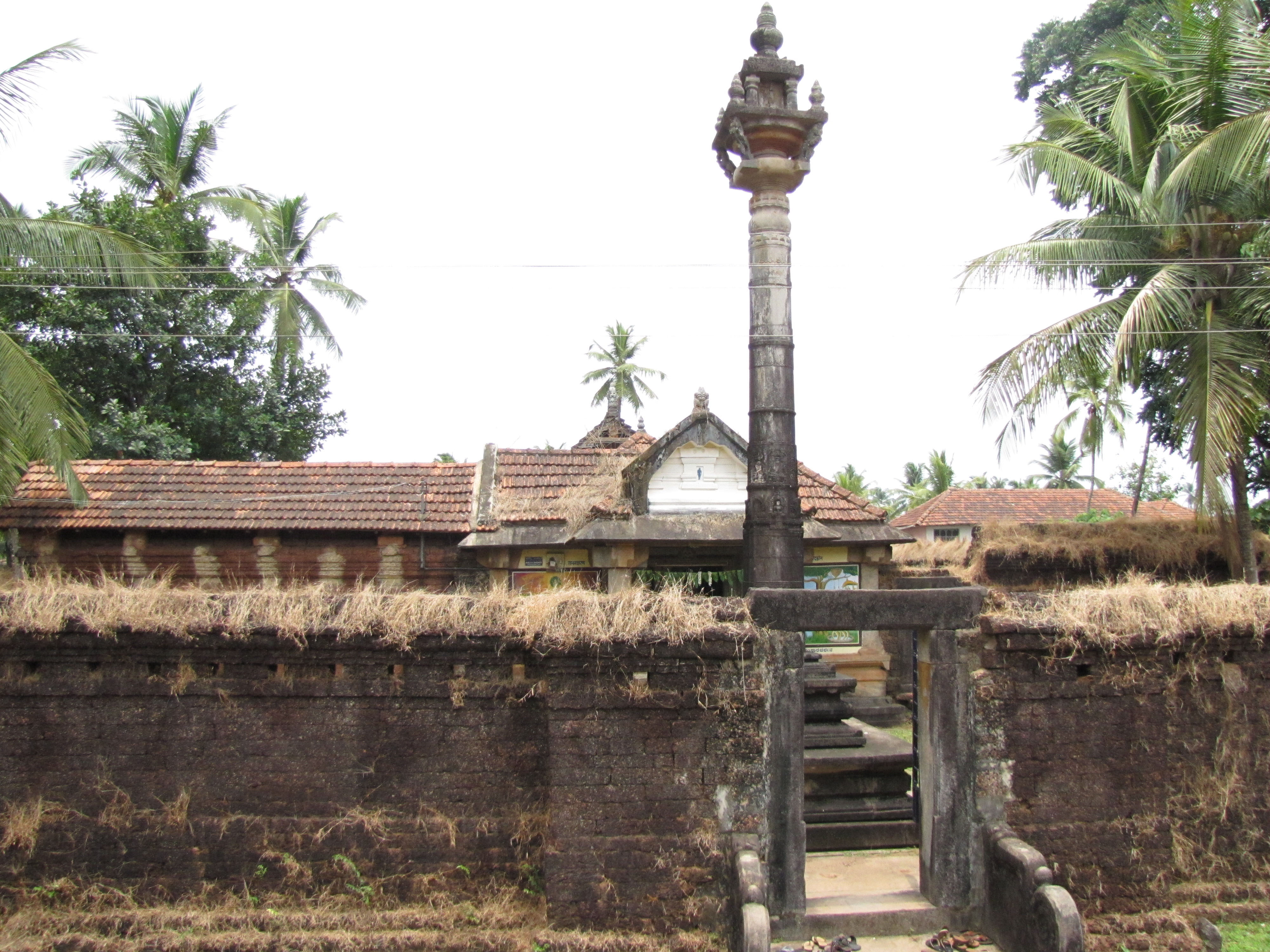
Kallu Basadi, Moodbidri

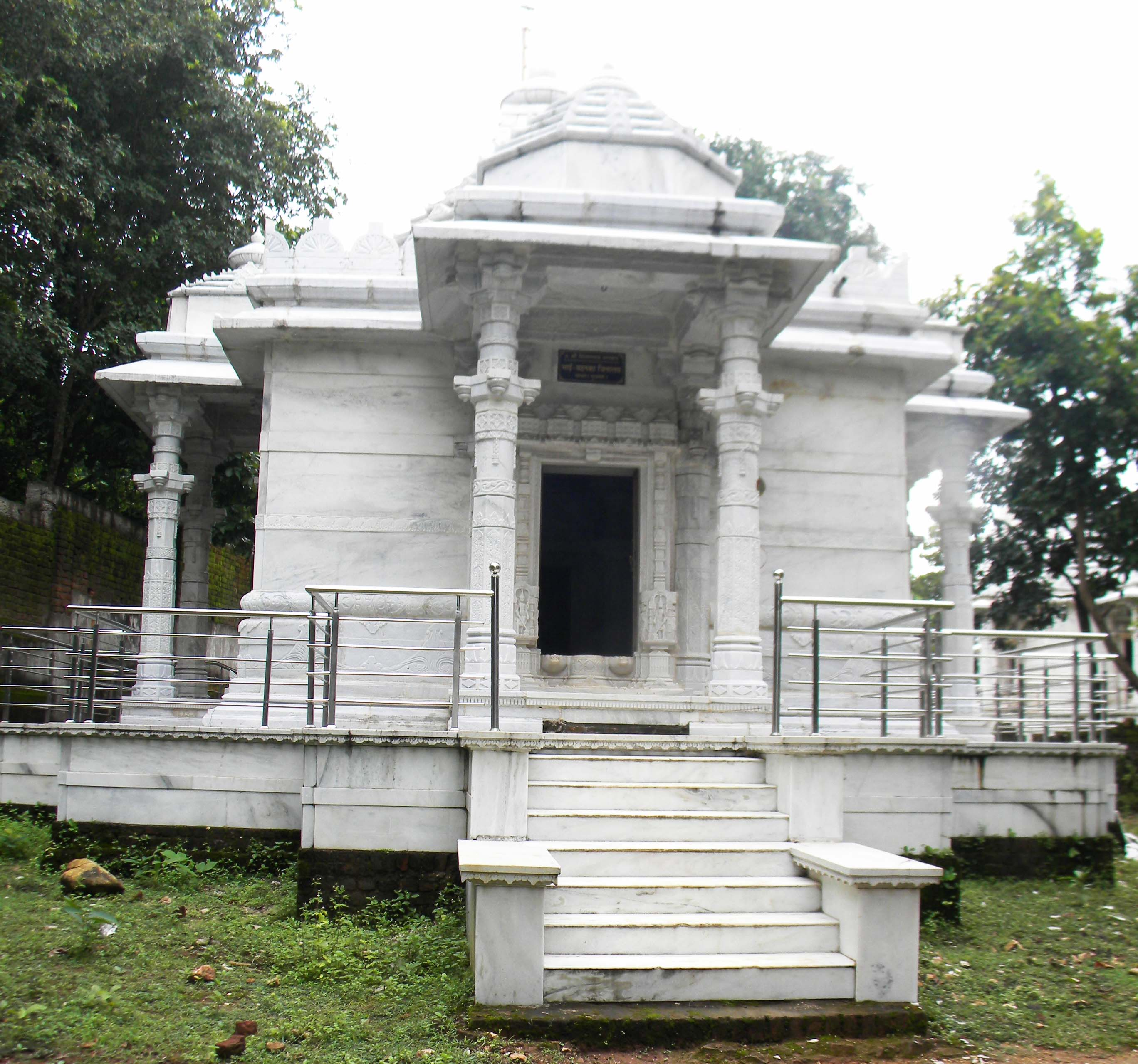
Shitalanatha Temple, Madhuban, Giridih

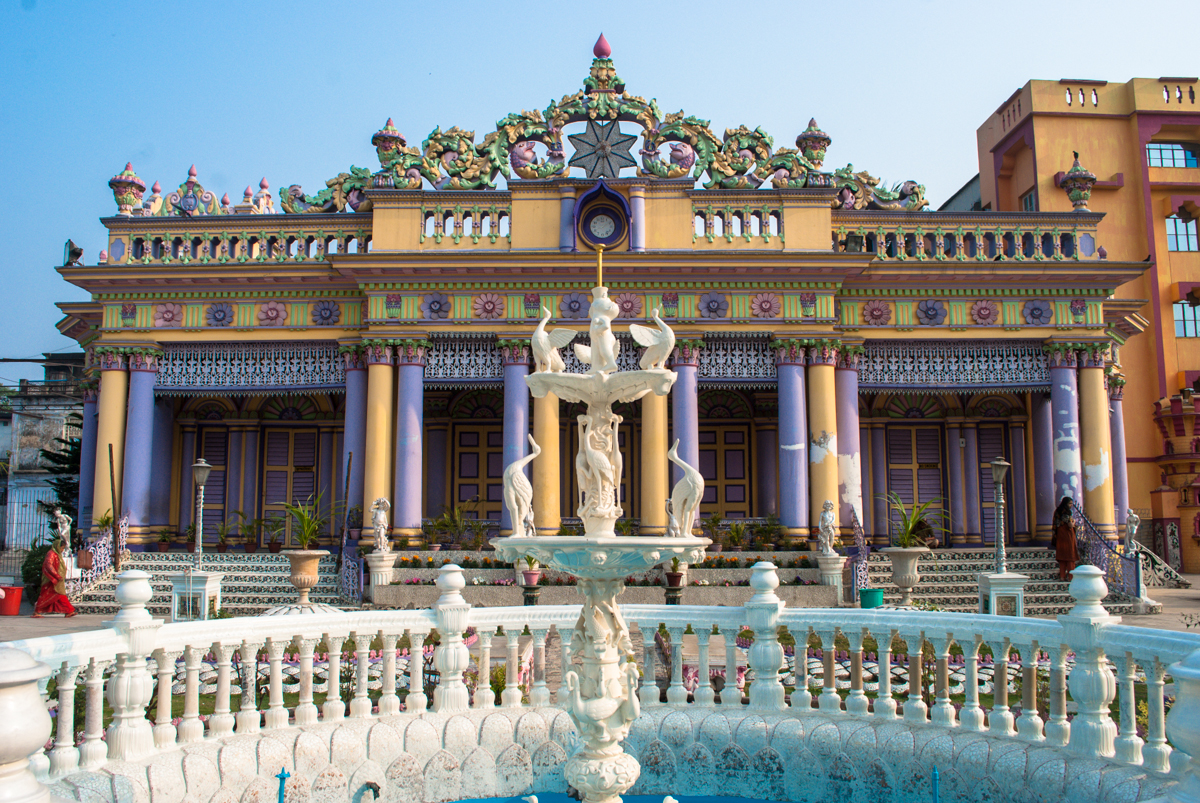
Shitalanatha Temple, Kolkata

== See also ==
- God in Jainism
- Arihant (Jainism)
- Jainism and non-creationism
