= Abhinandananatha =

Fourth Tirthankara in Jainism

- 4th Jain Tirthankara
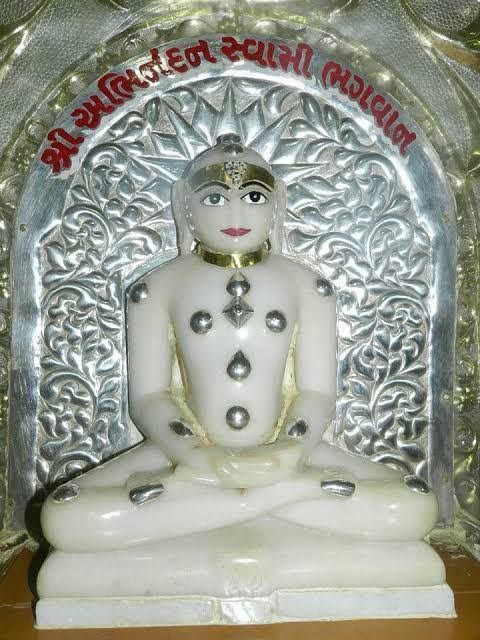
- 4th Tirthankar of Jainism in the present half time cycle
- Other names: Abhinandana Swami
- Venerated in: Jainism
- Predecessor: Sambhavanatha
- Successor: Sumatinatha
- Symbol: Monkey
- Height: 350 dhanusha (1,050 meters)
- Age: 5,000,000 purva (352.80 Quintillion Years)
- Color: Golden

Genealogy
- Born: Ayodhya
- Died: Sammed Shikhar
- Parents: Samvara (father); Siddhārthā (mother)
- Dynasty: Ikṣvākuvaṁśa

Abhinandananatha (also known as Abhinandana Swami) is venerated as the fourth tirthankara (ford-maker) of the current cosmic age (avasarpini). According to Jain universal history, he was born into the ancient Ikshvaku dynasty to King Samvara and Queen Siddhartha in the revered city of Ayodhya. Following a period of royal life, traditional accounts describe him renouncing his kingdom to become an ascetic, eventually attaining omniscience (Kevala Jnana) beneath a priyangu tree (Aglaia elaeagnoidea). He ultimately achieved spiritual liberation from the cycle of rebirth (moksha) on the sacred peaks of Mount Shikharji in modern-day Jharkhand.

In Jain art and iconography, Abhinandananatha is traditionally depicted in a meditative posture with a golden physical complexion. He is distinctly identified by his unique iconographic emblem, the monkey (or ape), which is typically carved onto the pedestal of his idols. Beyond physical monuments, his spiritual accomplishments are famously praised in the Svayambhustotra, a foundational devotional text composed by the prominent Jain monk Acharya Samantabhadra.

As a foundational spiritual figure, Abhinandananatha is actively venerated across the Indian subcontinent. Major architectural monuments and pilgrimage centers dedicated to his worship span multiple regions, including the Abhinandanoday Teerth Kshetra in Uttar Pradesh, the historically significant temple complex in Golakot, and the classic 16th-century four-faced stone monument, Chaturmukha Basadi, Gerusoppa, in Karnataka.

== Life and legends ==
According to Jain tradition, Abhinandananatha (also known as Abhinandana Swami) is venerated as the fourth tirthankara of the present cosmic age (avasarpini). Jain universal history states that he was born into the ancient Ikshvaku dynasty to King Samvara and Queen Siddhartha in the revered city of Ayodhya. His birth is traditionally observed on the second day of the Magha Shukla month of the lunisolar Jain calendar. Within the expansive framework of Jain cosmology, texts attribute to him a symbolic lifespan of 5,000,000 purvas and a towering physical height of 350 bows (dhanushas) (1,050 meters).

Following a period of ruling his kingdom, traditional narratives describe him renouncing worldly attachments to become an ascetic. He is said to have attained omniscience (Kevala Jnana) while meditating beneath a priyangu tree (Aglaia elaeagnoidea). Following a long period of preaching the doctrines of Jainism, he ultimately achieved liberation from the cycle of rebirth (moksha) on the sacred peaks of Mount Shikharji in modern-day Jharkhand.

Abhinandananatha is said to have been born 10 lakh crore sagara after his predecessor, Sambhavanatha. His successor, Sumatinatha, is said to have been born 9 lakh crore sagara after him.

== Iconography ==
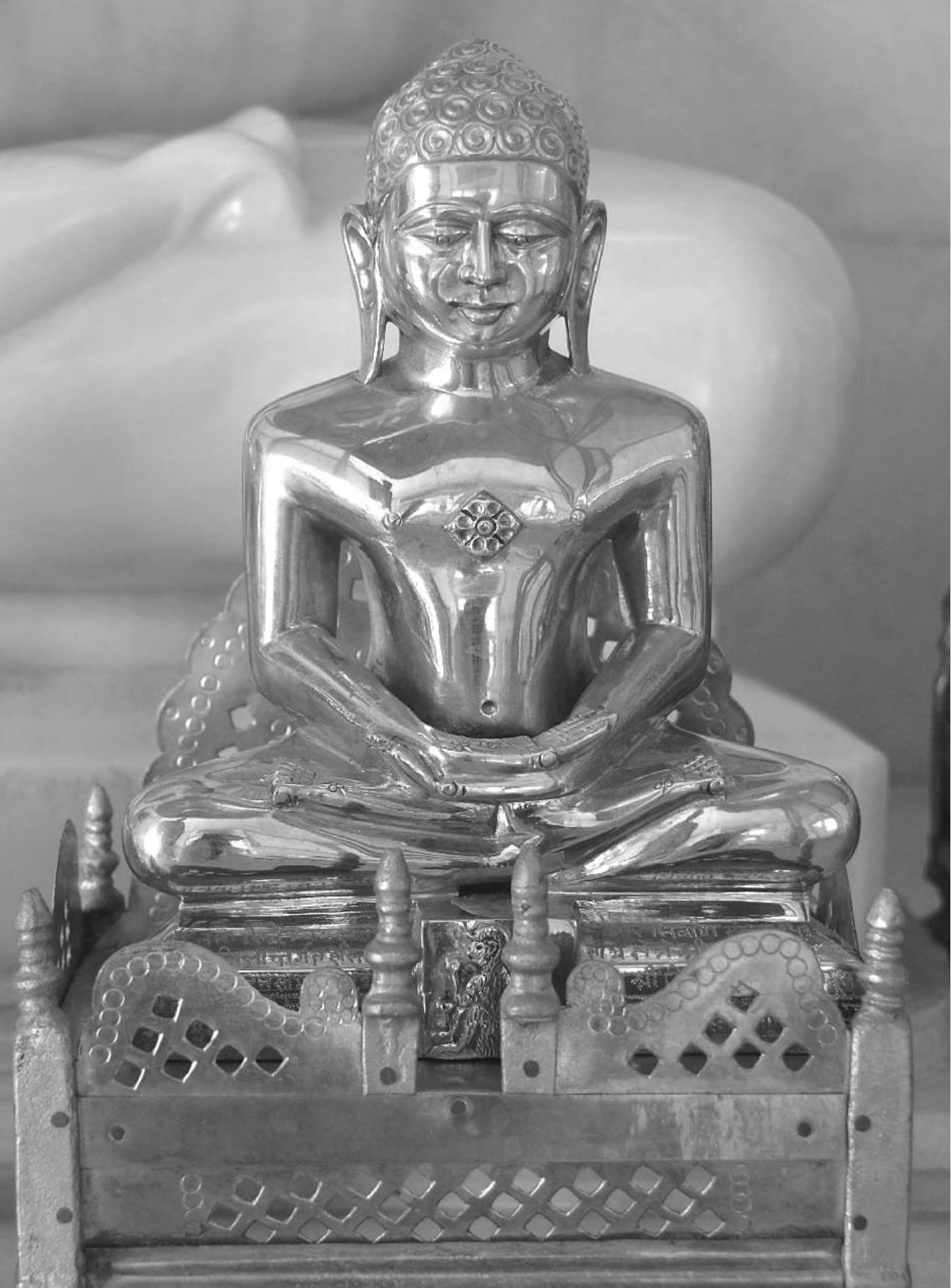
Digambara depiction of Abhinandananatha metal statue

In Jain art and sculpture, Abhinandananatha is traditionally depicted in a meditative posture and is distinctly identified by his golden physical complexion. He is explicitly recognized by his unique iconographic emblem, the monkey (or ape), which is typically carved or stamped onto the pedestal beneath his idols. As with all tirthankaras, he is depicted alongside his dedicated guardian deities (Shashan-devatas). According to sectarian traditions, his accompanying male guardian deity (yaksha) is identified as Yakshesvara by the Digambara sect and Nayaka by the Śvētāmbara sect. Similarly, iconographic texts differ regarding his female guardian (yakshi), with the Digambara sect identifying her as Vajrasrinkala and the Śvētāmbara sect identifying her as Kalika.

== Adoration ==
Svayambhustotra by Jain monk, Acarya Samantabhadra is the adoration of twenty-four tirthankaras. Its five shlokas (aphorisms) adore the qualities of Abhinandananātha. One such shloka is:

By constantly feeding the body to subdue inflictions like hunger, and by indulging in transient pleasures of the senses, neither the body nor the soul remains unscathed. Such deeds thus benefit neither the body nor the soul; O Lord Abhinandananātha, you had thus expounded the true nature of reality.

Abhinandananatha is associated with Ape emblem, Piyala tree, Yakshesvara and Nayaka Yaksha, and Vajrasrinkala and Kalika Yakshi.

== Temples and legacy ==
As the fourth tirthankara, Abhinandananatha is venerated across the Indian subcontinent, with several historically and architecturally significant temple complexes dedicated to his worship.

=== Places of birth and liberation ===
According to Jain tradition, Abhinandananatha was born in Ayodhya, making the city a traditional geographic center for his veneration.

In Jainism, Sammed Shikharji (located on Parasnath Hill in Jharkhand) serves as the geographical location where 20 of the 24 tirthankaras attained liberation. According to Jain texts, Abhinandananatha attained ultimate spiritual liberation at this site alongside 1,000 other ascetic monks. The specific hilltop shrine (tonk) dedicated to his liberation is known as Anand Koot. Instead of a traditional idol, this tonk enshrines his footprints (charan), which are actively worshipped by pilgrims from both the Digambara and Śvētāmbara sects.

=== Other temples ===
In northern India, the Abhinandanoday Teerth Kshetra, located in the Lalitpur district of Uttar Pradesh, serves as a major regional pilgrimage center for the Jain community. Additionally, the historically significant temple complex in Golakot features prominent architectural dedications to his veneration, serving as an important spiritual node in the region.

In southern India, the Chaturmukha Basadi, Gerusoppa, Karnataka, stands as a premier architectural monument associated with his worship. Constructed during the 16th century, this classic four-faced (chaturmukha) stone temple reflects traditional Dravidian Jain architecture and enshrines idols facing all four cardinal directions.

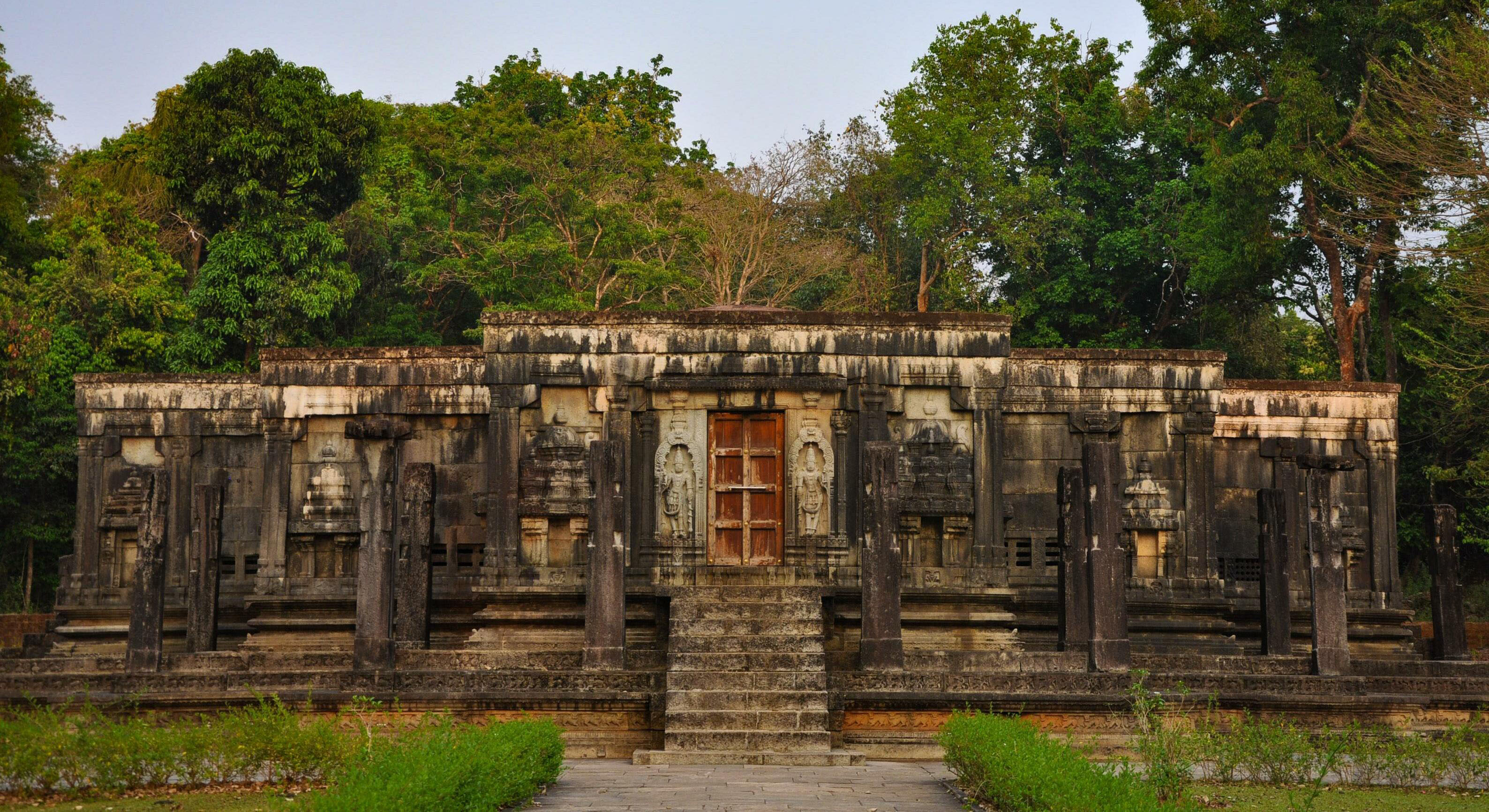
Chaturmukha Basadi, Gerusoppa

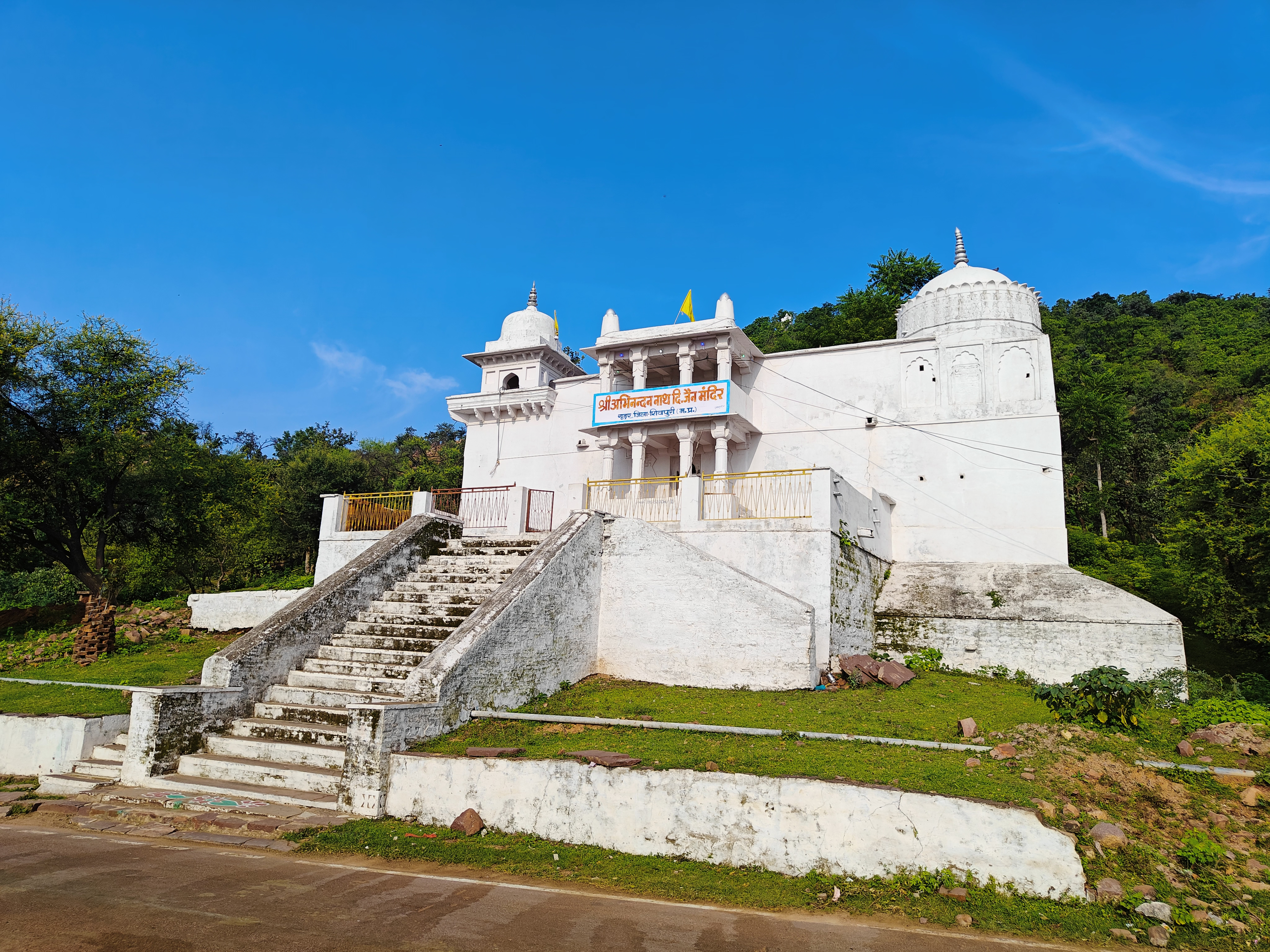
Abhinandananatha temple, Golakot

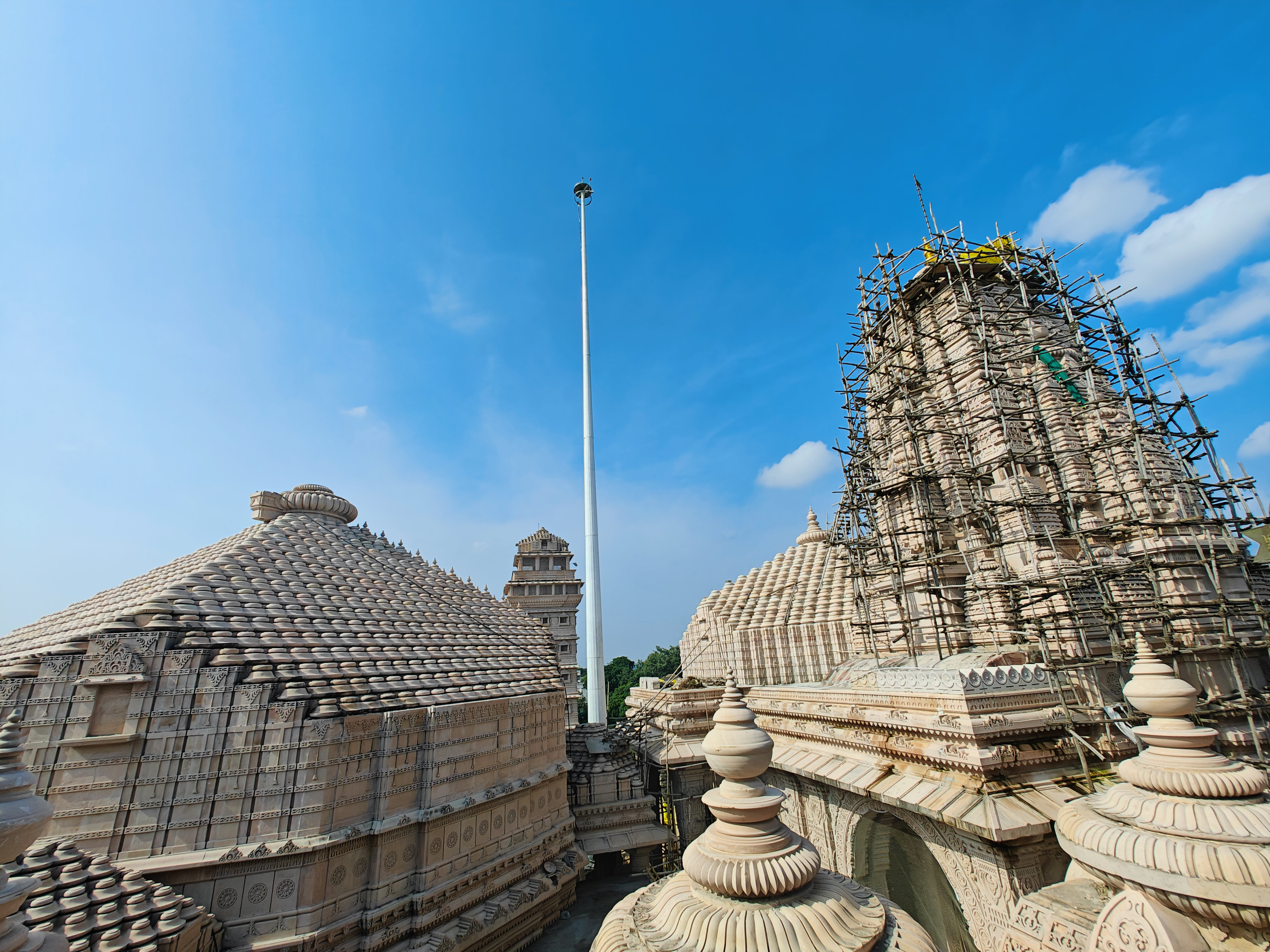
Abhinandanoday Teerth Kshetra, Lalitpur

== See also ==
- God in Jainism
- Arihant (Jainism)
- Jainism and non-creationism
