= Sumatinatha =

5th Tirthankara in Jainism

- 5th Jain Tirthankara
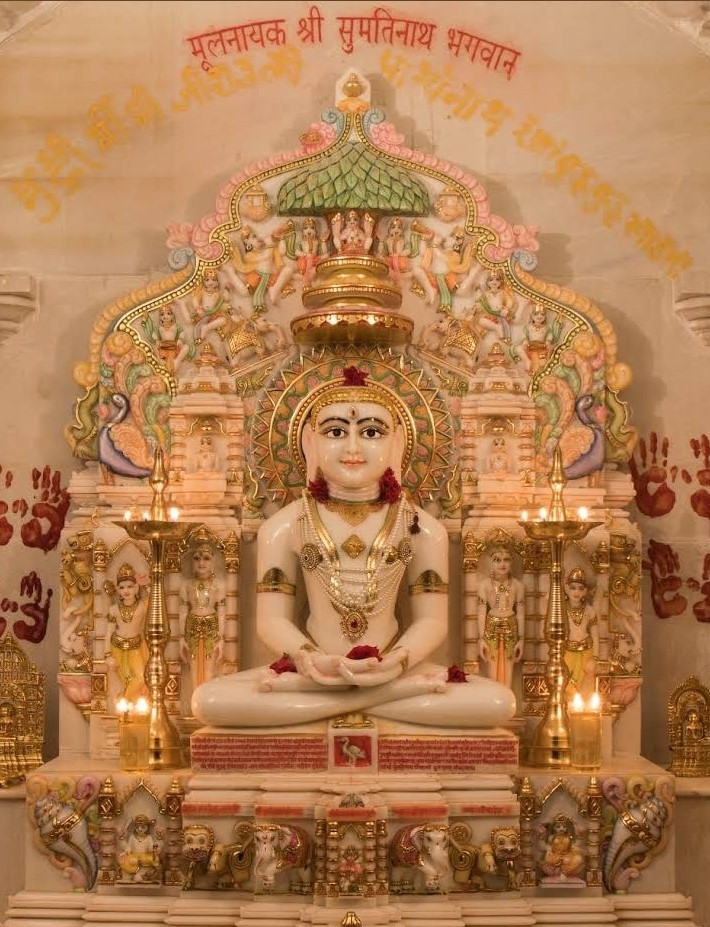
- Tirtankara Sumatinatha at Vile Parle, Mumbai
- Venerated in: Jainism
- Predecessor: Abhinandananatha
- Successor: Padmaprabha
- Symbol: Goose
- Height: 300 bows (900 meters)
- Age: 4,000,000 purva (282.24 Quintillion Years Old)
- Tree: Priyangu
- Color: Golden

Genealogy
- Born: Ayodhya
- Died: Sammed Shikhar
- Parents: Megharatha (father); Mangalāvatī (mother)
- Dynasty: Ikṣvākuvaṁśa

Sumatinatha is venerated as the fifth tirthankara (ford-maker) of the current cosmic age (avasarpini). According to Jain universal history, he was born into the ancient Ikshvaku dynasty to King Megha (Meghaprabha) and Queen Mangala (Sumangala) in the revered city of Ayodhya. Following a period of royal life, traditional accounts describe him renouncing his kingdom to become an ascetic, eventually attaining omniscience (Kevala Jnana) beneath a priyangu or sala tree. He ultimately achieved spiritual liberation from the cycle of rebirth (moksha) on the sacred peaks of Mount Shikharji in modern-day Jharkhand.

In Jain art and iconography, Sumatinatha is traditionally depicted in a meditative posture with a golden physical complexion. He is distinctly identified by his unique iconographic emblem, the heron or red goose (krauncha), which is typically carved onto the pedestal of his idols.

As a foundational spiritual figure, Sumatinatha is actively venerated across the Indian subcontinent. Major architectural monuments and pilgrimage centers dedicated to his worship span multiple regions, including the highly renowned 15th-century Bhandasar Jain Temple in Bikaner, Rajasthan, and the ancient temple complex at Talaja, Bhavnagar in Gujarat.

== Life and legends ==
According to Jain tradition, Sumatinatha is venerated as the fifth tirthankara of the present cosmic age (avasarpini). Jain universal history, which charts his soul's progression, states that in his previous incarnation, he existed as an Indra deity within the Jayanta Vimana heavenly realm. In his final earthly incarnation, he was born into the ancient Ikshvaku dynasty to the Kshatriya King Megha (also known as Meghaprabha) and Queen Mangala (Sumangala) in the revered city of Ayodhya. His birth is traditionally observed on the eighth day of the Vaisakha Sudi month of the lunisolar Jain calendar. Within the expansive framework of Jain cosmology, texts attribute to him a symbolic lifespan of 4,000,000 purvas and a towering physical height of 300 bows (dhanushas) (900 meters).

Following a period of ruling his kingdom, traditional narratives describe him renouncing worldly attachments to become an ascetic. He is said to have attained omniscience (Kevala Jnana) while meditating beneath a priyangu (Aglaia elaeagnoidea) or sala tree (Shorea robusta). Following a long period of preaching the doctrines of Jainism, he ultimately achieved spiritual liberation from the cycle of rebirth (moksha) on the sacred peaks of Mount Shikharji in modern-day Jharkhand.

Sumatinatha is said to have been born 9 lakh crore sagara after his predecessor, Abhinandananatha. His successor, Padmaprabha, is said to have been born 90,000 crore sagara after him.

== Iconography ==
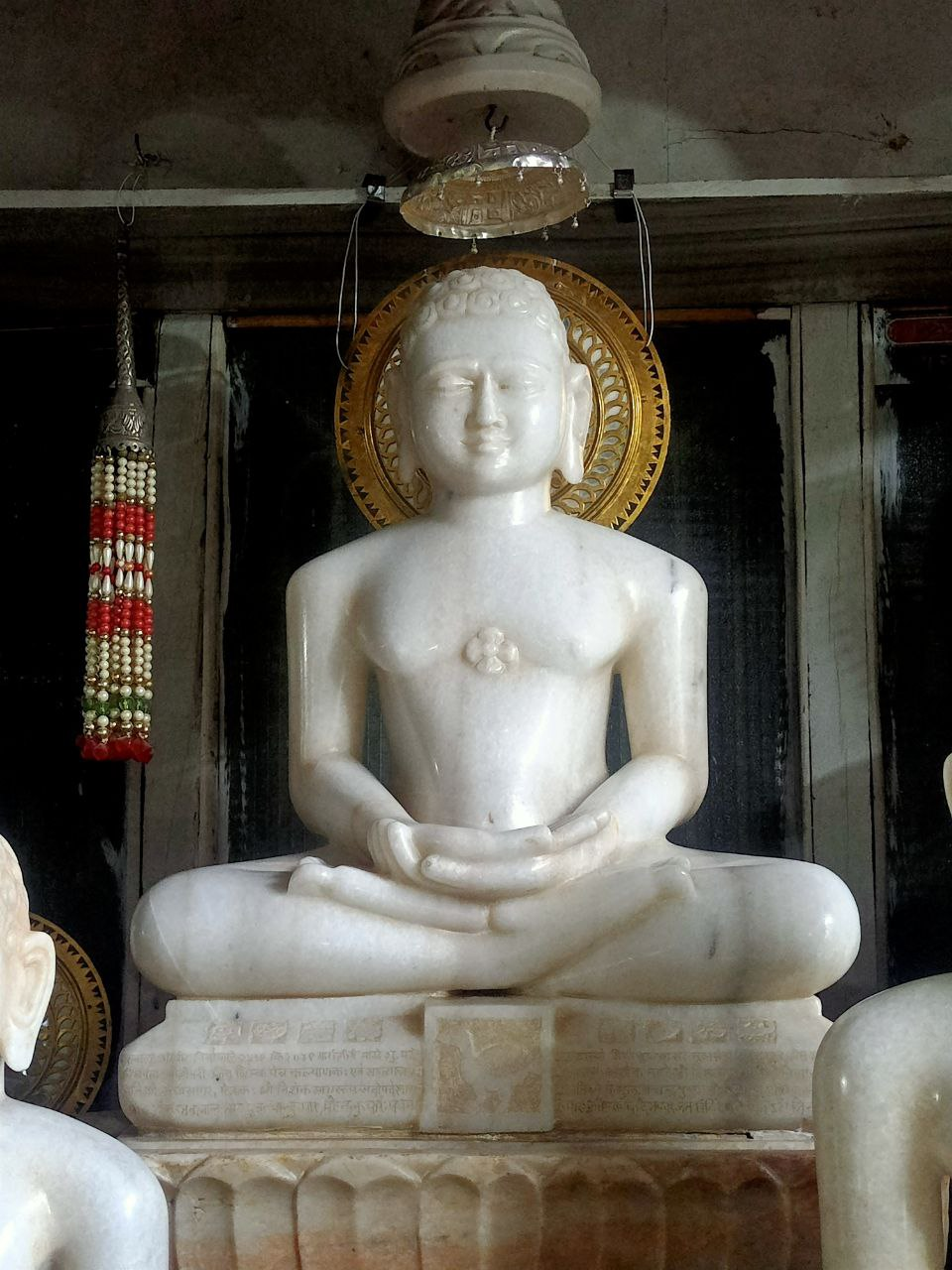
Sumatinatha idol in Digambara depiction

In Jain art and sculpture, Sumatinatha is traditionally depicted in a meditative posture and is distinctly identified by his golden physical complexion. He is explicitly recognized by his unique iconographic emblem, the heron or red goose (krauncha), which is typically carved or stamped onto the pedestal beneath his idols. As with all tirthankaras, he is depicted alongside his dedicated guardian deities (Shashan-devatas). According to sectarian traditions, his accompanying male guardian deity (yaksha) is identified as Tumburu by the Digambara sect and Purushadatta by the Śvētāmbara sect. Furthermore, traditional iconographic texts identify his female guardian (yakshi) as Mahakali (or Mahakala).

== Adoration ==
Svayambhustotra by Acharya Samantabhadra is the adoration of twenty-four tirthankaras. Its five slokas (aphorisms) are dedicated to Sumatinātha. Last of which is:

The attributes of existence and non-existence in an object are valid from particular standpoints; the validity of the statement is contingent on the speaker's choice, at that particular moment, of the attribute that he wishes to bring to the fore as the other attribute is relegated to the background. O Lord Sumatinātha, you had thus explained the reality of substances; may your adoration augment my intellect!

== Temples and legacy ==
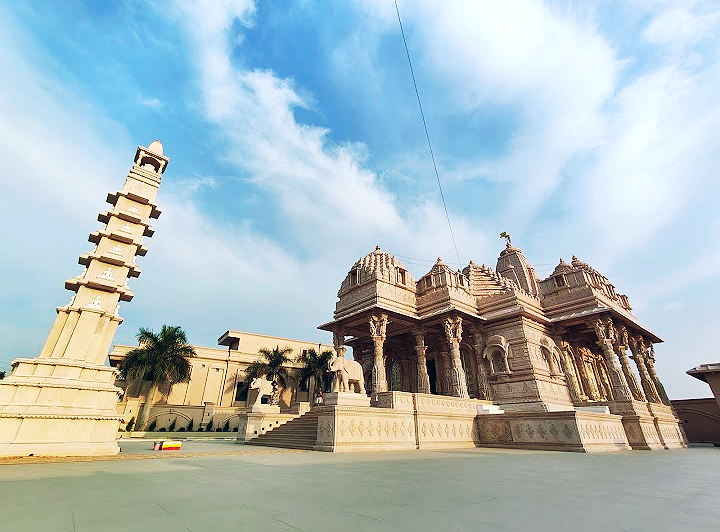
Outer part of Sumati Dham Digambar Jain Temple

As the fifth tirthankara, Sumatinatha is venerated across the Indian subcontinent.

=== Places of birth and liberation ===
The ancient city of Ayodhya, traditionally identified in Jain universal history as his royal birthplace, serves as a primary geographic center for his historical worship. Marking the site of his ultimate spiritual liberation, a dedicated shrine (tonk) enshrining his footprints (charan) is actively venerated by pilgrims on the peaks of Mount Shikharji in modern-day Jharkhand.

=== Other temples ===
In Rajasthan, the Bhandasar Jain Temple in Bikaner stands as one of the most historically and architecturally significant monuments dedicated specifically to his worship. Constructed in the 15th century by a wealthy merchant, this spectacular three-story temple features Sumatinatha as its primary enshrined deity (moolnayak). The temple is highly renowned for its intricate frescoes, vibrant mirror work, and the enduring regional legend that its foundation was poured with clarified butter (ghee) instead of water to withstand the desert climate.

In Gujarat, the ancient temple complex at Talaja, Bhavnagar operates as a major pilgrimage site for the Śvētāmbara sect, forming a crucial spiritual node within the sacred Shatrunjaya hill network. Furthermore, modern devotion continues to expand his architectural legacy, as seen in the establishment of prominent contemporary Digambara complexes like the Sumati Dham in Indore, Madhya Pradesh.

== See also ==
- God in Jainism
- Arihant (Jainism)
- Jainism and non-creationism
