= Don Martino de Zilva Wickremasinghe =

Sri Lankan archaeologist

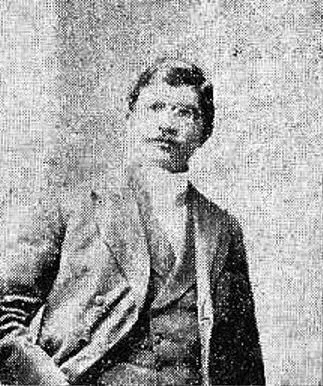
- Born: 1865
- Died: 1937
- Scientific career
- Fields: Epigraphy; Archaeology

Don Martino de Zilva Wickremasinghe (1867–1937) was an epigraphist and archaeologist of Sri Lanka. He studied at Richmond College, Galle. Subsequently, he worked as an assistant to H. C. P. Bell and served as the epigraphist to the Ceylon Government. He became archaeological commissioner after Bell, preceding Senarath Paranavitana in that position. His most important contribution was serving as editor and part author of the first two volumes of Epigraphia Zeylanica, a key source for the early history of Ceylon. He handed responsibility for volume 3 of Epigraphia Zeylanica to Paranavitana "...owing to reasons of health and the multifarious duties at the University of London." During his time in London, Wickremasinghe prepared a catalogue of the Sinhalese books in the library of the British Museum.

== Leading articles ==
- Don Martino De Zilva Wickremasinghe (1865-1937) — Savant, Linguist and Epigraphist … with Notes about HCP Bell, Archaeologist (1851-1937)
- Wickremasinghe, M. d. Z. (1901). "Art. XIII.—The Semitic Origin of the Indian Alphabet." Journal of the Royal Asiatic Society (New Series) 33, no. 2: 301-305.
- Wickremasinghe, M. d. Z. (1931). "On the Etymology and Interpretation of Certain Words and Phrases in the Aśoka Edicts." BSOAS 6, no. 2: 545-548.
