= Golakot Jain temple =

Jain temple complex in Madhya Pradesh, India

Coordinates: 24°58′37″N 78°05′15″E

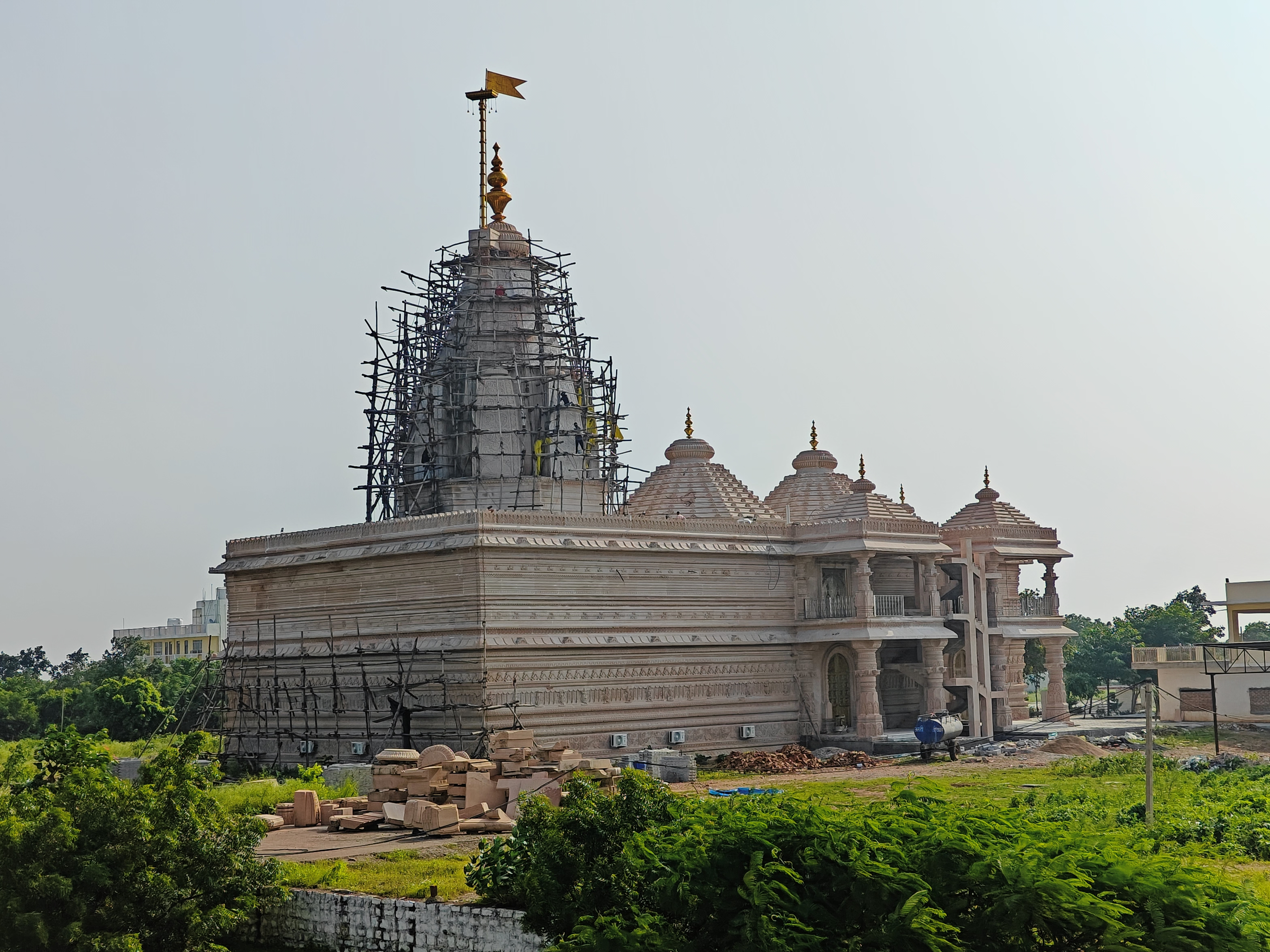
- Golakot Jain temple

Religion
- Affiliation: Jainism
- Deity: Rishabhanatha

Location
- Location: Golakot, Shivpuri

Architecture
- Style: Deccani and Hoysala architecture
- Established: Medieval period
- Temple: 2

Golakot Jain temple is a historic Jain temple complex at Golakot in Madhya Pradesh, India. Art-historical studies identify an Adinatha temple at Golakot and place the Jain remains of the site within the medieval artistic tradition of central India. Golakot is one of several sites in central India where Jain art and architecture developed during the medieval period. Its Jain sculptures have been compared stylistically with those at Deogarh, an important centre of medieval Jain art.

== History ==
The precise date of the establishment of the Jain temple at Golakot is uncertain. Art-historical evidence, however, places its surviving historical material in the medieval period. Peter Flügel, drawing on the classification of art historian Klaus Bruhn, includes Golakot among a group of sites that supply only medieval material. Bruhn associated Jain images from Golakot with those at Deogarh. His comparative study identified sculptures at Golakot, Chandpur, Dudahi, Siron Khurd and Budhi Chanderi as being closely related to the images at Deogarh. The stylistic similarities are sufficiently close that images from some of these sites can be incorporated into groups established for the study of the Deogarh sculptures.

Golakot alongside Sonagiri, Nainagiri, Garha, Pajnari and Ajaigarh among sites in central India where Jain art and architecture developed during the medieval period.

== Architecture ==
The principal structure discussed in modern architectural scholarship is the Adinatha Temple at Golakot. Architectural historian Julia A. B. Hegewald has examined the temple as part of her comparative studies of Jain architecture in India. The Adinatha temple is situated at the end of a spacious courtyard. It has a broad, comparatively shallow arrangement, with an elongated shrine room preceded by an open pillared porch.

Hegewald places the Golakot temple among a group of Jain buildings in central and southern India whose layout resembles contemporary Islamic mosque architecture. These structures are characterised by broad, elongated shrine rooms, open pillared porches and placement at the end of open courtyards rather than by a succession of halls extending along the main axis of approach.

The Adinatha temple at Golakot has a broad porch and a flat shrine section without conventional temple towers. Hegewald notes that these features give the structure a resemblance to the design of local mosques and as an example of the use of flat-roofed pillared halls showing references to Deccani and Hoysala architectural traditions.

== Sculpture and iconography ==
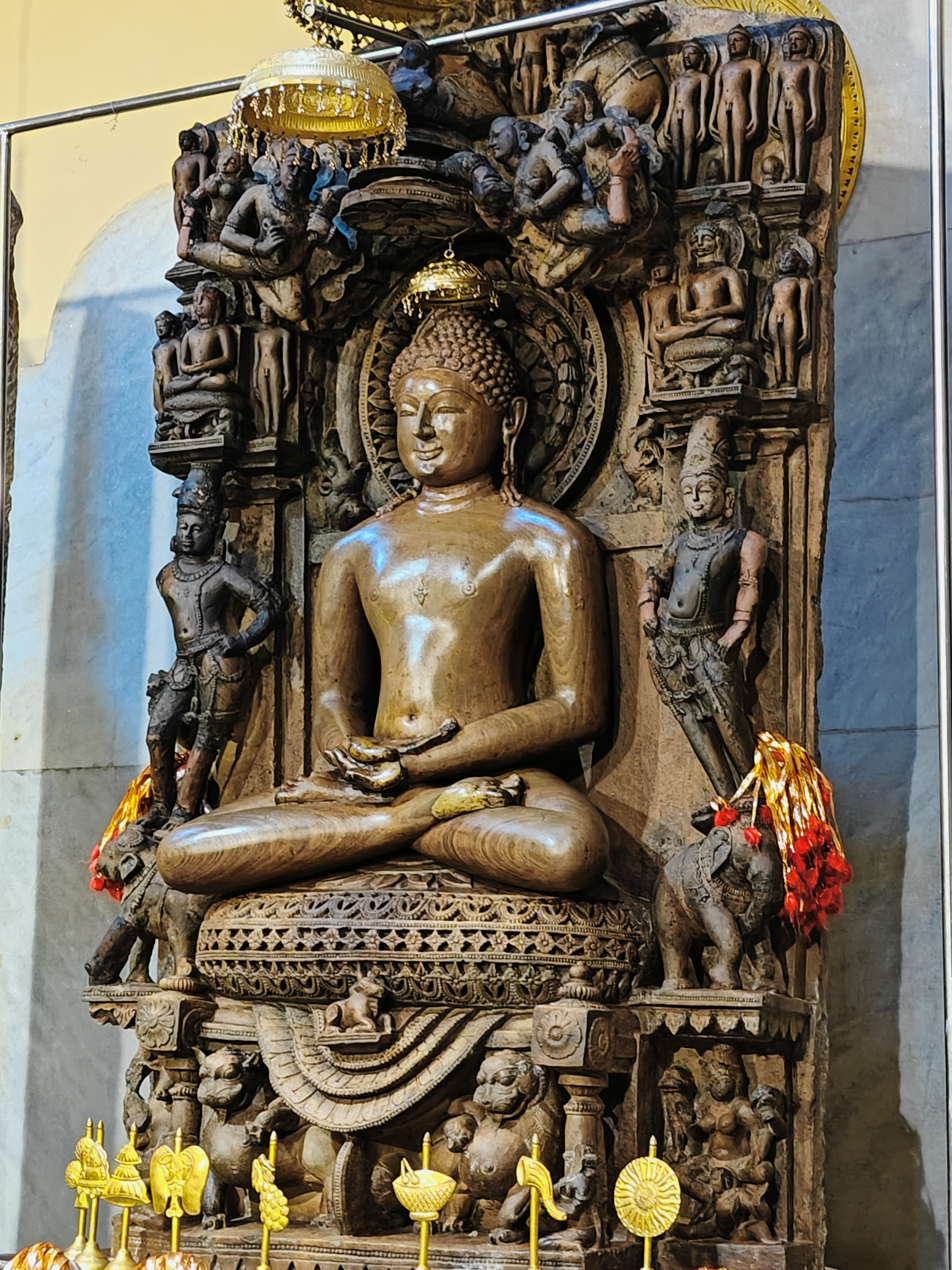
Idol at Golakot Jain temple

Sculptural remains from Golakot include representations of Jain deities and Tirthankaras. Klaus Bruhn discusses an image of Chakreshvari from Golakot in his study of Jain sculpture at Deogarh and related sites. He also records an image of Rishabha from Golakot.

The Jain sculptures at Golakot form part of the wider corpus of medieval Jain sculpture in central India. Bruhn noted stylistic relationships between images from Deogarh and those from Golakot and several neighbouring sites. Flügel subsequently noted that the relationship between the images at Golakot and Deogarh is sufficiently close for material from Golakot to be considered alongside groups of Deogarh images in comparative art-historical analysis.

A distinctive feature of the Adinatha temple is its elongated image chamber. According to Hegewald, the chamber contains seventeen large figural representations of the Jinas.

== Gallery ==
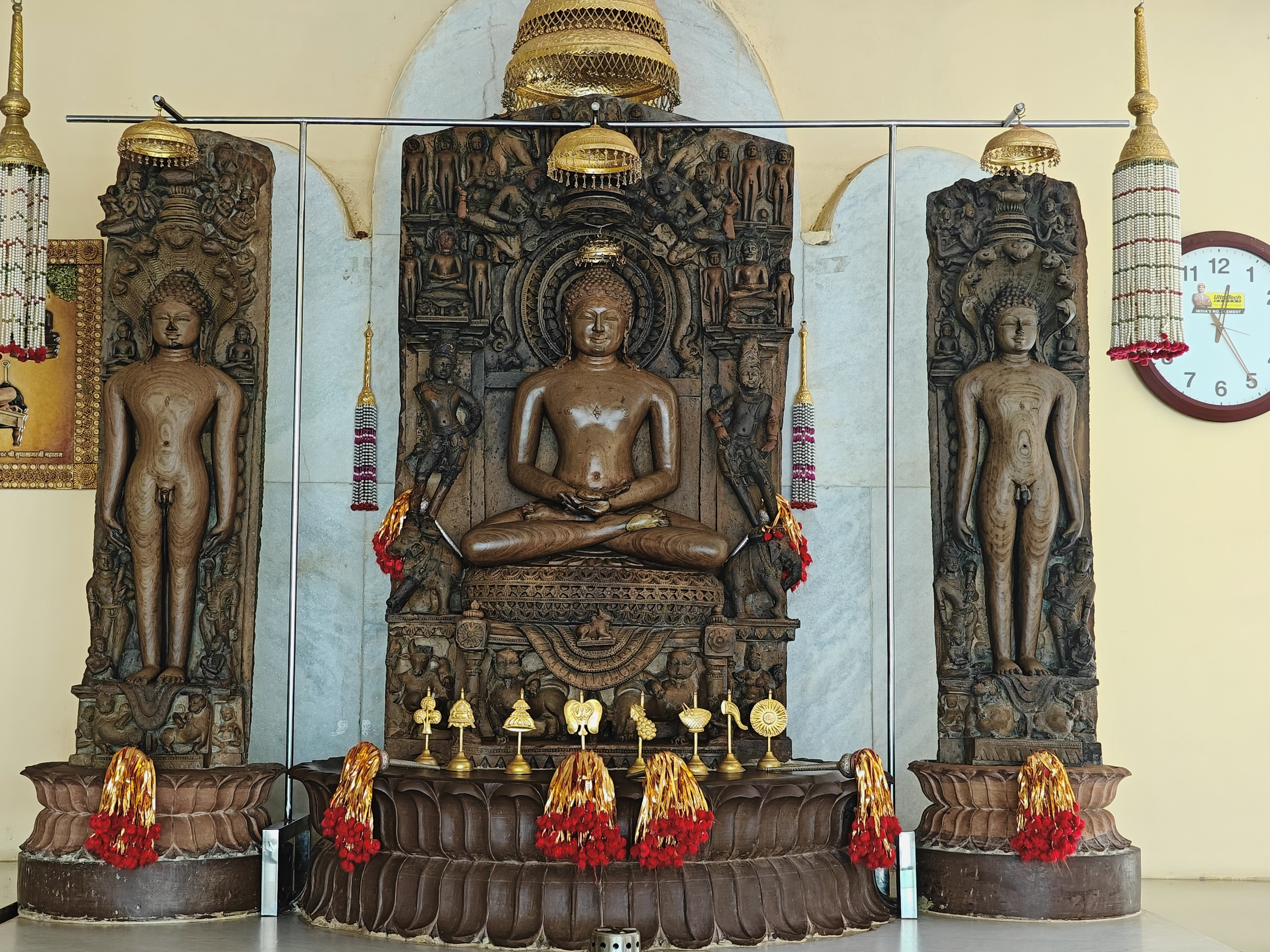
Main vedi

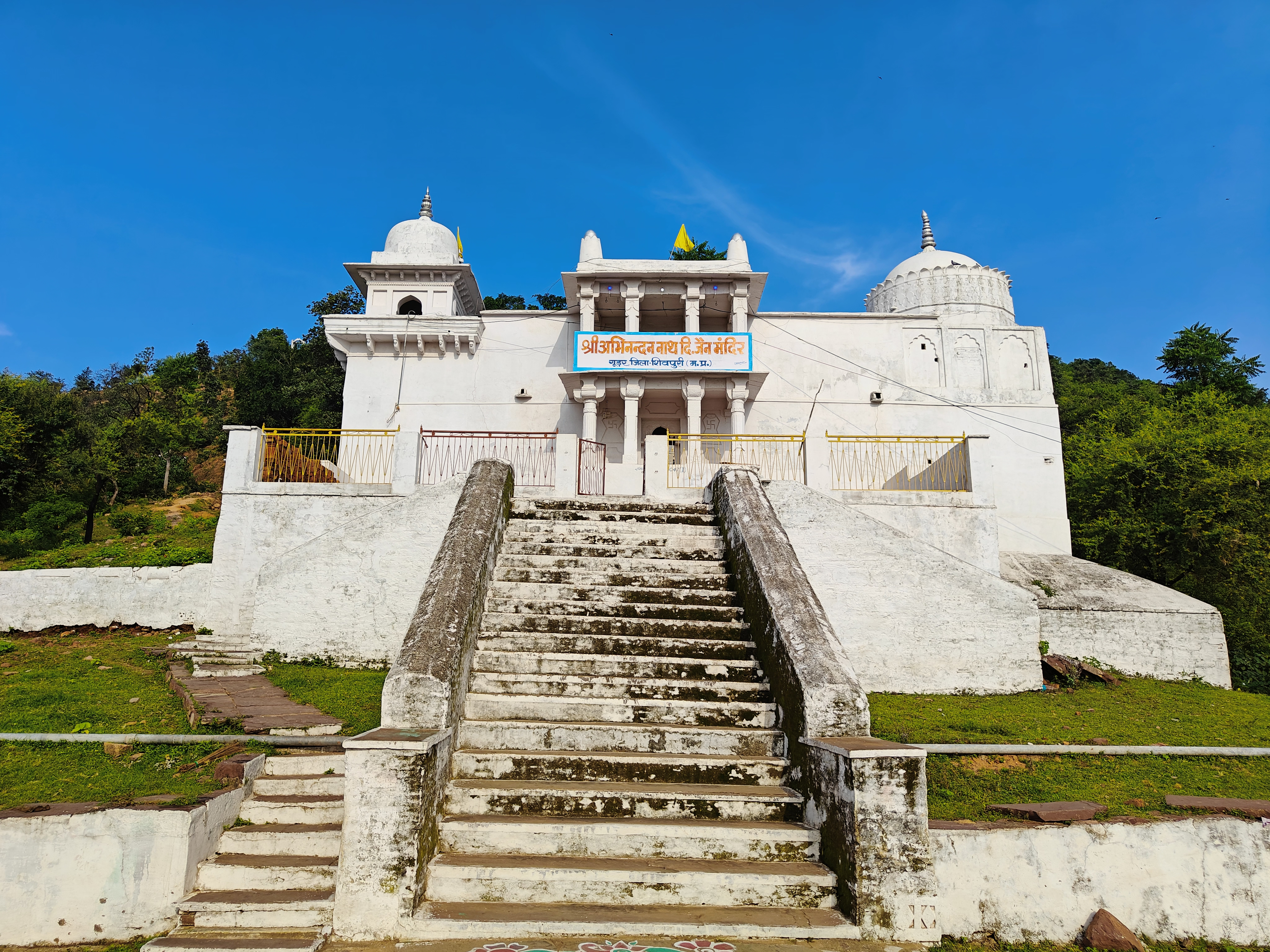
Abhinandananatha temple

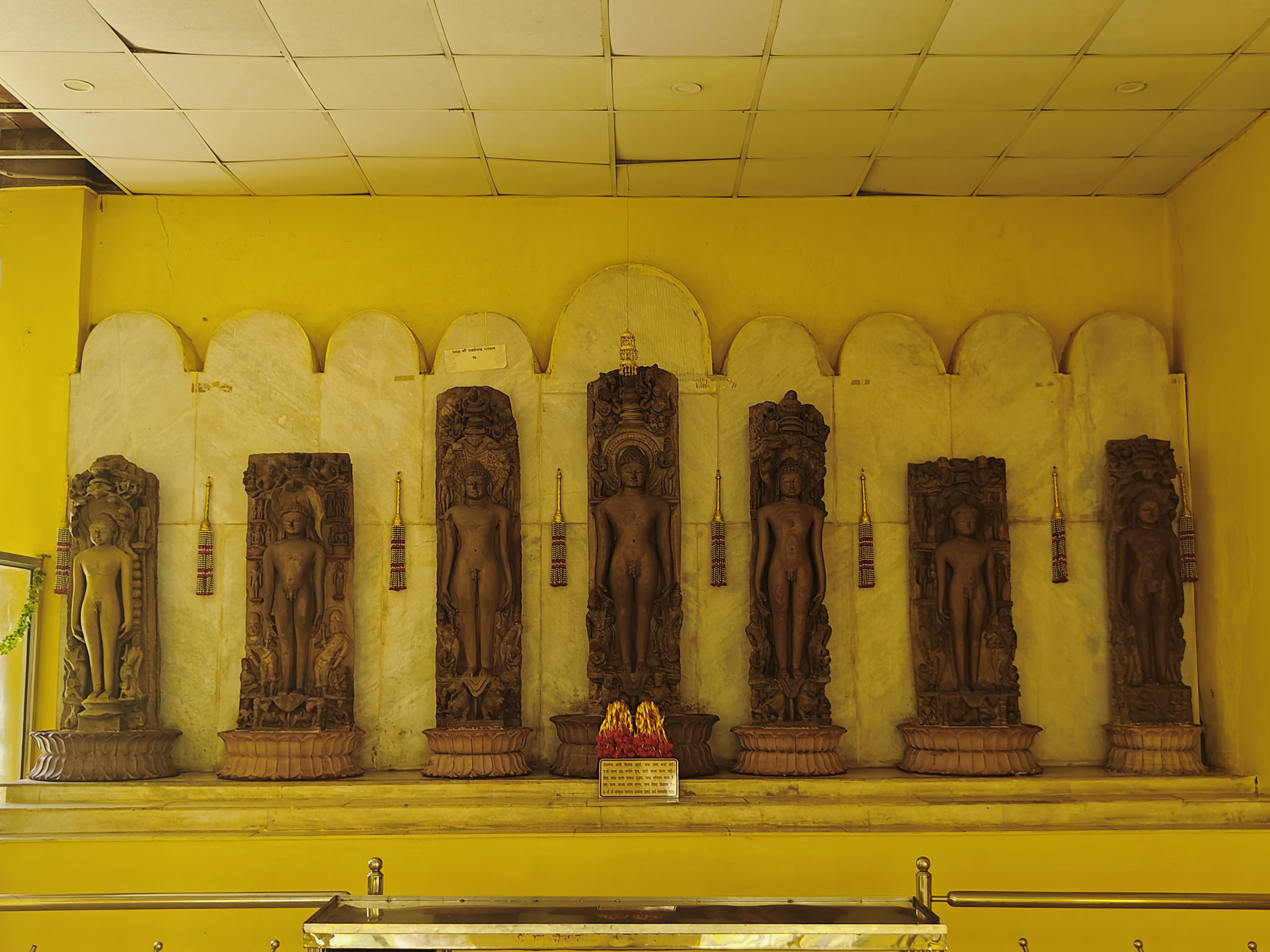
Vedi with Parshvanatha idols

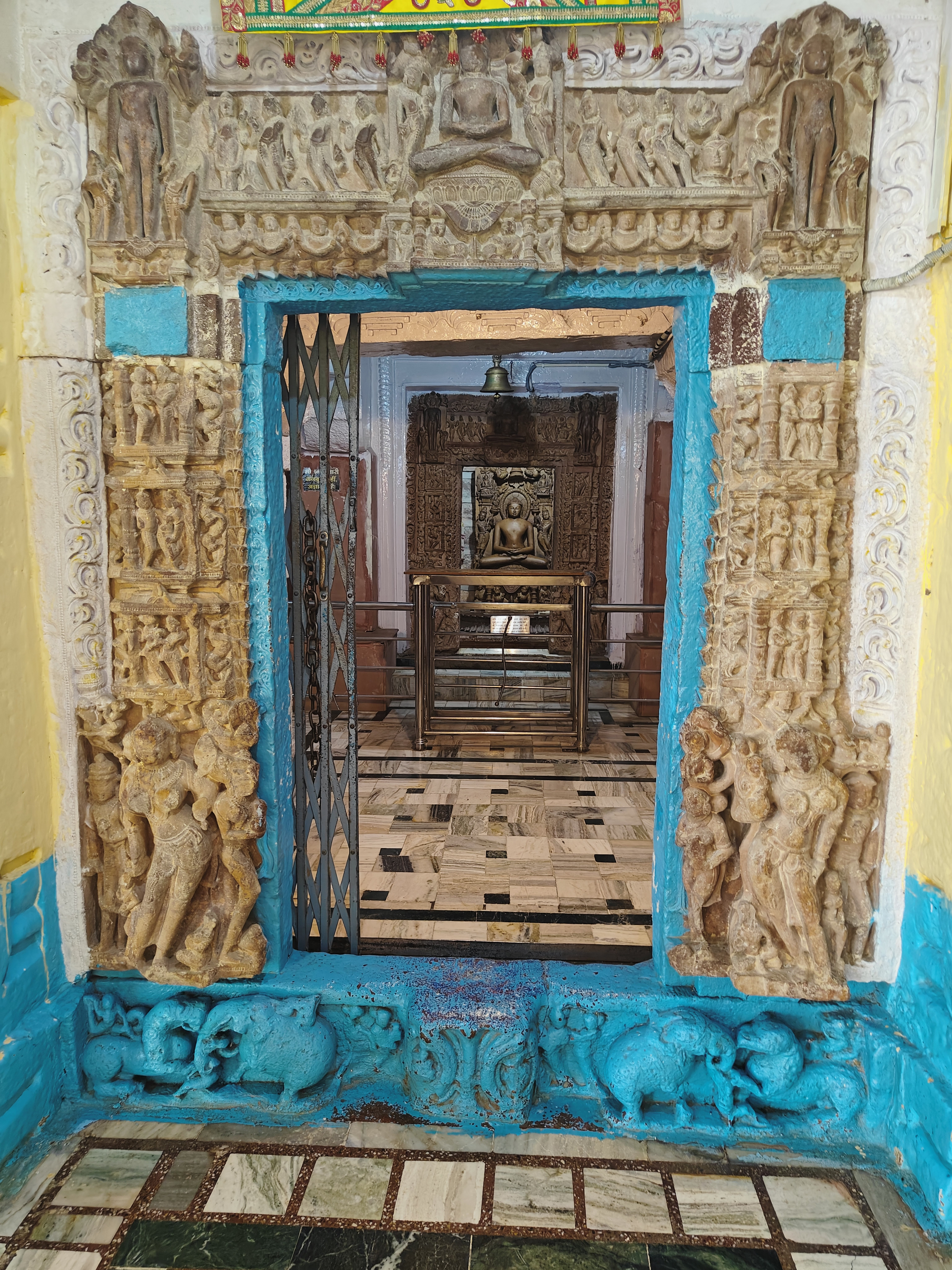
Chandraprabha idol

== Significance ==
Golakot belongs to a network of medieval Jain sites in central India whose sculptural and architectural remains have been studied in relation to the major Jain centre at Deogarh. Its significance in modern art-historical scholarship derives particularly from the stylistic relationship of its Jain images to Deogarh and from the unusual architectural arrangement of the Adinatha temple. The elongated image chamber containing seventeen large Jina representations is another notable feature of the temple.

== See also ==
- Jain temples of Deogarh
- Jain temples of Khajuraho
- Sonagiri
- Jain architecture

== Sources ==
- Bruhn, Klaus (1969). The Jina-Images of Deogarh. Leiden: E. J. Brill.
- Flügel, Peter (2021). "Jaina Non-Tīrthas in Madhyadeśa II.1: Sites of Non-Memory" (PDF). Berliner Indologische Studien. 25.
- Hegewald, Julia A. B. (2002). Water Architecture in South Asia: A Study of Types, Developments and Meanings. Brill. ISBN 978-90-04-12352-6.
- Hegewald, Julia A. B. (2008). "Domes, Tombs and Minarets: Islamic Influences on Jaina Architecture" (PDF). British Association of South Asian Studies.
- Hegewald, Julia A. B. (2015). "The International Jaina Style? Māru-Gurjara Temples Under the Solaṅkīs, throughout India and in the Diaspora". Ars Orientalis. 45: 122–144. doi:10.3998/ars.13441566.0045.005.
- Hegewald, Julia A. B. (2023). Jaina Temple Architecture in India: The Development of a Distinct Language in Space and Ritual. Heidelberg Asian Studies Publishing.
- Jain, Jyotindra; Fischer, Eberhard (1978). Jaina Art and Architecture. Vol. 2. New Delhi: Bharatiya Jnanpith.
- Shah, Umakant P. (1987). Jaina-rūpa-maṇḍana: Jaina Iconography. Abhinav Publications. ISBN 9788170172086.
- Tandon, Om Prakash (1986). Jaina Shrines in India. Publications Division, Ministry of Information and Broadcasting, Government of India.
