= Bhandasar Jain Temple =

Śvetāmbara Jain temple in Rajasthan, India

- सेठ भण्डासर जैन मंदिर
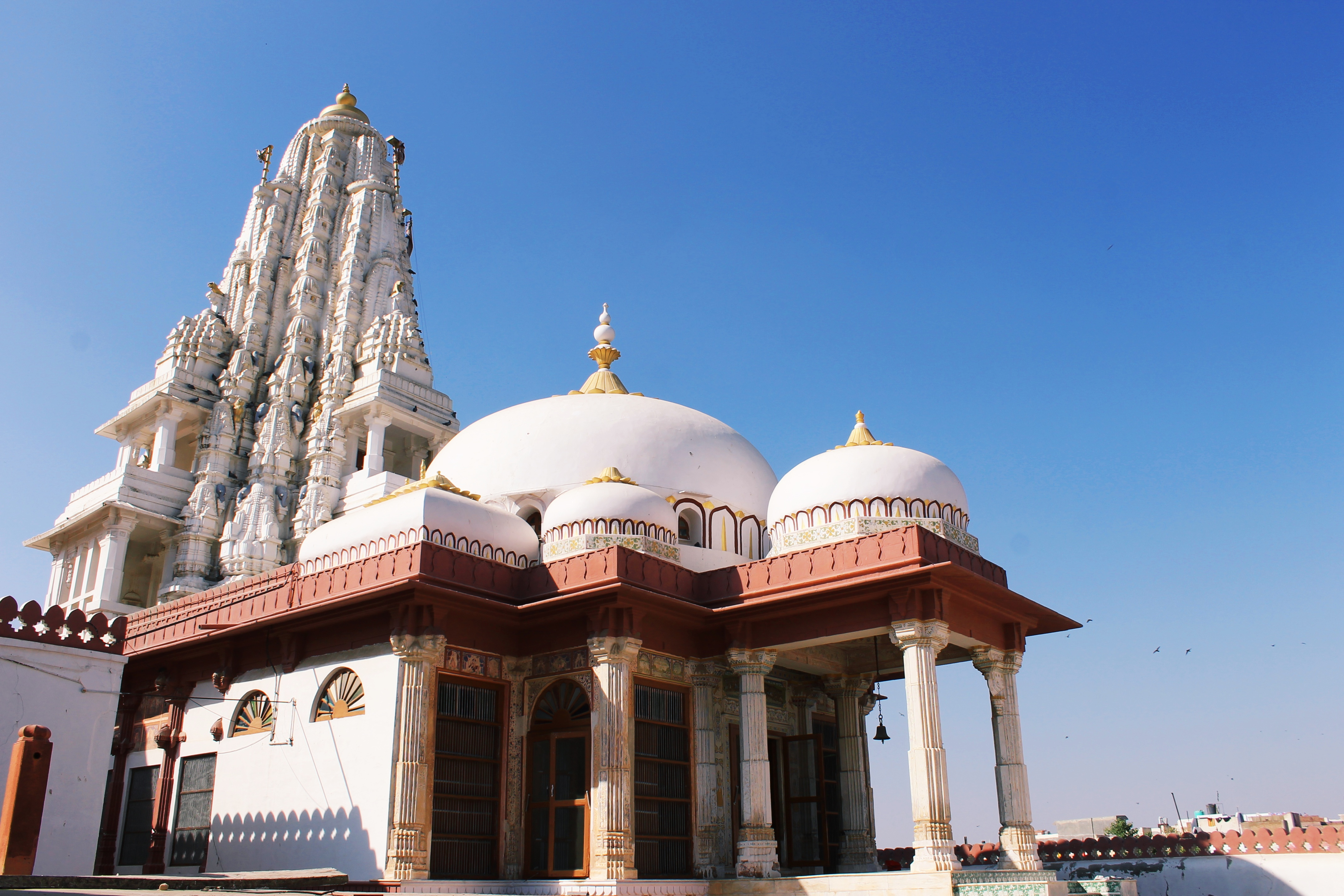
- Seth Bhandasar Jain Temple

Religion
- Affiliation: Jainism
- Sect: Śvetāmbara
- Deity: Sumatinatha
- Festival: Mahavir Jayanti

Location
- Location: Bikaner, Rajasthan, India
- Interactive map of Bhandasar Jain Temple
- Coordinates: 28°00′17.2″N 73°18′02.8″E

Architecture
- Creator: Bhanda Shah Oswal
- Established: 12th century
- Temple: 1

Bhandasar Jain Temple or Bhanda Shah Jain temple, is a Śvetāmbara Jain temple located in Bikaner, Rajasthan. The temple is famous for wall painting and art work. This temple is protected by the Archaeological Survey of India.

== History ==
The temple is associated with the Jain merchant Bhanda Shah, after whom it is known as Bhandasar. Epigraphist R. V. Somani records that Bhanda Shah, belonging to the Sankhawal gotra, constructed the Sumatinatha temple at Bikaner in Vikram Samvat 1571 (1514–15 CE). The dating of the monument is, however, not uniform in published sources. An Archaeological Survey of India inventory assigns the temple stylistically to approximately the 12th century CE, while noting that the building underwent extensive renovations in later periods. The inscriptional evidence discussed by Somani, by contrast, associates its construction by Bhanda Shah with V.S. 1571 (1514–15 CE).

According to legends, 40,000 kg of ghee instead of water was used in preparing the mortar for the construction of this temple.

== Architecture ==
Bhandasar Jain Temple is a three-storied temple, famous for its beautiful leaf paintings, frescoes and ornamented mirror work. This temple was constructed using red sandstone with beautiful paintings and yellow-stone carvings on walls, pillars of the sanctum and rangmandapa. On the walls there are illustrations depicting the lives of the 24 tirthankaras. The temple consist of garbhagriha, antarala, mahamandapa, and ardhamandapa. The sanctum is pancharatha (five rathas) is covered by shikhara having karna-amalakas and amalakas at top. The temple has undergone extensive renovation and alteration during later periods.

=== Interior decoration ===
The interior walls and pillars of the sanctuary and mandapa are extensively painted. The temple is particularly known for its wall paintings, frescoes, mirror work and gold-leaf decoration. Its painted interiors form one of the most distinctive features of the monument. The paintings and decorative work cover walls, pillars and ceilings within the temple. Rajasthan Tourism identifies intricate mirror work, murals and gold-leaf paintings among the principal artistic features of the monument.

== Dedication ==
The temple is dedicated to Sumatinatha, the fifth of the twenty-four Jain Tirthankaras. The Sumatinatha shrine forms the principal sanctuary of the temple and gives the monument its alternative identification in historical sources as the Sumatinath temple of Bikaner.

== Conservation ==
Bhandasar Jain Temple is a protected monument. It was notified for protection in 1951. The monument remains under religious use and is administered by a Jain trust. The Archaeological Survey of India's documentation notes that the monument has undergone considerable renovation during later periods.

== Conservation ==
The temple has undergone renovations and is under protection by the Archaeological Survey of India.

== Gallery ==
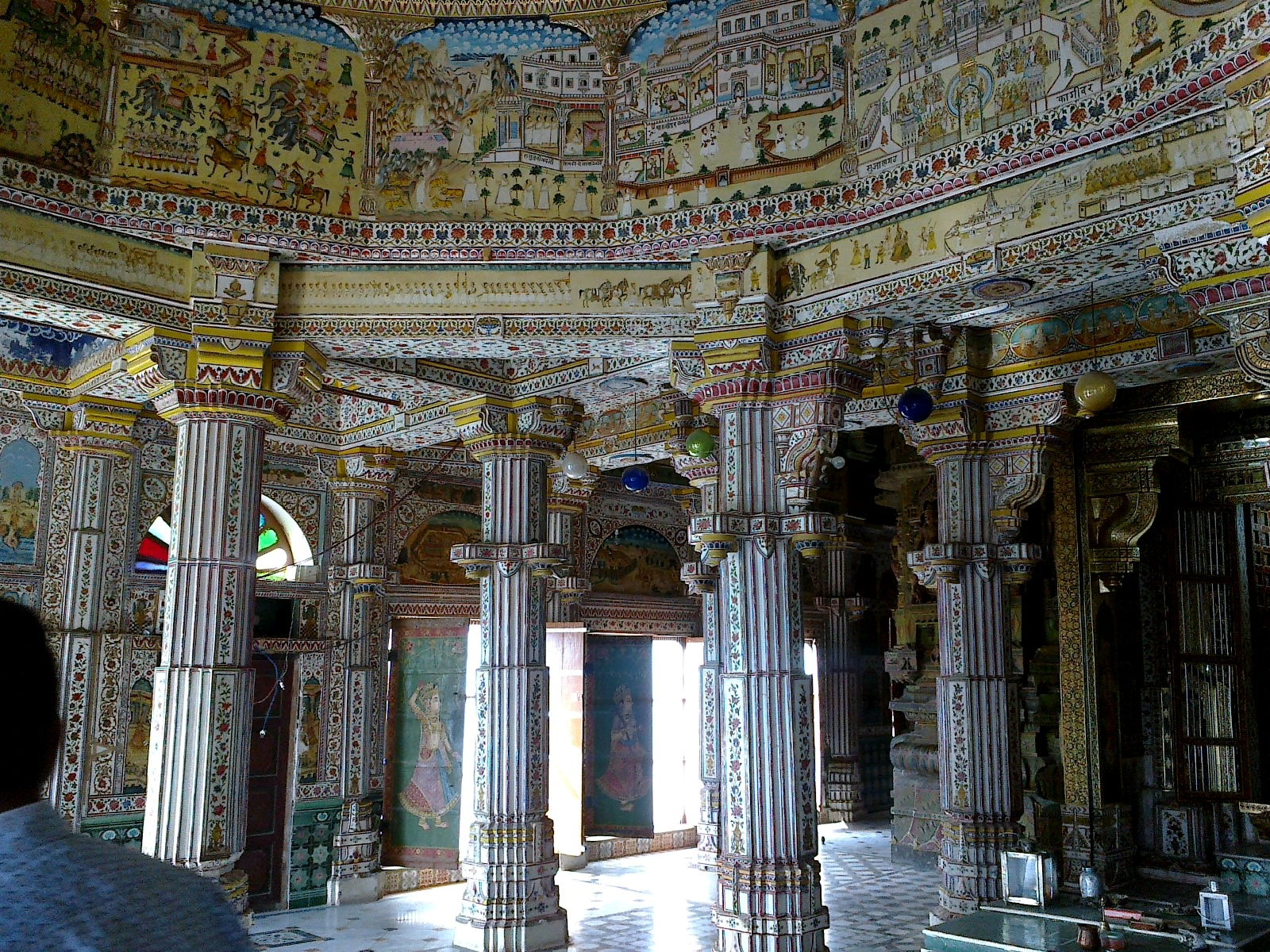
Beautiful paintings on the wall

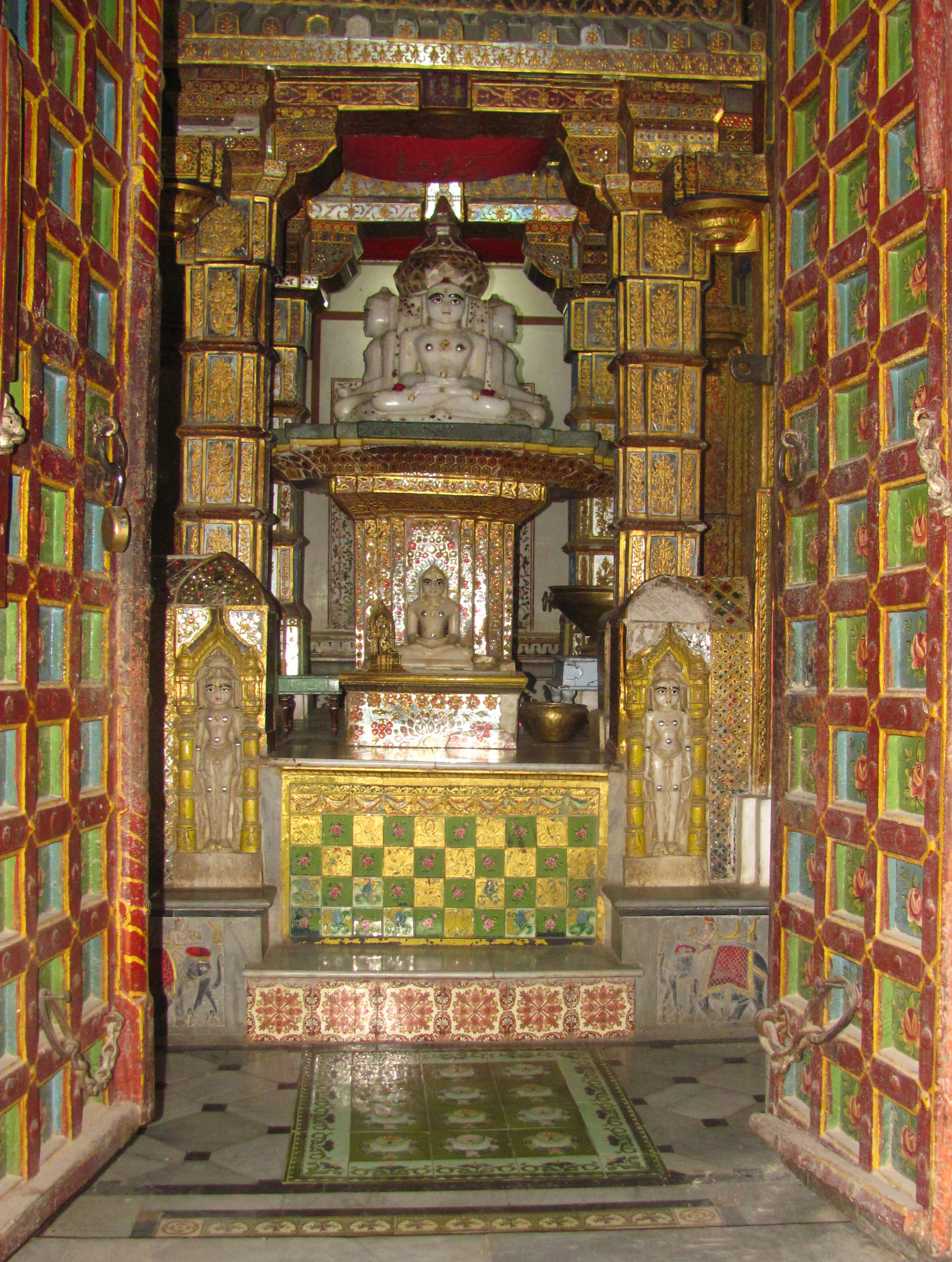
Main vedi of Bhandasar Jain Temple

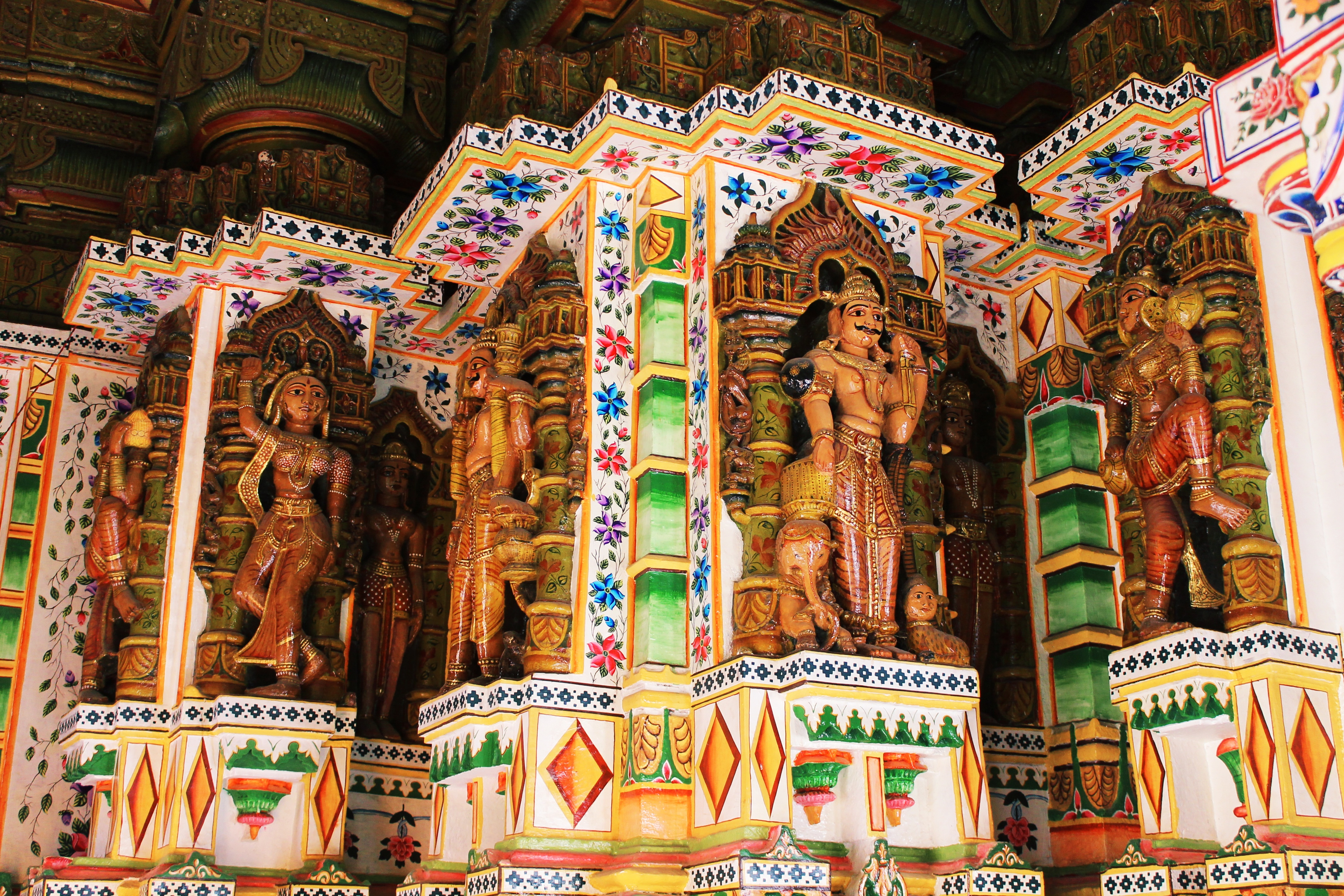
Paintings in Bhandasar Jain Temple

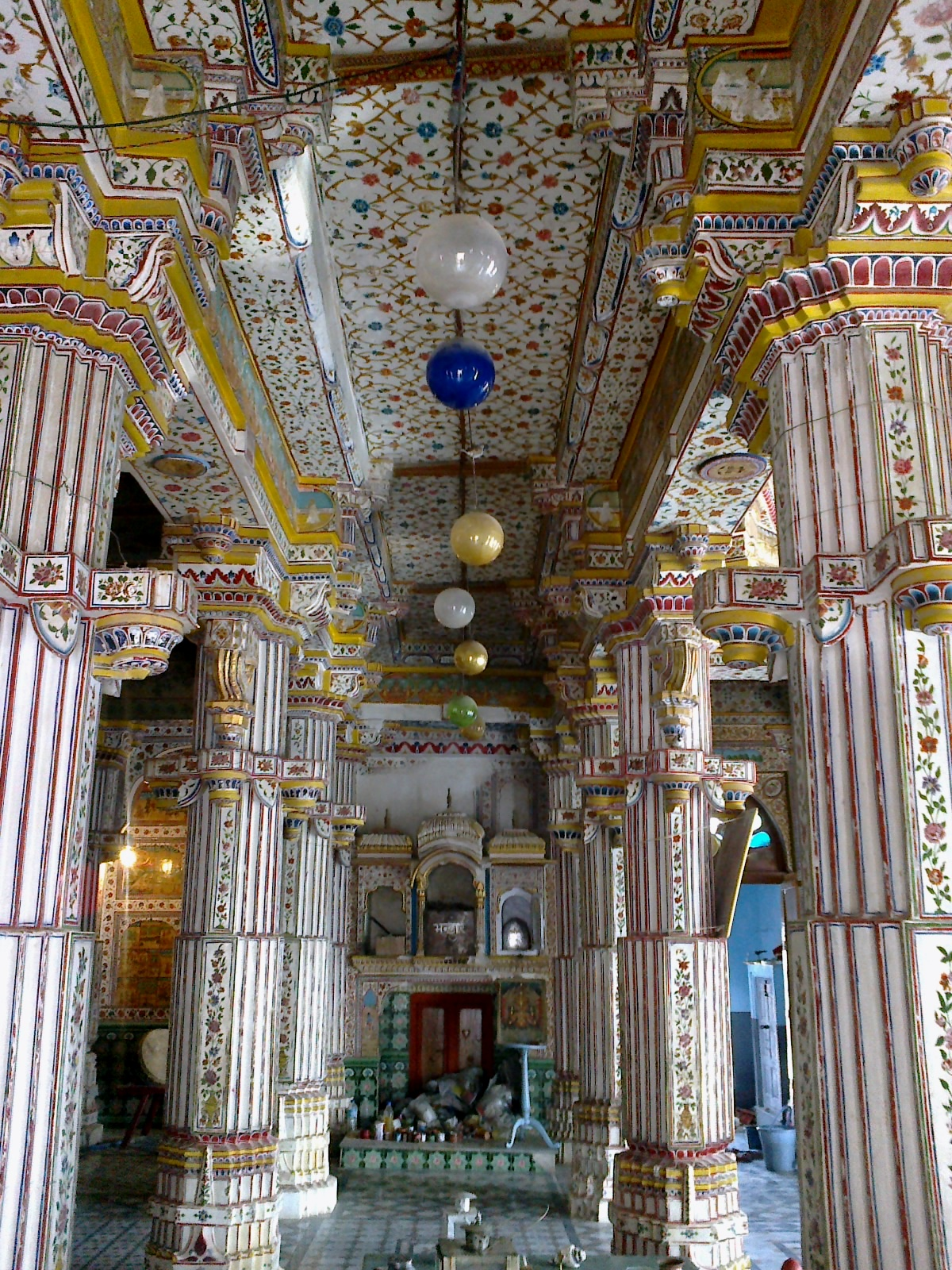
Artistic Interior

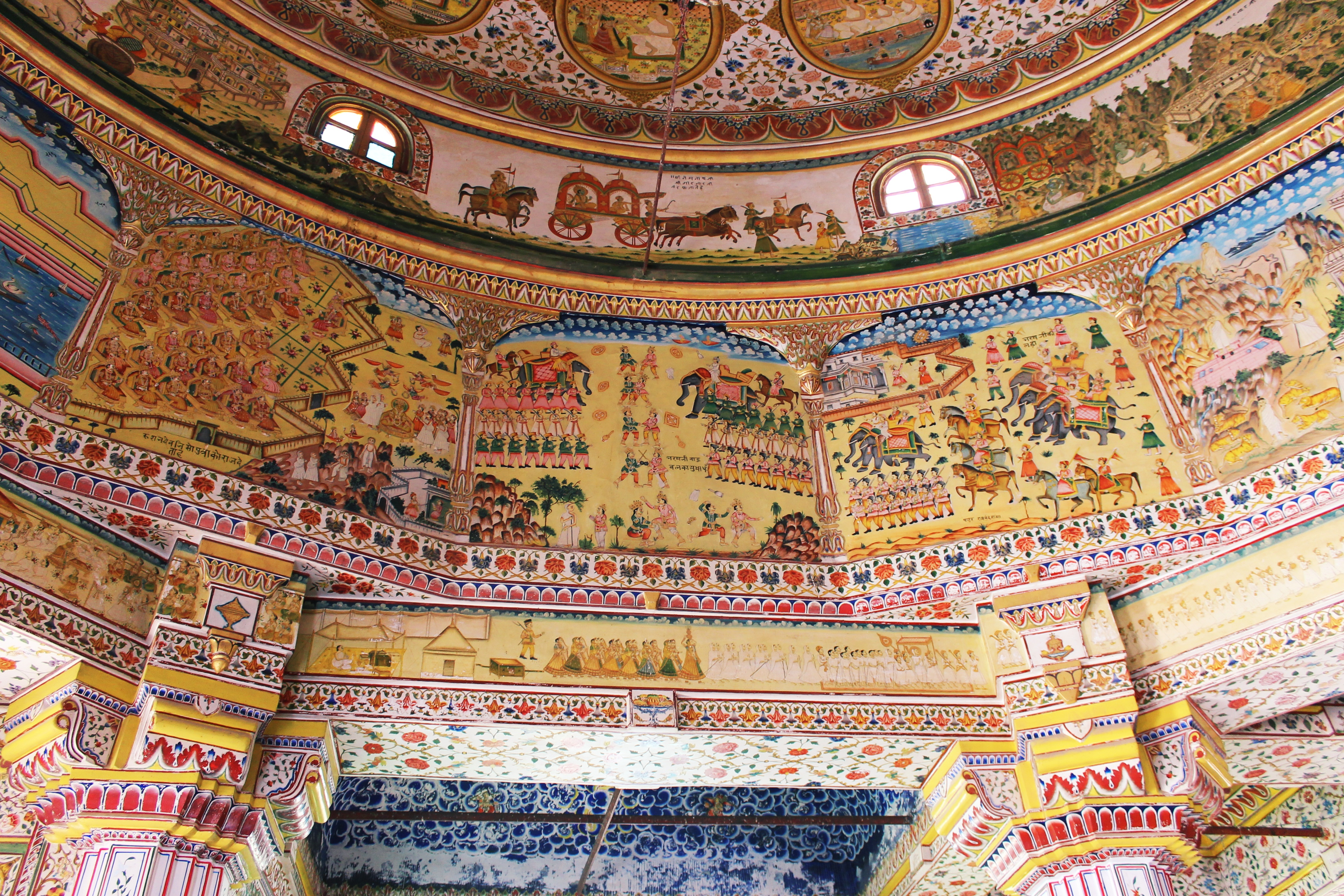
Ceiling

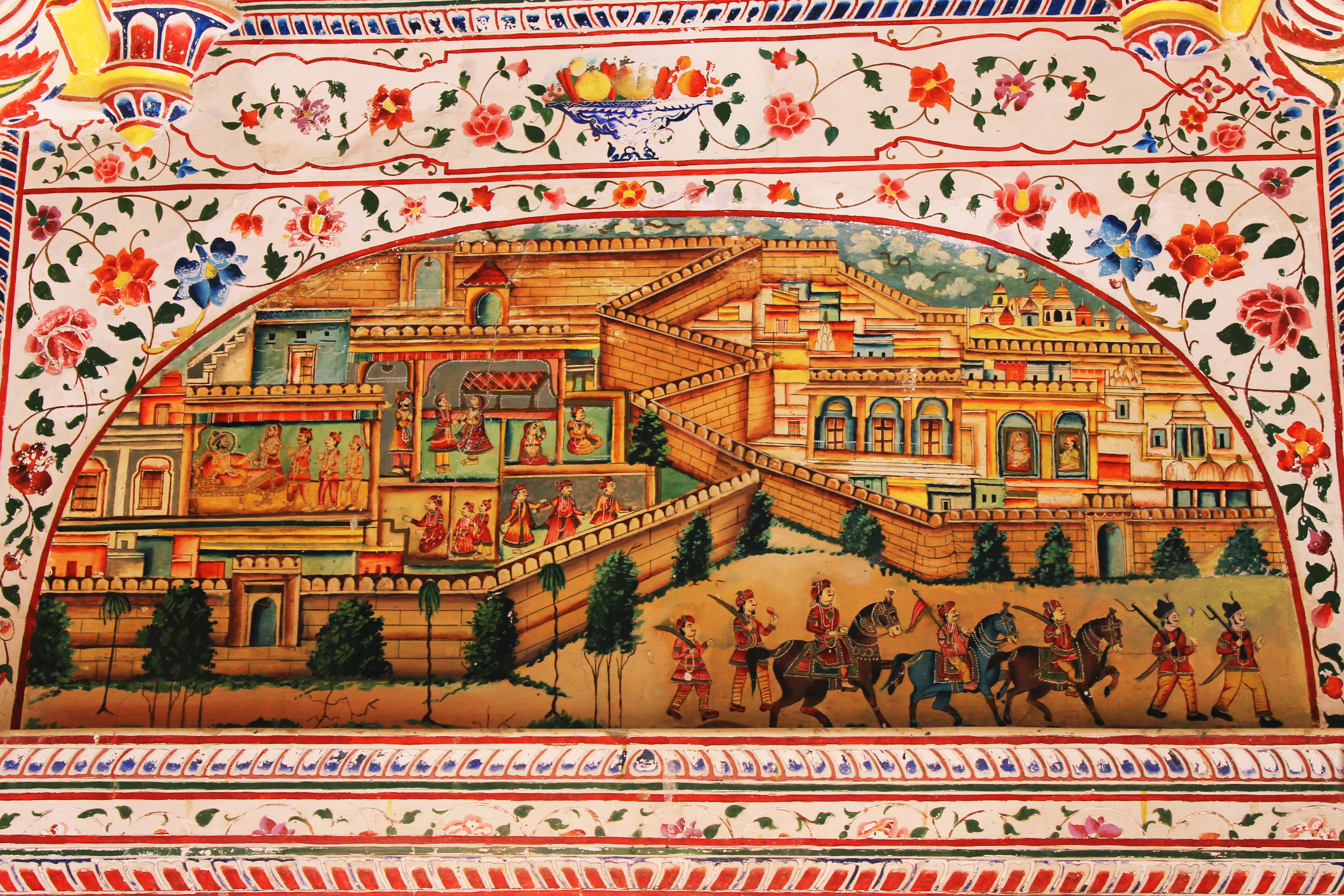
Wall Painting

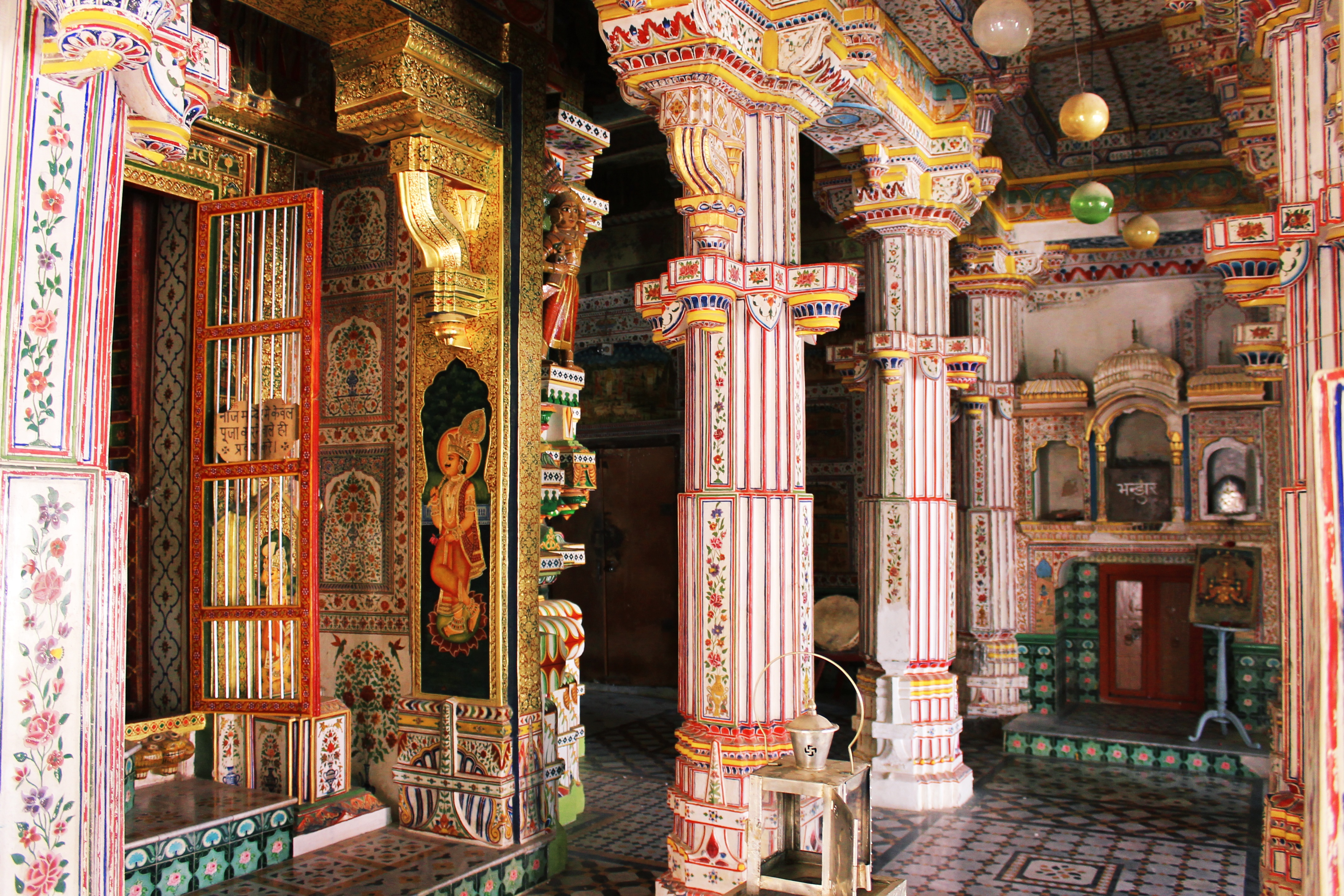
Pillar Interior

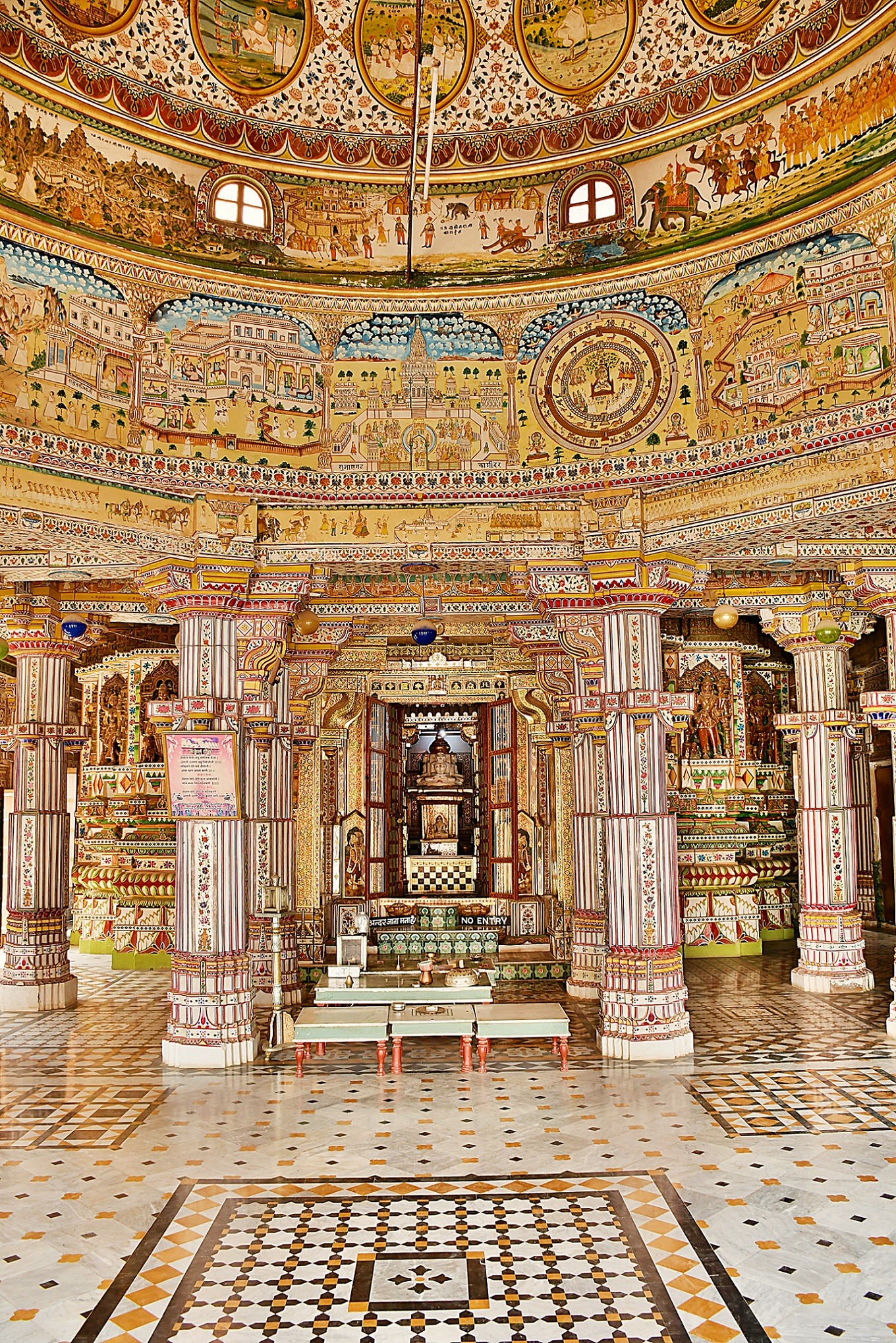
Interior

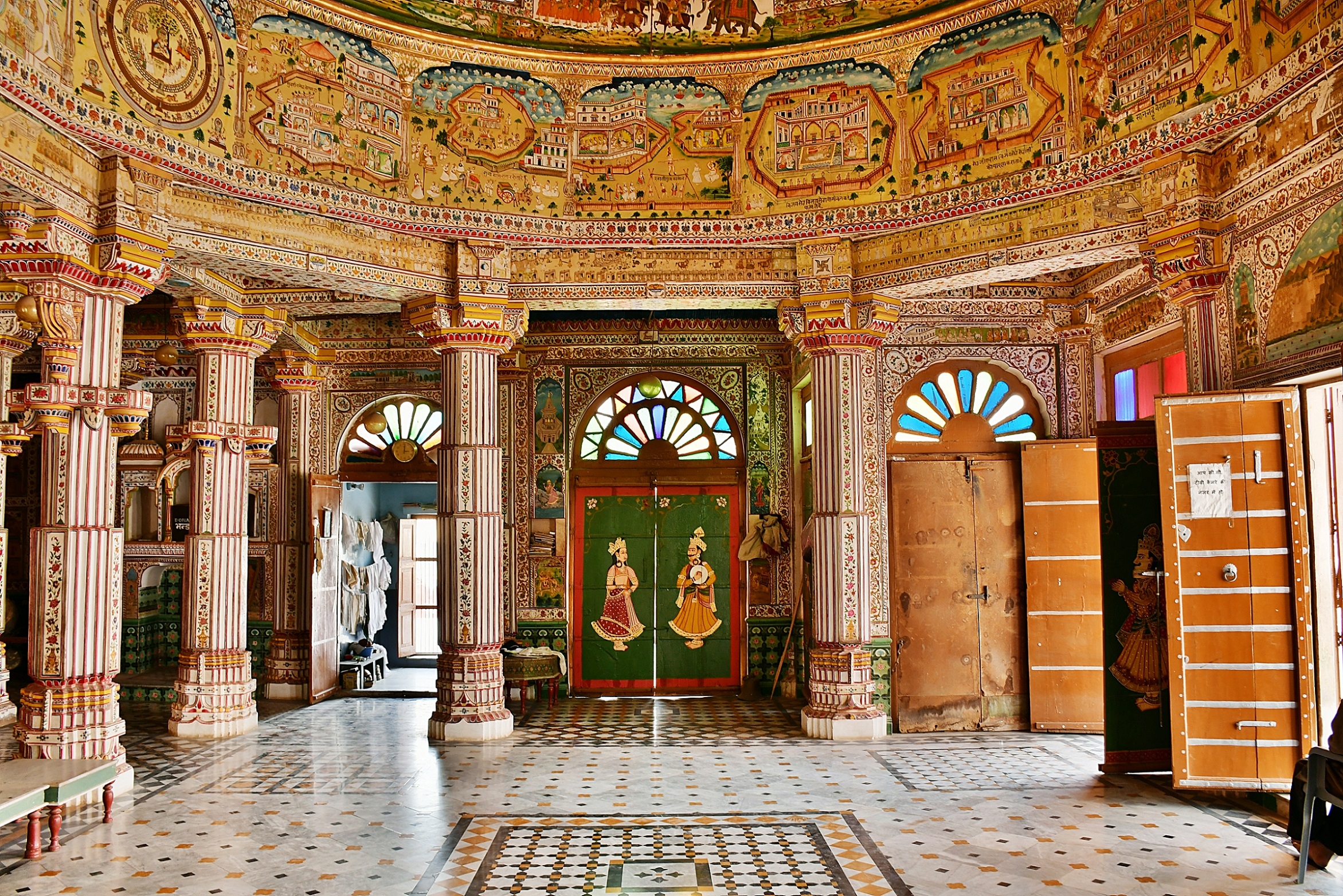
Hall

== See also ==
- Jainism in Rajasthan
- Dilwara Temples
- Ranakpur Jain temple
