= Berliner Indologische Studien =

Berliner Indologische Studien is a book series covering the early history, literatures, religions, and arts of greater South Asia. It was established in 1985 through the impetus given by Leonard van der Kuijp and Joachim K. Bautze. The present editors-in-chief are Klaus Bruhn and Gerd J.R. Mevissen. The journal publishes articles in German, French and English. It began as a publication of the Institut für Indische Philologie und Kunstgeschichte of the Free University of Berlin, but is now published by WEIDLER Buchverlag Berlin GbR.

== See also ==
- Epigraphia Carnatica
- Epigraphia Indica
- Epigraphia Zeylanica
