= Epigraphia Zeylanica =

Academic series

- Discipline: Archeology
- Language: English

Publication details
- History: 1904-present
- Publisher: Archaeological Department (Sri Lanka)
- Frequency: Irregular

Standard abbreviations
- ISO 4: Epigr. Zeylan.

Indexing
- OCLC no.: 499641639

Epigraphia Zeylanica is an irregularly published series that deals with epigraphs and other records from ancient Ceylon. Established in 1904, the series' contents range from individual articles and notes on inscriptions to single-author monographs. Over the last century, Epigraphia Zeylanica has functioned as a key source for the history of ancient Ceylon and its early epigraphic records.

== Publication history ==
Volumes 1 and 2 were edited by Don Martino de Zilva Wickremasinghe and were extensively reviewed in The Journal of the Royal Asiatic Society of Great Britain and Ireland by E. Müller.

Volume 3, covering years 1928 to 1933, was published in 1933. After Wickremasinghe's retirement as editor, the editing of this volume was passed to Senarath Paranavitana.

Volume 4, covering years 1934 to 1941, was published in 1943. It was edited by Senarath Paranavitana and Humphry William Codrington.

Volume 5 was published in three parts, with part 1 appearing in 1955 under the editorship of Paranavitana, part 2 in 1963 under the joint-editorship of Paranavitana with C. E. Godakumbura, and part 3 in the 1965 under the same editors. An auxiliary part, consisting of a preface and index, was published in 1966, again under the same two editors.

Volume 6 was published in multiple parts, with part 1 appearing in 1973 under the editorship of Senarath Paranavitana and part 2 in 1991 under the editorship of Jayania Uduwara.

Volume 7 was published in 1984, edited by Saddhamangala Karunaratne.

Volume 8 was published in 2001 as the single author monograph The growth of Buddhist monastic institutions in Sri Lanka from Brāhmī inscriptions, by Mālinī Ḍayas.

== See also ==
- Epigraphia Carnatica
- Epigraphia Indica
