= Senarath Paranavithana =

Sri Lankan archeologist and epigraphist (1896–1972)

Senarath Paranavitana
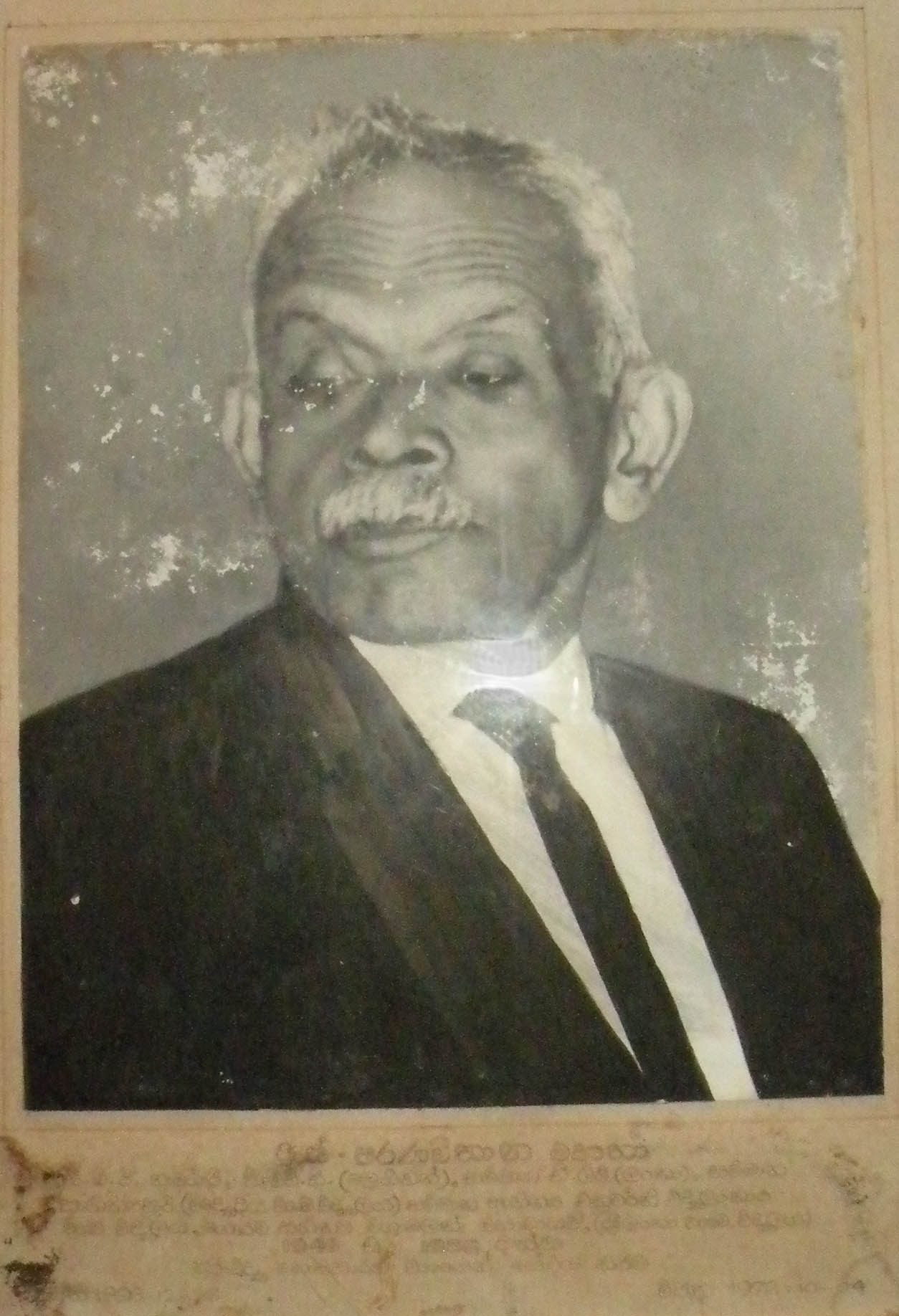
- Born: 26 December 1896; Galle, Galle, British Ceylon
- Died: 4 October 1972 (aged 75)
- Education: Metaramba Government School, Buona Vista College, Leiden University
- Occupations: Archeologist and an Epigraphist
- Spouse: Roslyn Kitulgoda

Senarath Paranavitana, CBE (Sinhala:සෙනරත් පරණවිතාන) (26 December 1896 – 4 October 1972) was a Sri Lankan archeologist and epigraphist, who pioneered much of post-colonial archaeology in Sri Lanka. He served as the Commissioner of Archeology from 1940 to 1956 and there after as Professor of Archeology at the University of Ceylon from 1957 to 1961.

== Early life ==
Paranavitana was born on 26 December 1896 at Metaramba, Galle, and had his early education at the Metaramba Government School. He later entered Buona Vista College in Galle. He studied Oriental languages at Ranweligoda Pirivena in Heenatigala and became a school teacher at the Udugampola Government School.

== Archaeology ==
He joined the Archaeological Survey of Ceylon in May 1923. Undergoing training in archaeology, Paranavithana specialized in Epigraphy. He was sent to India to train with the Archaeological Survey of India. In 1936, he received his Ph.D. from the University of Leiden. He was Archaeological Commissioner on 1 October 1940 in which capacity he served diligently till December, 1956. The next year, in 1957, he was appointed Professor of Archeology at the Peradeniya campus of the University of Ceylon.

Even though Paranavitana's period began with the onset of the Second World War, his erudition and energy resulted in seventeen fruitful years as the Archaeological Commissioner of Ceylon. Sri Lankan history and prehistory were illuminated by his academic and popular writings which are filled with insight, profound learning and a vital sense of history. Known for his contributions to and editing of Epigraphia Zeylanica, his most celebrated magnum opus was Sigiri Graffiti, published in two folio volumes by Oxford University Press.

Some of the epigraphical texts published after Paranavitana's retirement present a number of problems for historians. In 1996, for example, Ananda W. P. Guruge subjected his later work to detailed scrutiny in his paper "Senarat Paranavitana as a Writer of Historical Fiction in Sanskrit." The problem was reviewed comprehensively a short time later by D. P. M. Weerakkody. The general consensus that has emerged subsequent to these publications is that all of Paranavitana's later readings need to be double-checked before being treated as sound epigraphic and historical evidence.

Paranavitana made numerous contributions to foreign and local journals in the fields of epigraphy, history, art, architecture, religion, languages and literature, most notably the University of Ceylon Review.

== Honors ==
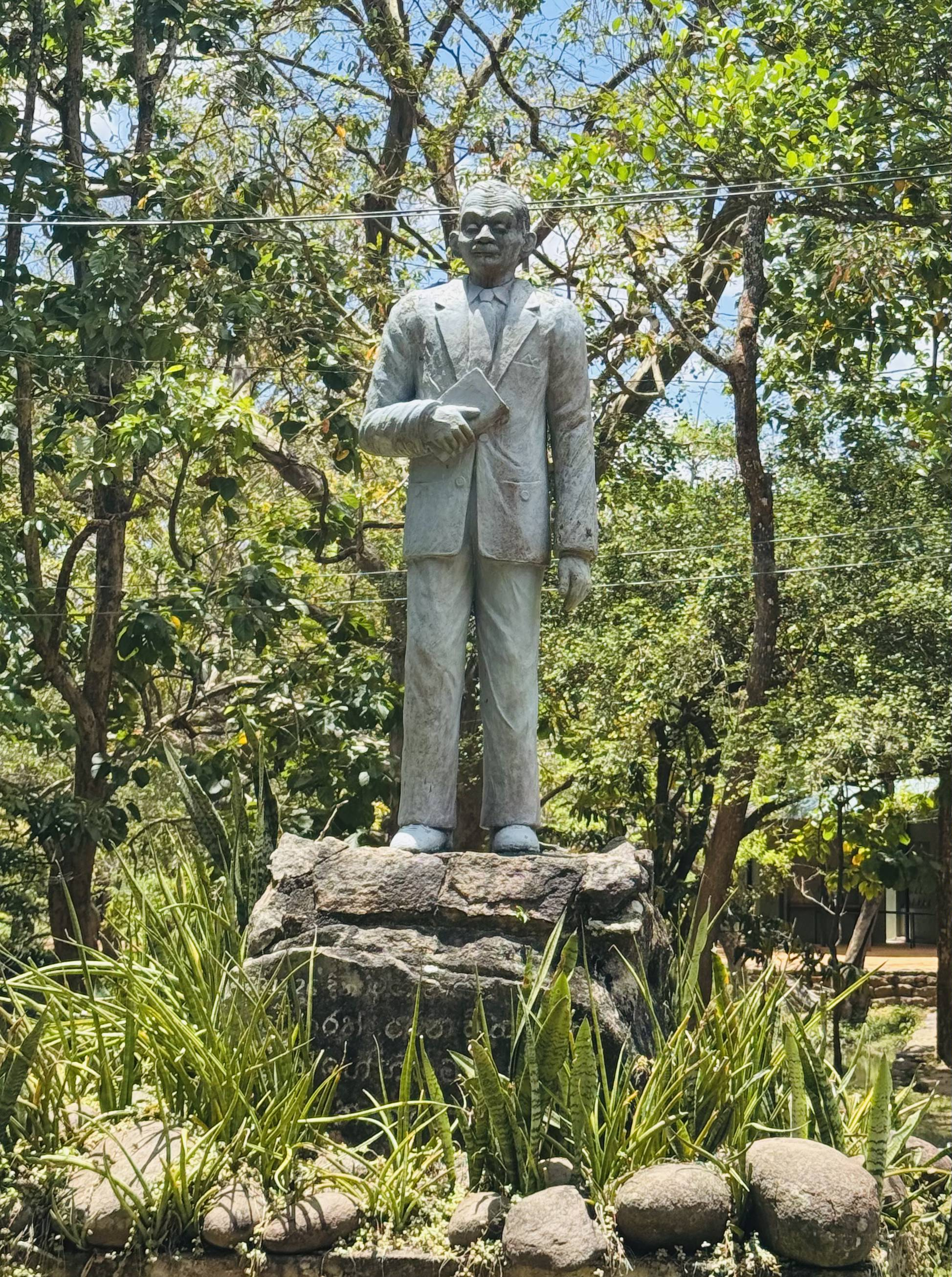
Paranavitha Statue at Sigirya

Paranavithana was appointed an Officer of the Most excellent Order of the British Empire (OBE) in the 1950 New Year Honours and a Commander of the Most Excellent Order of the British Empire (CBE) in the 1952 New Year Honours for his services as Archeological Commissioner by the Government of Ceylon. He was awarded a D.Litt. (Honoris Causa) by the University of Ceylon in 1952, the Gold Medal of the Ceylon Branch of the Royal Asiatic Society in 1955, Sahitya Suri (D. Litt. Honoris Causa) from the Vidyodaya University of Ceylon in 1960 and Sahitya Chakravarti (D. Litt. Honoris Causa) from the Vidyalankara University of Ceylon in 1962.

== Personal life ==
He married Roslyn Kitulgoda in 1930.

== Bibliography ==
- The Shrine of Upulvan at Devundara (1953)
- The God of Adam's Peak (1958)
- Ceylon and Malaysia (1961)
- Inscriptions of Ceylon Vol. I (1970)
- The Greeks and the Mauryas (1971)
- Arts of Ancient Sinhalese (1971)
- Inscriptions of Ceylon Vol. II (published posthumously)
- Story of Sigiriya (published posthumously)
- Sinhalayo

== External links in Sinhala ==
- Article about Dr.Senarath Paranavitana in Sinhala
- Article about Dr.Senarath Paranavitana in Sinhala - National Heritage
- පරණ නොවන පරණවිතාන මෙහෙවර
- Sigiriya Art By Dr.Senarath Paranavitana in Sinhala
- මහාචාර්ය සෙනරත් පරණවිතාන දිවිමග සලකුණු(1896 - 1972)
