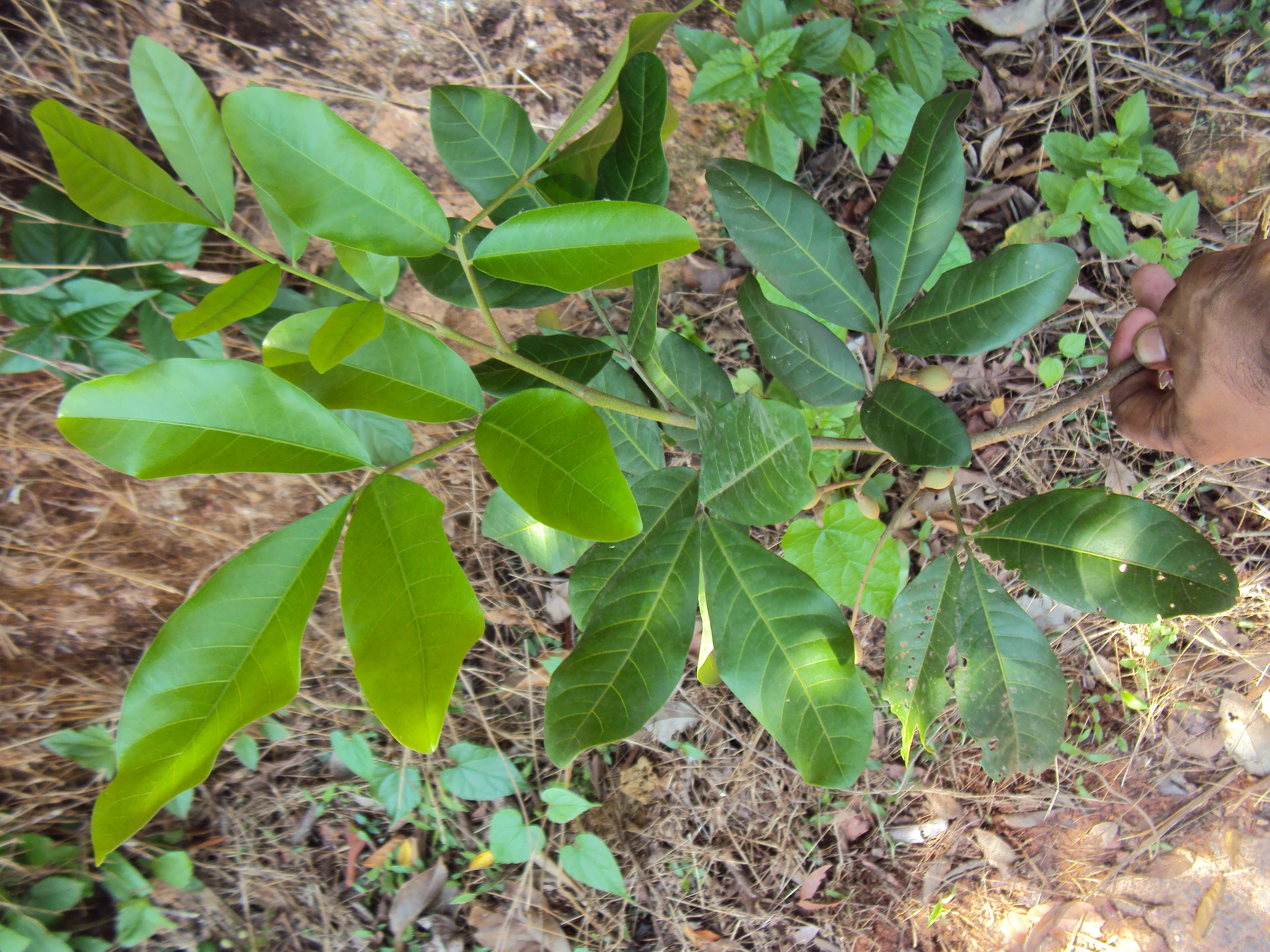

Conservation status
- Least Concern (IUCN 2.3)

Scientific classification
- Kingdom: Plantae
- Clade: Tracheophytes
- Clade: Angiosperms
- Clade: Eudicots
- Clade: Rosids
- Order: Sapindales
- Family: Meliaceae
- Genus: Aglaia
- Species: A. elaeagnoidea

Binomial name
- Aglaia elaeagnoidea (A.Juss.) Benth.

Synonyms
- Aglaia abbreviata C.Y.Wu; Aglaia canariifolia Koord.; Aglaia cupreolepidota Merr.; Aglaia elaeagnoidea var. beddomei (Gamble) N.C.Nair; Aglaia elaeagnoidea var. bourdillonii (Gamble) N.C.Nair; Aglaia elaeagnoidea var. courtallensis (Gamble) N.C.Nair; Aglaia elaeagnoidea var. formosana Hayata; Aglaia elaeagnoidea var. pallens Merr.; Aglaia formosana (Hayata) Hayata; Aglaia grata Wall. ex Voigt; Aglaia hoanensis Pierre; Aglaia lepidota Miq.; Aglaia littoralis Talbot [Illegitimate] ); Aglaia midnaporensis Carey ex Voigt; Aglaia odoratissima Benth. [Illegitimate]; Aglaia pallens (Merr.) Merr.; Aglaia parvifolia Merr.; Aglaia poilanei Pellegr.; Aglaia poulocondorensis Pellegr.; Aglaia roxburghiana (Wight & Arn.) Miq.; Aglaia roxburghiana var. beddomei Gamble; Aglaia roxburghiana var. courtallensis Gamble; Aglaia spanoghei Blume ex Miq.; Aglaia talbotii Sundararagh.; Aglaia wallichii Hiern; Amoora poulocondorensis (Pellegr.) Harms; Milnea roxburghiana Wight & Arn.; Nemedra elaeagnoidea A. Juss. Sy; Sapindus lepidotus Wall.; Walsura lanceolata Wall.

= Aglaia elaeagnoidea =

Species of tree

Aglaia elaeagnoidea, the droopy leaf or priyangu, is a species of plant in the family Meliaceae. It is a 10m tall tree found in American Samoa, Australia (Western Australia and Queensland), Cambodia, China, India, Indonesia, Malaysia, New Caledonia, Papua New Guinea, the Philippines, Samoa, Sri Lanka, Taiwan (Hengchun Peninsula), Thailand, Vanuatu, and Vietnam.

== Description ==
Timber is bright red color is a hard wood. Bark is greyish brown in color. White latex can be exudate. Leaves are compound, imparipinnate, alternate; lamina narrow-elliptic to oblanceolate; apex bluntly acute to subacuminate; base acute to cuneate. Flowers show axillary panicles inflorescence. Fruit is a brown or red, indehiscent globose berry.

== Common names ==
- English — droopy leaf, priyangu, coastal boodyarra
- Hindi — priyangu (प्रियंगू)
- Tamil — chokkala, chokla
- Malayalam — nyalei, punniyava, cheeralam
- Telugu — yerra adugu, erranduga, kondanduga
- Kannada — gadagayya, kempu nola, thottilu, priyangu
- Mandarin — shanluo, hong chai (red wood)
- Sinhala — puwanga

== Uses ==
The wood is hard and is a good material for construction. The aborigines often used it to build houses in Taiwan. It can also be used to make various utensils.)
