= Parshvanatha basadi, Shravanabelgola =

Jain temple in Shravanabelgola complex in the state of Karnataka

- ಪಾರ್ಶ್ವನಾಥ ಬಸದಿ
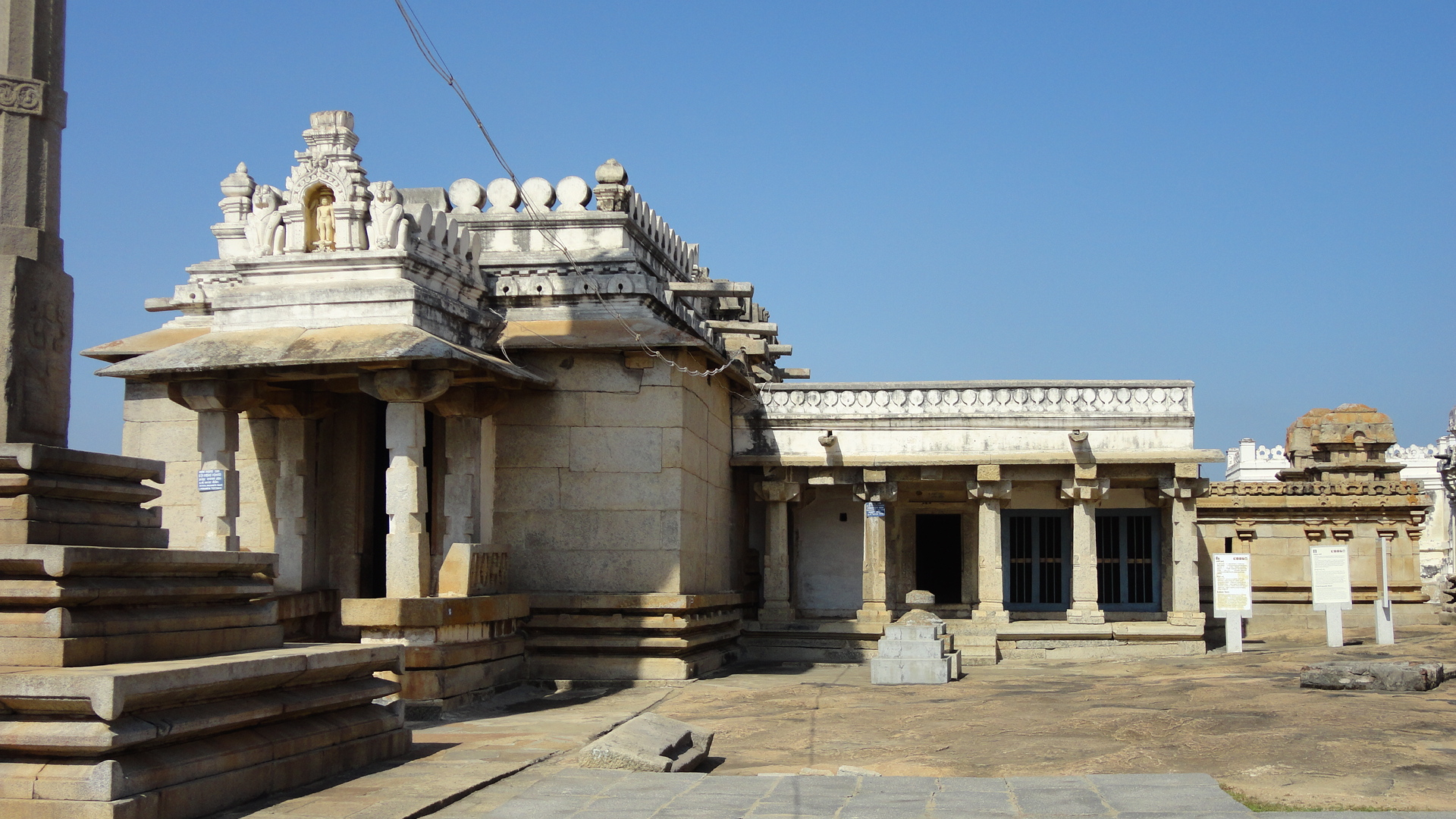
- Parshvanatha Basadi

Religion
- Affiliation: Jainism
- Deity: Parshvanatha
- Festival: Mahavir Jayanti

Location
- Location: Shravana Belgola, Hassan, Karnataka
- Interactive map of Parshvanatha basadi, Shravanabelgola
- Coordinates: 12°51′18″N 76°29′06″E

Architecture
- Style: Dravidian architecture
- Established: 11th—12th century

Parshvanatha Basadi or Kamatha Parshvanatha Basadi is a Jain temple (basadi) located on Chandragiri Hill in Shravanabelagola, a town in Karnataka, India.

== History ==
The Parshvanatha Basadi was built in the 11th–12th century CE according to an inscription found on a temple pillar. The manastambha pillar in front of the temple was erected by Puttayya during the reign of Chikka Devaraja (1645–1704 CE) of the Mysore Kingdom.

== The temple ==
The loft temple plan consists of a garbhagraha (inner sanctum), a shallow sukanasa (entrance ornament), a large pillared mandapa (pavilion), and a cornered porch. The temple stands on a high plinth of five moldings. The temple's mulnayak, the idol of Parshva, is an 18 feet (5.5 m) monolithic idol standing over a lotus pedestal in the kayotsarga posture and a hood of seven-headed serpents overhead. The idol has been noted as a fine example of craftsmanship with detailed carving of the hood and a sculptured lotus pedestal. The manastambha is a 65.5 feet (20.0 m) tall pillar. The pillar has a square base and is adorned with Jain images. The top of the pillar depicts a chaturmukha (four-faced) idol of Padmavati, four-armed Yaksha, Kushmandini and Brahma riding on a horse. Parshvanatha basadi is considered the most important in the Jain temple complex of Chandragiri Hill for its architecture.

This temple is one of the Archaeological Survey of India's Adarsh Smarak Monument along with other temples in the Shravanabelagola group of monuments.

== Photo gallery ==
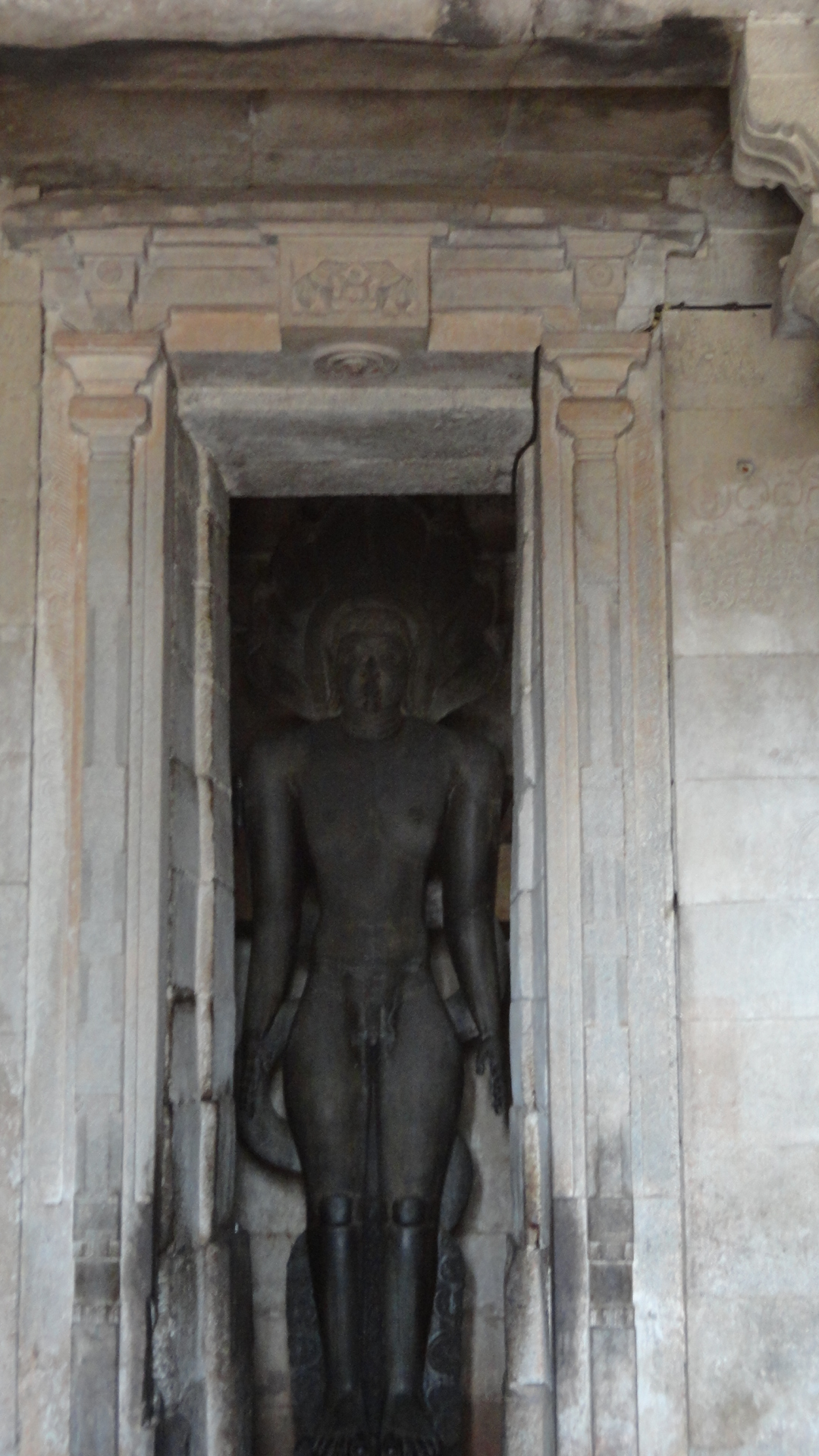
18 feet (5.5 m) Parshvanatha statue

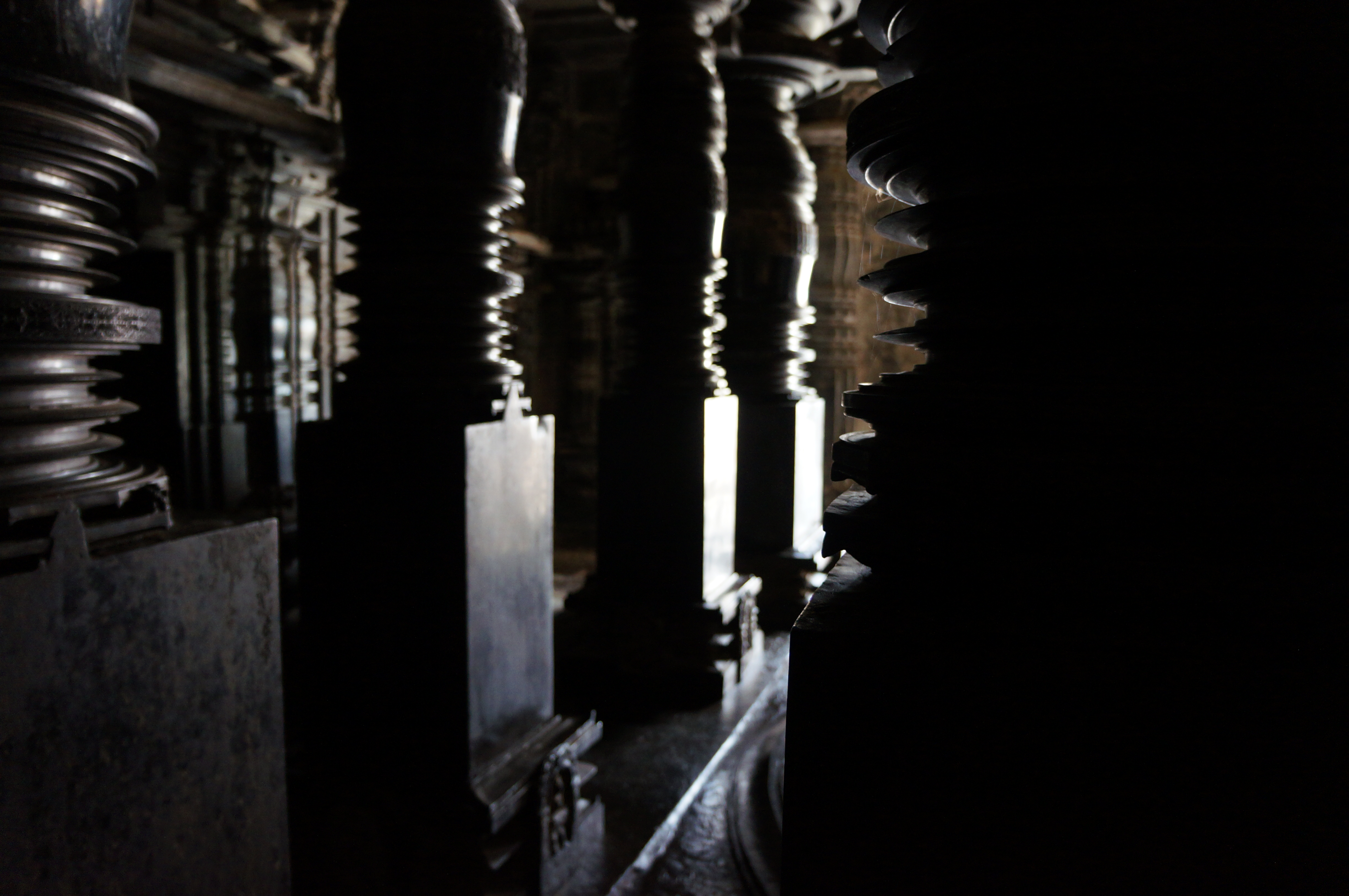
Lathe-turned pillar

== See also ==
- Akkana Basadi
- Gommateshwara statue
- Chandragupta basadi
- Chavundaraya Basadi
