= Chavundaraya =

Indian Jain ruler

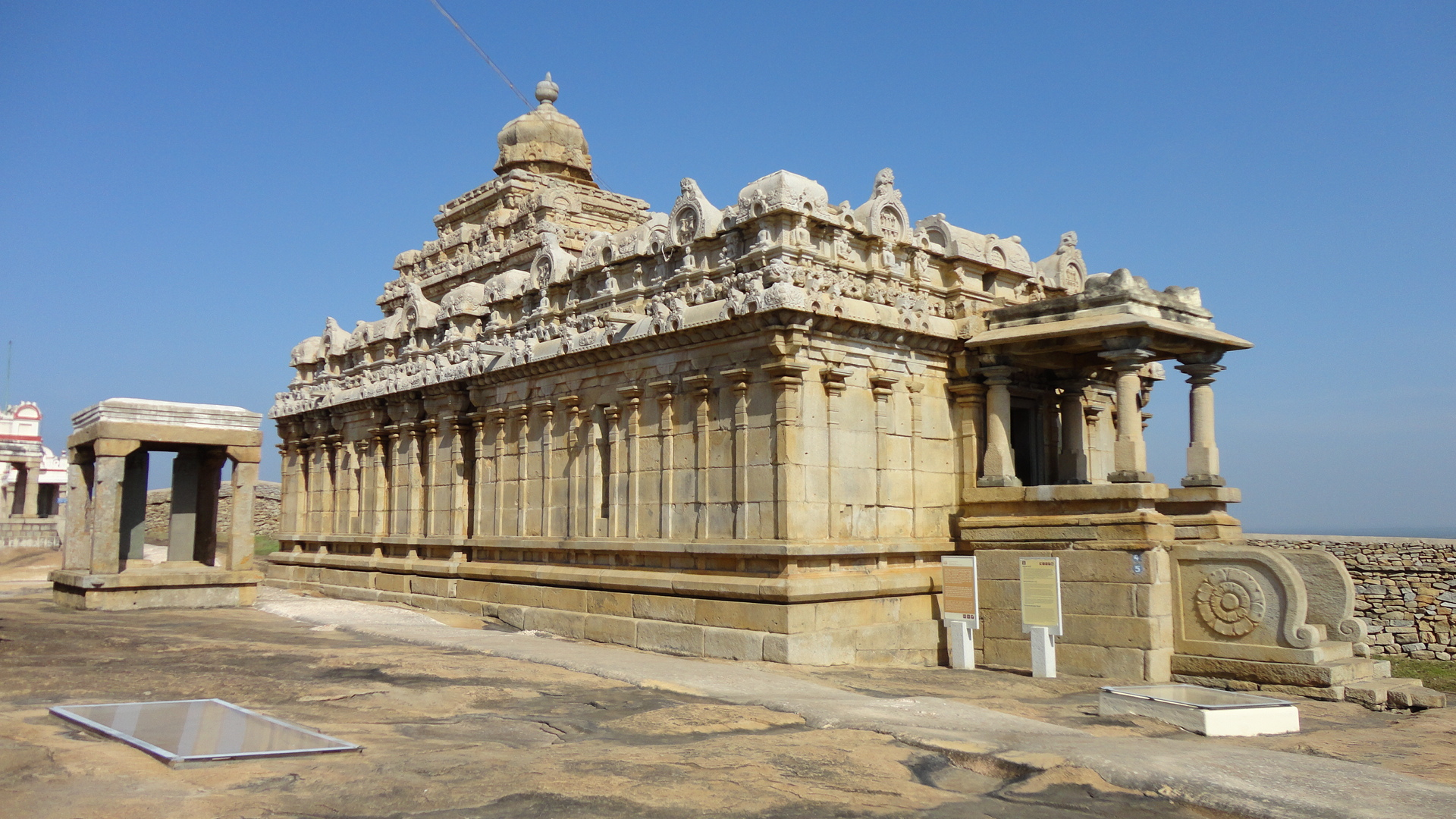
- Chavundaraya Basadi
- Born: c. 940 CE
- Died: 989 (aged 48–49)

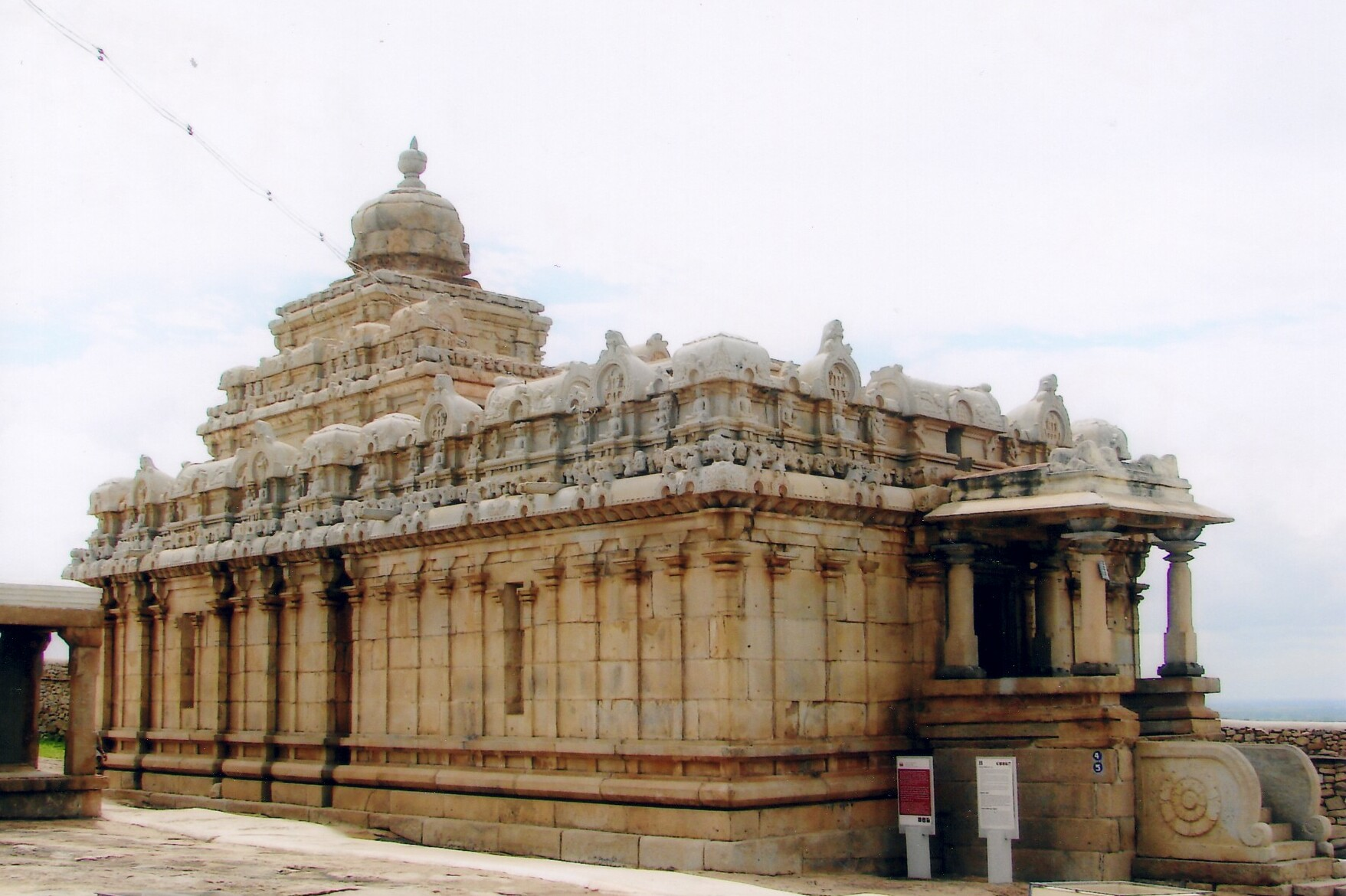
Chavundaraya basadi (10th century) on Chandragiri Hill

Cāmuṇḍarāya/Cāvuṇḍarāya or Chamundaraya/Chavundaraya (Kannada: ಚಾಮುಂಡರಾಯ/ಚಾವುಂಡರಾಯ Cāmuṇḍarāya/Cāvuṇḍarāya, 940–989) was a Jain minister in the court of the Western Ganga dynasty of Talakad (in modern Karnataka, India). His name also appears as Cauṇḍarāja and Cauṇḍarasa. A person of many talents, in 981 he commissioned the construction of the monolithic statue of Bahubali, the Gomateshwara, at Shravanabelagola, an important place of pilgrimage for Jainism. He was a devotee of the Jain Acharya Nemichandra and Ajitasena Bhattaraka and was an influential person during the reigns of Marasimha II Satyavakya, (963–975). Rachamalla IV Satyavakya, (975–986) and Rachamalla V (Rakkasaganga), (986–999).

A courageous commander with the title Samara Paraśurāma (lit, "Battle-Rama wielding an ax"), he found time to pursue his literary interests as well and became a renowned writer in Kannada and Sanskrit. One of his well-known works is the Cāvuṇḍarāya Purāṇa, also known as Triśaṣṭiśalāka Mahāpurāṇa, a prose collection of narratives about the Jain tīrthaṅkaras. He also wrote the Cāritrasāra in Sanskrit. He patronised the famous Kannada grammarians Gunavarma and Nagavarma I and the poet Ranna whose writing Paraśurāma Carite may have been a eulogy of his patron. Because of his many lasting contributions, Chavundaraya is an important figure in the history of medieval Karnataka.

== Origin ==
In his writing, he claims he was from the Brahmakshatriya Vamsa (Brahmin converted to the Kshatriya caste). The 10th century Algodu inscription of the Mysore district and the Arani inscription from the Mandya district provide more information on the family genealogy of Chavundaraya. It states that Chavundaraya was the grandson of Govindamayya who is praised for his knowledge and Dharma and was the son of Mabalayya, a subordinate of King Marasimha II. Mabalayya and his brother Isarayya are praised for their prowess in the inscription. It is believed that their political position under King Marasimha II may have led to a gradual adoption of Kshatriya status by this Brahmin family.

An inscriptional eulogy of Chavundaraya on the Tyagada Brahmadeva Pillar at Shravanabelagola (which has beautiful engravings and relief representing Chavundaraya and his guru Nemichandra at the base) praises him thus,

A sun in the shape of a jewel adorning the crest of the eastern mountains, the brahmaksatra race; a moon in the shape of the splendour of his fame causing to swell the ocean, the brahmaksatra race; the central gem to the pearl necklace of Lakshmi, procured from the Rohana mountain, the brahmaksatra race.

== Commander ==
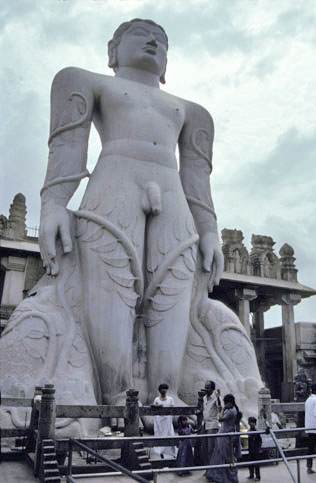
Gomateshwara monolith at Shravanabelagola (982–983 CE)

As a commander for the Western Ganga feudatory of the Rashtrakutas, he fought many battles for their Rashtrakutas overlords, beginning in the days of the Rashtrakuta king, Khottiga Amoghavarsha. In fact, the Gangas supported the cause of the Rashtrakutas till the very end. During the last years of Rashtrakuta rule, the Gangas were also under constant threat of civil war and from invasions of the increasingly powerful Chola Dynasty. When a civil war broke out in 975, Chavundaraya supported the cause of Prince Rachamalla IV and installed him on the throne.

Kongu historians Pulavar S.Raju and Pondheepankar point out in their works that his sister Puliabbai's sallekhana or fasting to death in the Vijayamangalam Jain temple, Kongu Nadu is marked by a stele inscription and thus he being a native of this region.A trilingual name inscription, also recorded in Tamil Pallava Grantha records his name in the left foot flank of the Gommateshwara monolith.

Chavundaraya suppressed a rebellion made by Panchaldeva Mahasamanta in 975 AD and slew Mudurachayya (who held the titles Chaladanka Ganga and Gangarabanta) in the battle of Bageyur. He thus avenged the death of his brother Nagavarma by Mudurachayya. After these battles where Chavundaraya showed his gallantry, Rachamalla IV ascended the Ganga throne. For his exploits, Chavundraya earned the titles Samara Parsurama, Vira Martanda, Ranarangasimha, Samara Dhurandhara, Vairikula Kaladanda, Bhuja Vikrama and Bhatamara.

== Writings ==
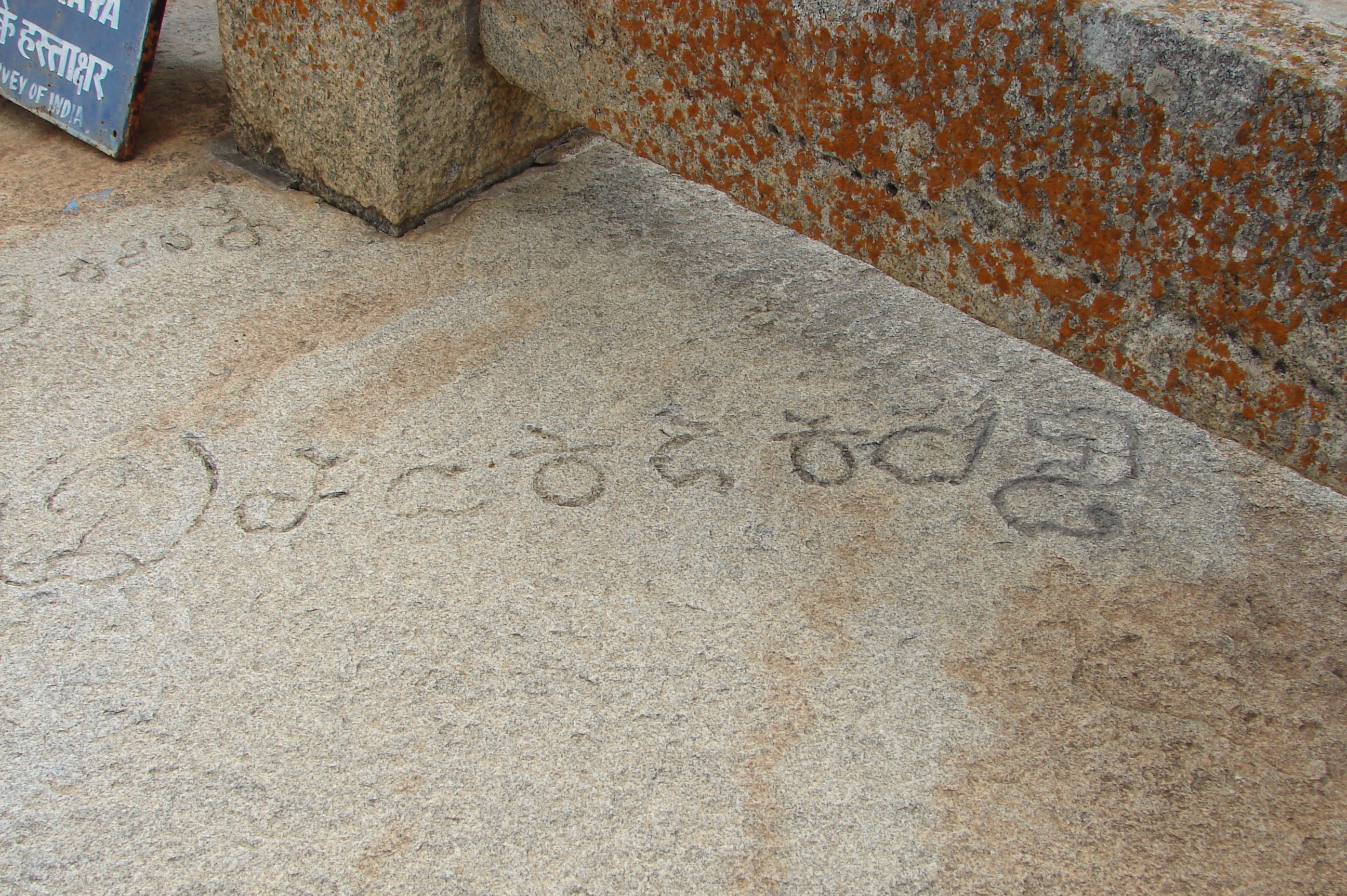
Inscribed handwriting (in Kannada characters) of Chavundaraya on Chandragiri hill in Shravanabelagola, Karnataka

Chavundaraya's writing, Cāvuṇḍarāya Purāṇa, is the second oldest existing work in prose style in Kannada and is based on Sanskrit works on the Jain tīrthaṅkaras, the Ādipurāṇa of Jinasena and Uttarapurāṇa of Gunabhadra during the rule of Rashtrakuta Amoghavarsha I. The prose work, composed in lucid Kannada, was meant mainly for the common man and avoided any reference to complicated elements of Jain doctrines and philosophy. In his writing, the influences of his predecessor Adikavi Pampa and contemporary Ranna are seen. Trishashtilakshana purana narrates the legends of twenty-four Jain Tirthankaras, twelve Chakravartis, nine Balabhadras, nine Narayanas and nine Pratinarayanas – narrations on sixty-three Jain proponents in all.

== Builder ==
The monolith Gomateshwara statue dedicated to the Jain god, Bahubali, was commissioned by Chavundaraya and built on the Indragiri hill (also known as Vindhyagiri Hill) is a unique example of Western Ganga sculpture. Carved from fine-grained white granite, the image stands on a lotus. It has no support up to the thighs and is 60 feet tall with the face measuring 6.5 feet. With the serene expression on the face of the image, its curled hair with graceful locks, its proportional anatomy, the monolith size, and the combination of its artistry and craftsmanship have led it to be called the mightiest achievement in sculptural art in medieval Karnataka. It is the largest monolithic statue in the world. The Chavundaraya basadi also in Shravanabelagola and built on the Chandragiri Hill is credited to him by some scholars while others argue it was built by his son Jinadevana. However, by the 12th century additions to the shrine were made by a later King Gangaraja by which time tradition held that the shrine was built by Chavundaraya. However another view holds that the original shrine itself was consecrated in the 11th century and built in memory of Chavundaraya.
