= Chavundaraya Basadi =

Jain temple in Karnataka, India

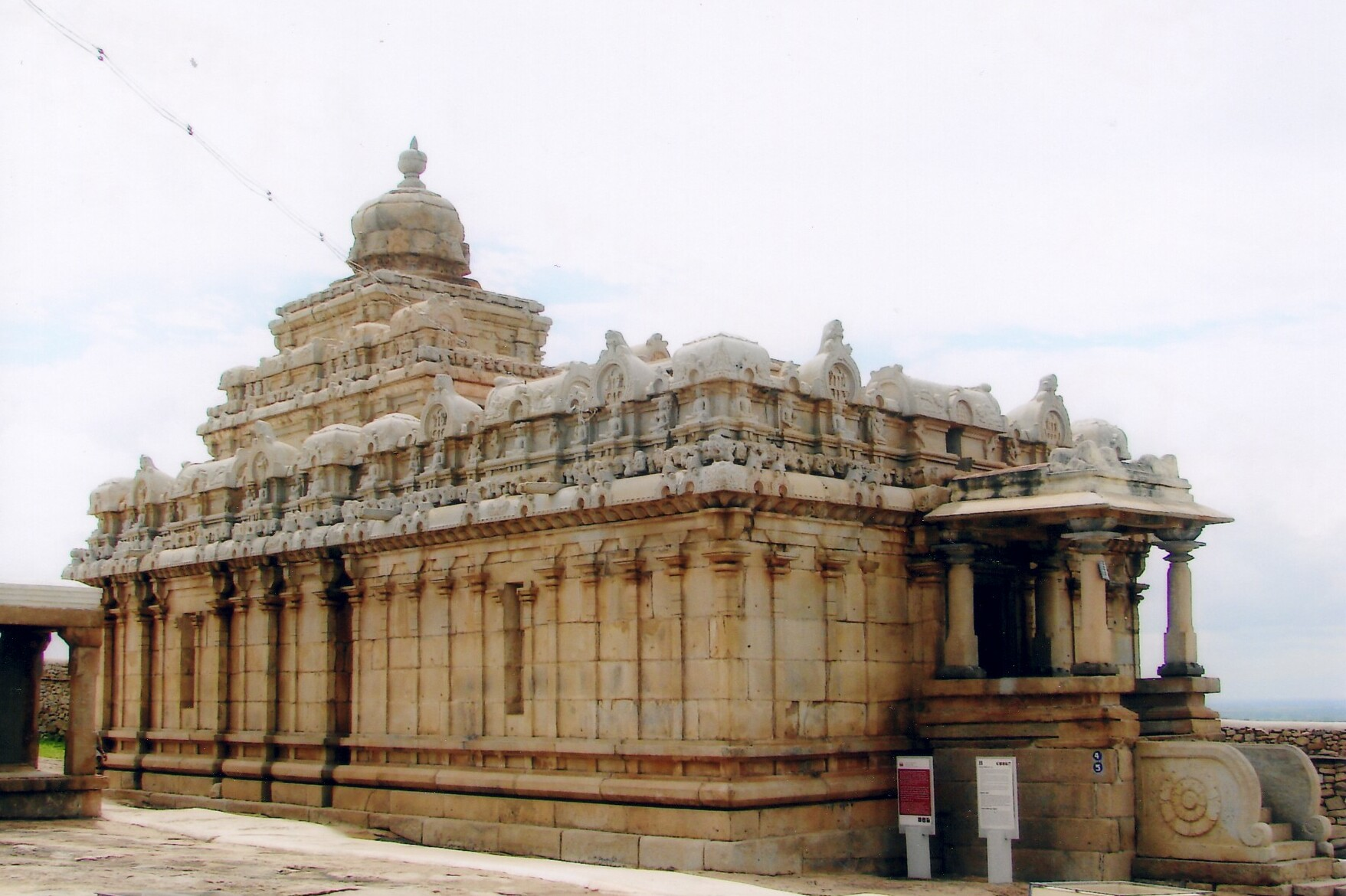
- Chavundaraya Basadi at Shravanabelagola

Religion
- Affiliation: Jainism
- Deity: Neminatha
- Festival: Mahavir Jayanti
- Governing body: Shri Shravana Belgola Jain Matha

Location
- Location: Shravana Belgola, Hassan, Karnataka
- Interactive map of Chavundaraya Basadi
- Coordinates: 12°51′42.19″N 76°29′12.38″E

Architecture
- Style: Dravidian architecture
- Creator: Chavundaraya
- Established: 982 AD

Chavundaraya basadi or Chamundaraya basadi or Boppa-Chaityalya is one of the fifteen basadis (Jain temples) located on the Chandragiri Hill in Shravanabelagola in the Indian state of Karnataka. Archaeological Survey of India has listed the Chavundaraya basadi in group of monuments in Shravanabelagola as Adarsh Smarak Monument.

== History ==
Chavundaraya basadi was erected by Chavundaraya during the reign of Ganga King Marasimha II in 982 CE and completed by Chavundaraya's son Jinadeva. The idol of Neminatha, flanked by Chauri bearers, is believed to installed by Hoysala period attributing to the characteristics matching Hoysala art. The temple is also known as Sruta-tirtha (transl. sacred places of scripture) because 10th century Jain Acharya Nemichandra composed Gommatsāra here.

The temple underwent improvement in the 12th century under the rule of Chola Empire. The pyramidal shikhara crowned with domical finial is example of Chola architecture. In c. 12th-century CE, a pillared porch was added to the temple complex.

== Architecture ==
Chavundaraya basadi along with Suparshwanath, Kattale and Chandragupta basadi is considered the most important for the architecture in Jain temple complex of Chandragiri Hill with Chavundaraya basadi as the finest and largest. This temple is built in Dravidian architecture and famous for its artistry. The temple houses a garbhagriha, pradakshinapatha, open sukansi, navaranga and mukhamandapa. Above the garbhagriha is a dvitala vimana. The garbhagriha houses an idol of Neminatha flanked by Chauri bearers and the one first floor of the vimana houses the image of Parshavanatha installed by Jinadeva in 985 CE.

Chavundaraya basadi is a 68 by 36 feet (21 m × 11 m) two-story shrine with a shikhara built-in Dravidian style. This temple is the largest shrine in Shravanabelagola with ornamental niches with figures of yakshi and Jain monks in padmasan posture. The build Western Gangas style. The architecture of this temple was influenced by Chalukyan style in Aihole and Badami temple complex. The mulnayak of the temple is a black-coloured idol of Neminatha. The temple also houses an idol of Ambika seated under a mango tree with amra-lumbi (mango tree branch) in the right hand and citron in left.

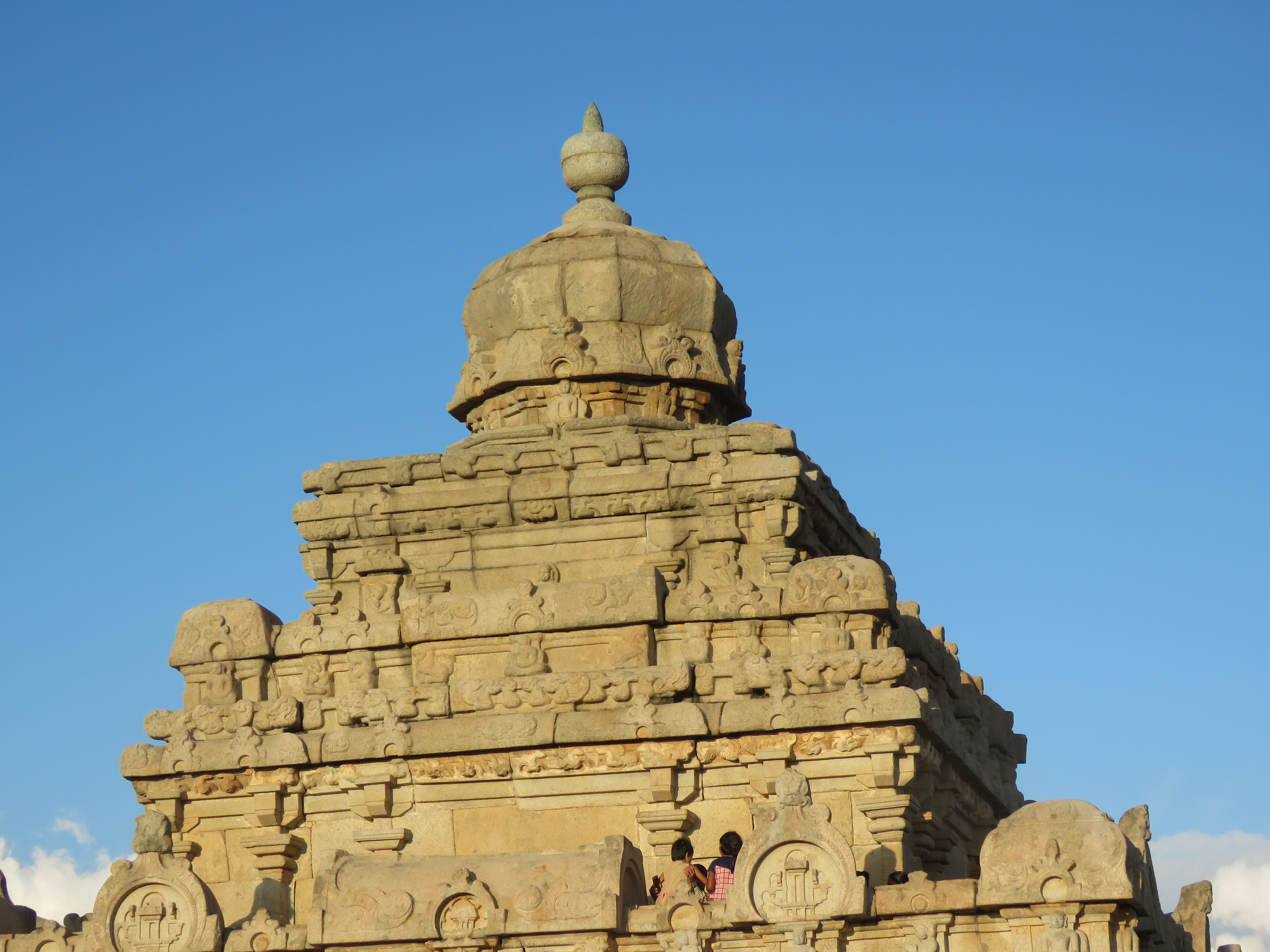
Shikhara of temple

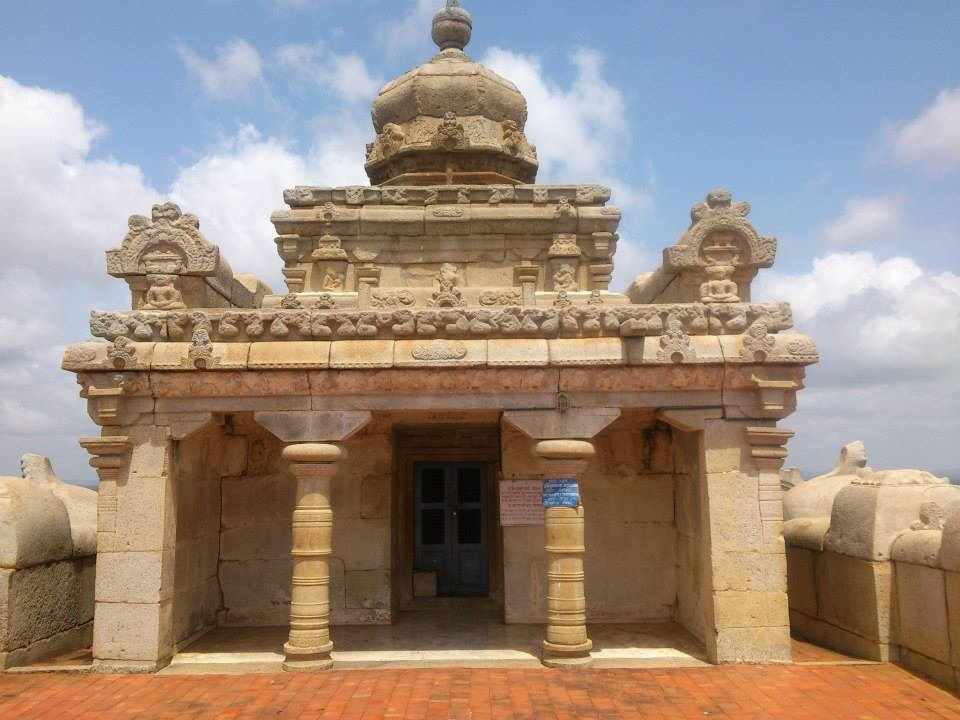
Melina basti, on second storey of Chavundaraya basadi

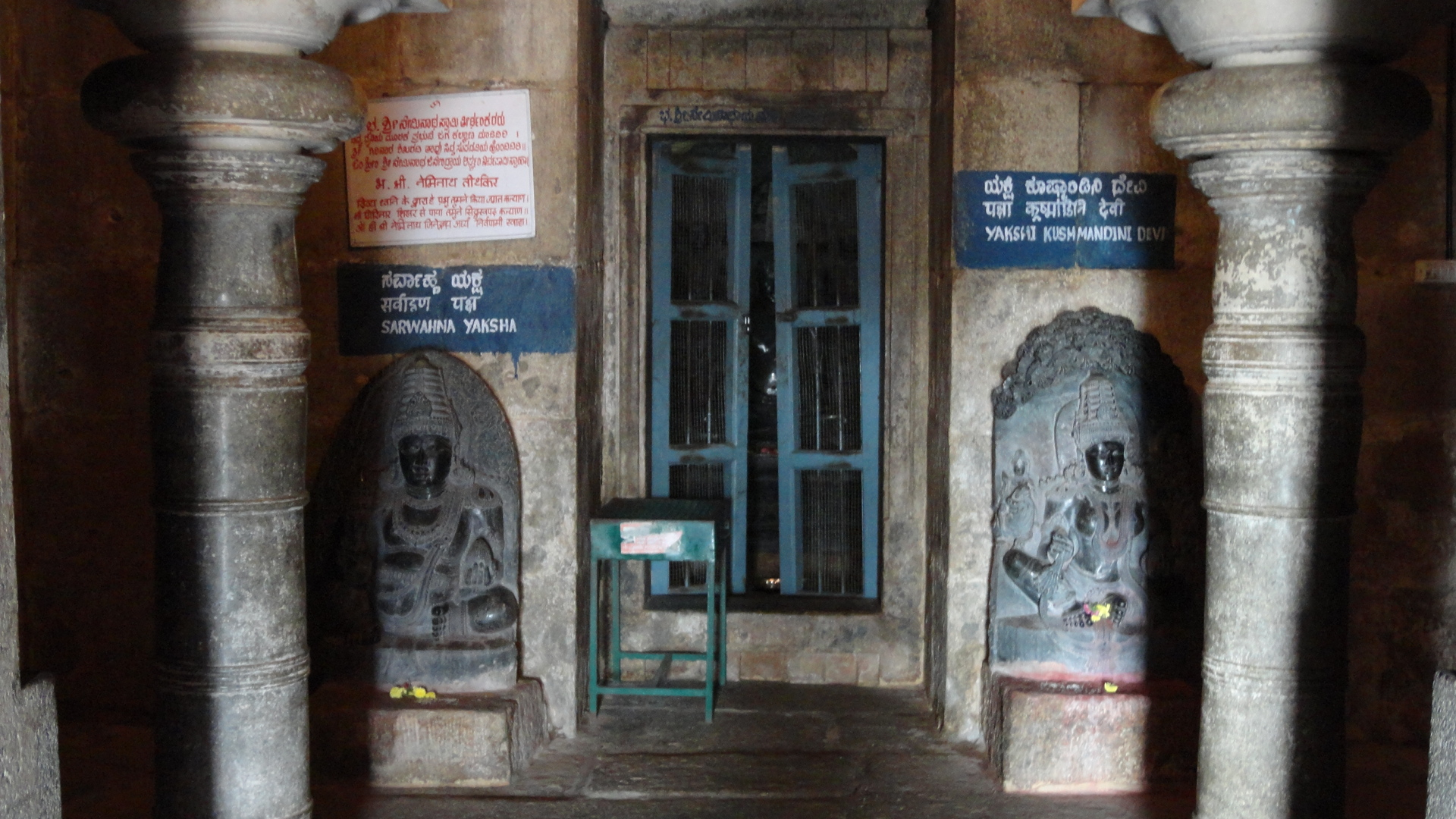
Sarvahana and Ambika

== Protection ==
The temple is protected as a monument of national importance by the Archaeological Survey of India.

== See also ==
- Odegal basadi
- Shantinatha Basadi, Jinanathapura
- Akkana Basadi, Shravanabelagola
- Chandragupta basadi
