= Shravanabelagola =

Town in Karnataka, India

Shravanabelagola ಶ್ರವಣಬೆಳಗೊಳ
- Town
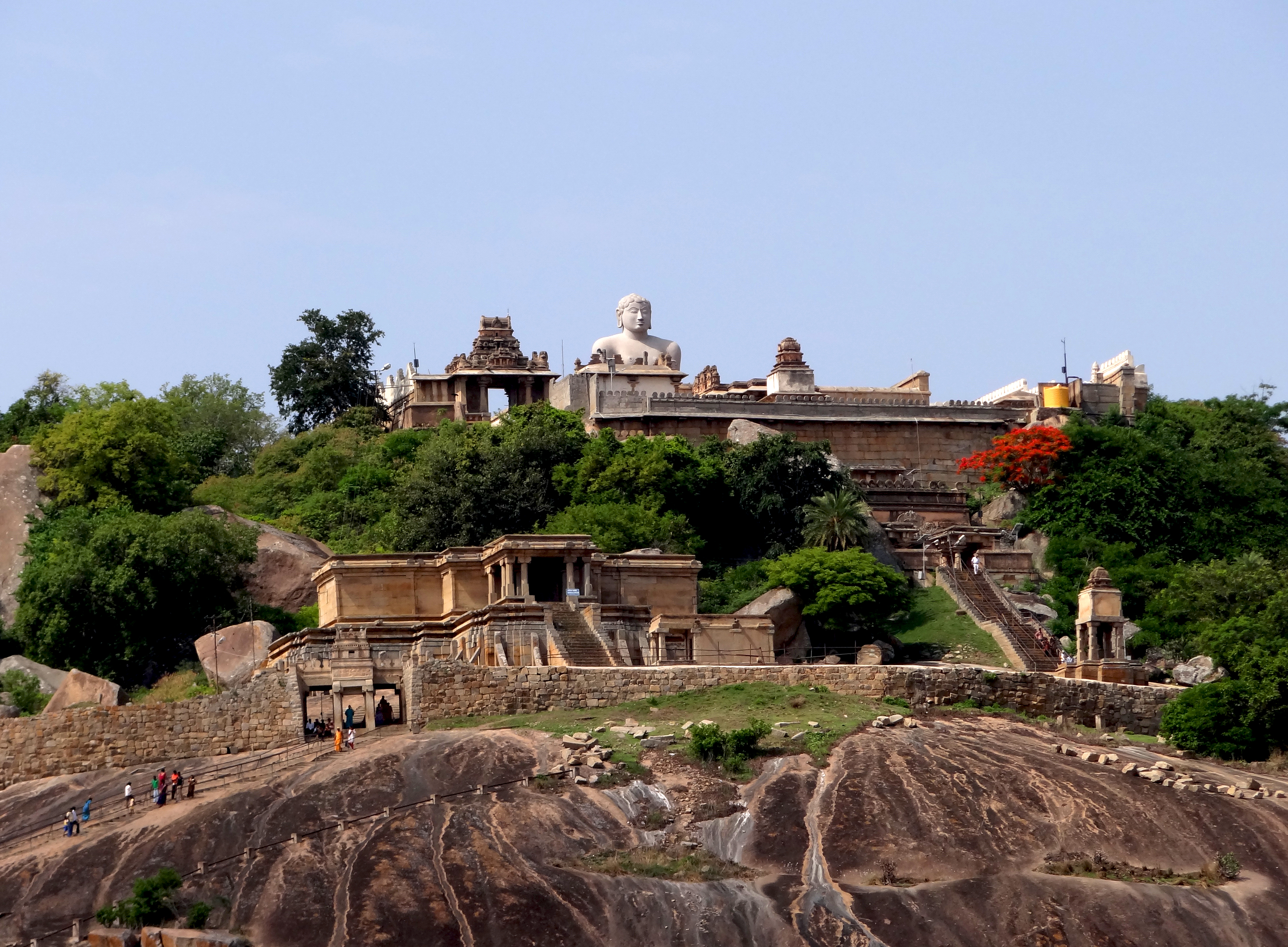
- The Gommateshwara statue dated 978-993 on Vindhyagiri Hill

- Shravanabelagola Shravanabelagola (Karnataka)
- Coordinates: 12.859°N 76.489°E
- Country: India
- State: Karnataka
- District: Hassan
- Taluka: Channarayapatna

Area
  - Total: 7.60 km^{2} (2.93 sq mi)
- Elevation: 871 m (2,858 ft)

Population (2011)
  - Total: 6,485
- Time zone: UTC+5:30 (IST)

Shravanabelagola (pronunciation: [ɕɾɐ.ʋɐˈɳɐ bɛ.ɭɐ.go.ɭɐ]) is a town located near Channarayapatna taluk of Hassan district in the Indian state of Karnataka and is 144 km (89 mi) from Bengaluru. The Gommateshwara Bahubali statue at Shravanabelagola is one of the most important tirthas (pilgrimage destinations) in Jainism, one that reached a peak in architectural and sculptural activity under the patronage of Western Ganga dynasty of Talakad. Chandragupta Maurya is said to have died on the hill of Chandragiri, which is located in Shravanabelagola, in 298 BCE after he became a Jain monk and assumed an ascetic life style.

Gommateshwara statue, Akkana Basadi, Chandragupta basadi, Chamundaraya Basadi, Parshvanath Basadi and inscriptions of Shravanabelagola group of monuments are listed as Adarsh Smarak Monument by Archaeological Survey of India.

== Location ==
Shravanabelagola is located at 11 km (6.8 mi) to the south-east of Channarayapatna in the Channarayapatna taluk of Hassan district of Karnataka. It is at a distance of 51 km (32 mi) south-east of Hassan, Karnataka, the district centre. It is situated at a distance of 12 km (7.5 mi) to the south from the Bengaluru-Mangaluru road (NH-75), 18 km (11 mi) from Hirisave, 78 km (48 mi) from Halebidu, 89 km (55 mi) from Belur, 83 km (52 mi) from Mysuru, 144 km (89 mi) from Bengaluru, the capital of Karnataka and 222 km (138 mi) from Mangaluru.

Sacred places are spread over two hills, Chandragiri and Vindyagiri, and also among the villages at the foothills.

== Etymology ==
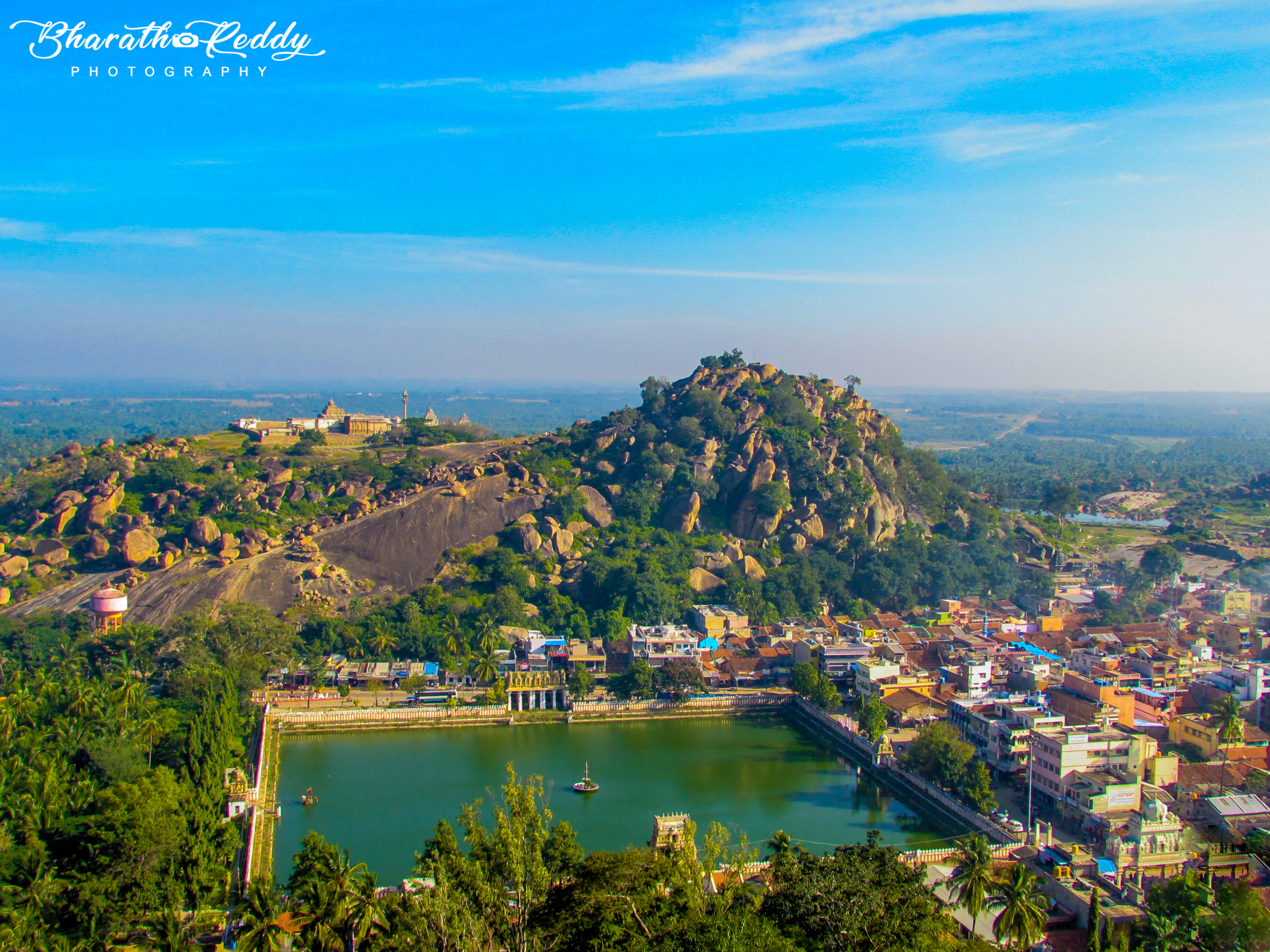
The pond in the middle of the town, after which it is named, Beḷagoḷa “White Pond”

Shravanabelagola "White Pond of the Shravana" is named with reference to the colossal image of Gommaṭa - the prefix Śravaṇa serves to distinguish it from other Belagolas with the prefixes Hale- and Kodi-, while Beḷagoḷa (ಬೆಳ್ಳಗಿನ + ಕೊಳ) in Kannada means "white pond" is an allusion to the pond in the middle of the town. The Sanskrit equivalents Śvetasarovara, Dhavalasarovara and Dhavalasarasa used in the inscriptions that support this meaning. There are more than 560 inscriptions in Shravanabelagola.

Some inscriptions mention the name of the place as Beḷagoḷa, which has given rise to another derivation from the plant Solanum ferox (hairy-fruited eggplant). This derivation is in allusion to a tradition which says that a pious old woman completely anointed the colossal image with the milk brought by her in a gullakayi or eggplant. The place is also designated as Devara Beḷagoḷa "White Pond of the God" and Gommaṭapuram "city of Gommaṭa" in some epigraphs.

== History ==
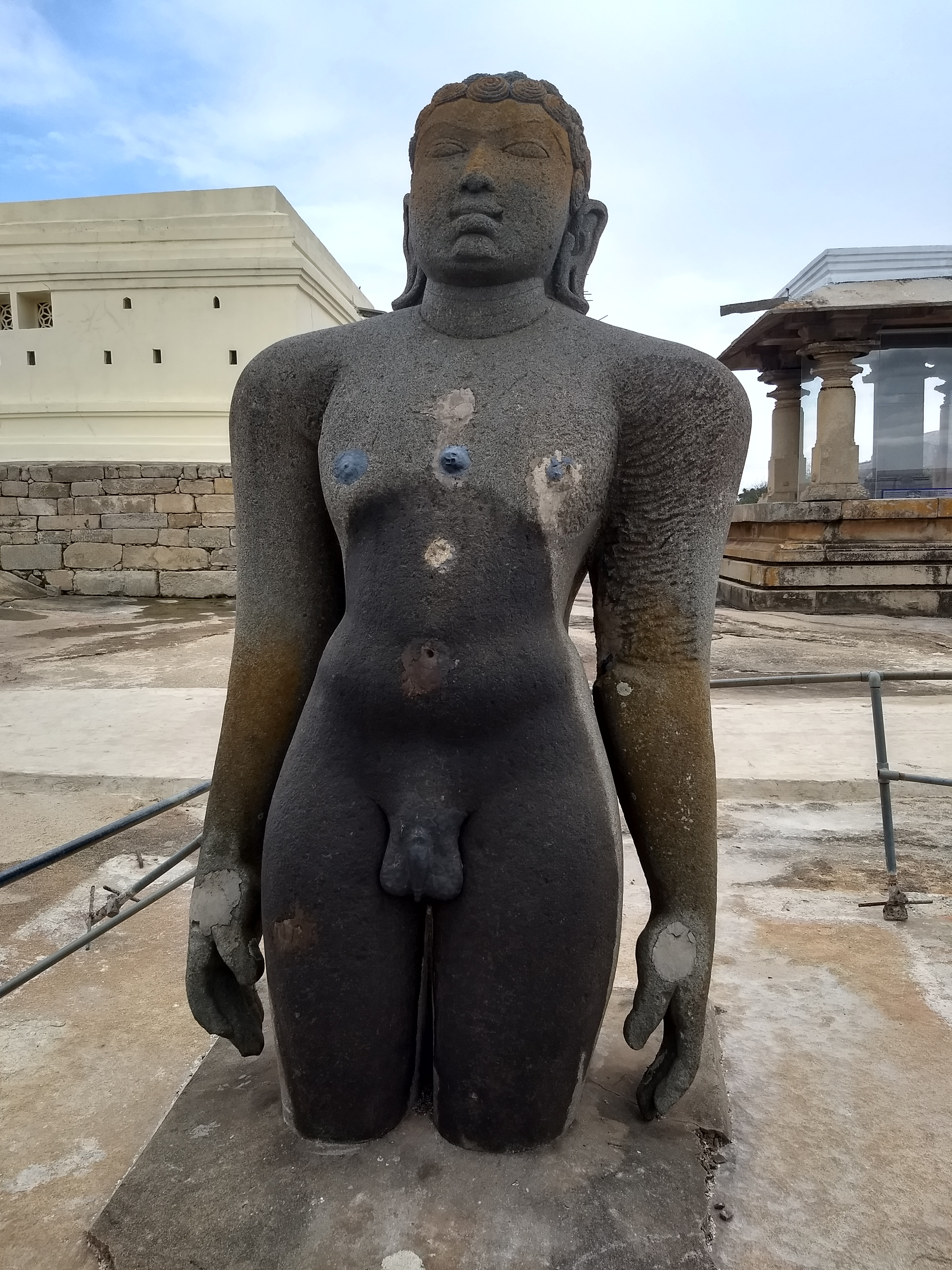
Statue of Emperor Bharata.

Shravanabelagola has two hills, Chandragiri and Vindhyagiri. Acharya Bhadrabahu and his pupil Chandragupta Maurya are believed to have meditated there. Chandragupta Basadi, which was dedicated to Chandragupta Maurya, was originally built there by Ashoka in the third century BCE. Chandragiri also has memorials to numerous monks and Śrāvakas who have meditated there since the fifth century CE, including the last king of the Rashtrakuta dynasty of Manyakheta. Chandragiri also has a famous temple built by Chavundaraya.

The 58-feet tall monolithic statue of Gommateshwara is located on Vindyagiri. It is considered to be the world's largest monolithic statue. The base of the statue has an inscriptions in Prakrit, dating from 981 CE. The inscription praises the king who funded the effort and his general, Chavundaraya, who erected the statue for his mother. Every twelve years, thousands of devotees congregate here to perform the Mahamastakabhisheka, a spectacular ceremony in which the statue is anointed with Water, Turmeric, Rice flour, Sugar cane juice, Sandalwood paste, saffron, and gold and silver flowers. Recently Mahamastakabhisheka was held in 2018 during feb month. The next Mahamastakabhisheka will be held in 2030.

Shravanabelagola, nestled by the Vindhyagiri and Chandragiri Hills, protected by the monolith Bhagwan Bahubali, and home to over 2,300 years of Jain heritage, spans centuries of history. In the town of Shravanabelagola stands a colossal rock-cut statue of Gommateshwara Shri Bahubali. Roughly eight hundred inscriptions which The Karnataka Archeological Department has collected roughly eight hundred inscriptions nearby, which are mostly Jaina and cover an extended period from 600 to 1830 CE. Some refer to the era of Chandragupta Maurya and also relate the story of the first settlement of Jains at Shravanabelagola. The village was a seat of learning, and a priest from here named Akalanka was in 788 CE summoned to the court of Himasitala at Kanchi where having confuted the Buddhists in public disputation, he was instrumental in gaining their expulsion from the South of India to Ceylon.

== Inscriptions ==
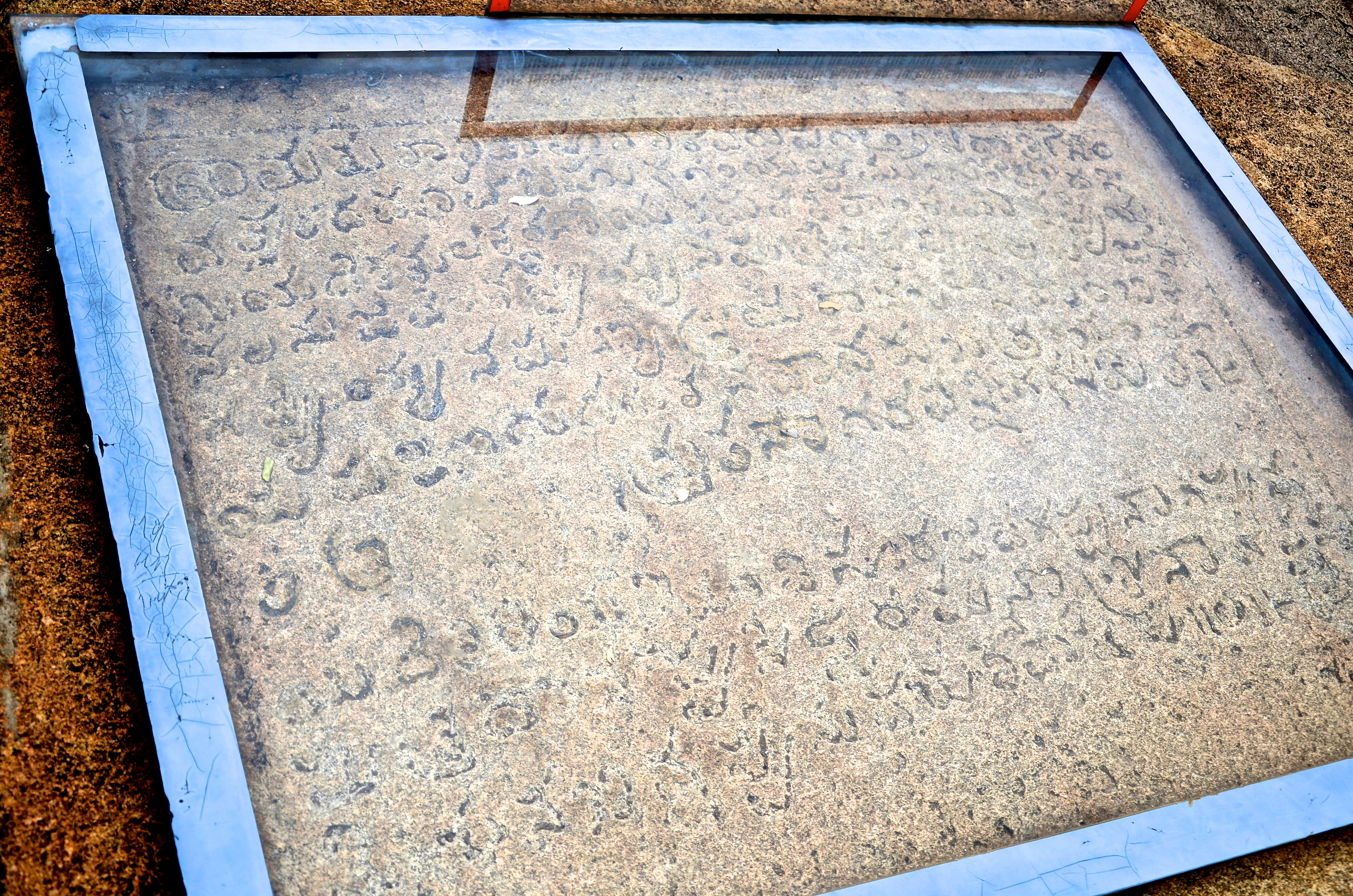
Kannada inscription at Odegal Basadi

More than 800 inscriptions have been found at Shravanabelagola, dating to various times from 600 CE to 1830 CE. A large number of these are found in the Chandragiri and the rest can be seen in the Vindhyagiri Hill and the town. Most of the inscriptions at the Chandragiri date back before the 10th century. These inscriptions include texts in the Kannada. The second volume of Epigraphia Carnatica, written by B. Lewis Rice, is dedicated to the inscriptions found here. It is said to be the oldest Marathi inscription. The inscriptions are written in Purvahalagannada (Ancient Kannada) and Halegannada (Old Kannada) characters. Some of these inscriptions mention the rise and growth in power of the Western Ganga Dynasty, the Rashtrakutas, the Hoysala Empire, the Vijayanagara Empire and the Udaiyaar dynasty. These inscriptions have helped modern scholars to understand the nature and development of the Kannada language and its literature.

Tyagada Brahmadeva Pillar is a decorated freestanding pillar (lit, Stambha), 2.3 m (7.5 ft) tall, commissioned by Chamundaraya. The pillar dates to around 983 CE and exists on the Vindyagiri hill (called Dodda Betta in local Kannada language. On the base of the pillar, on the north side, is an inscription in old Kannada language of the same period.

== Basadi ==
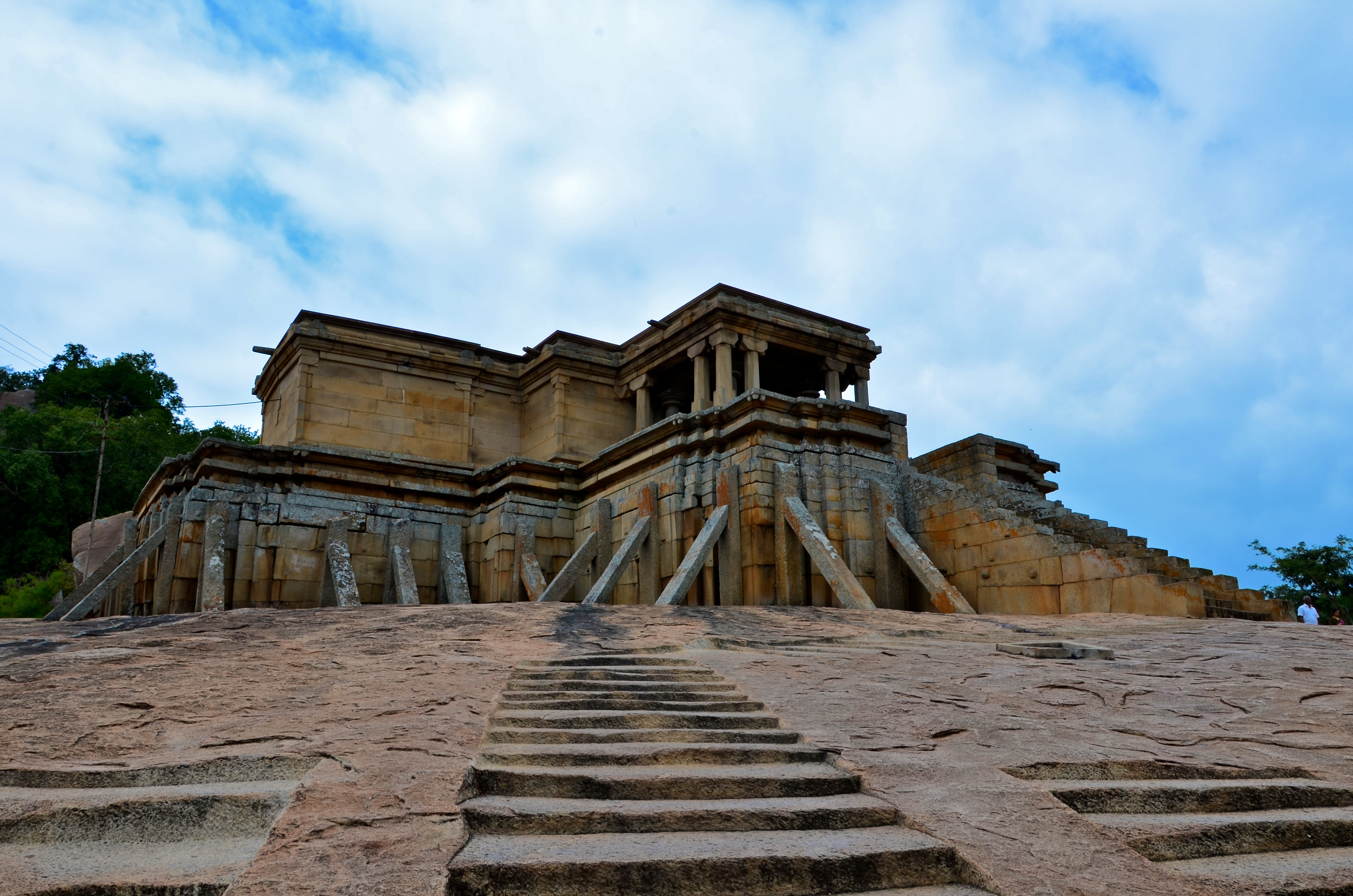
Odegal basadi on Vindhyagiri hill

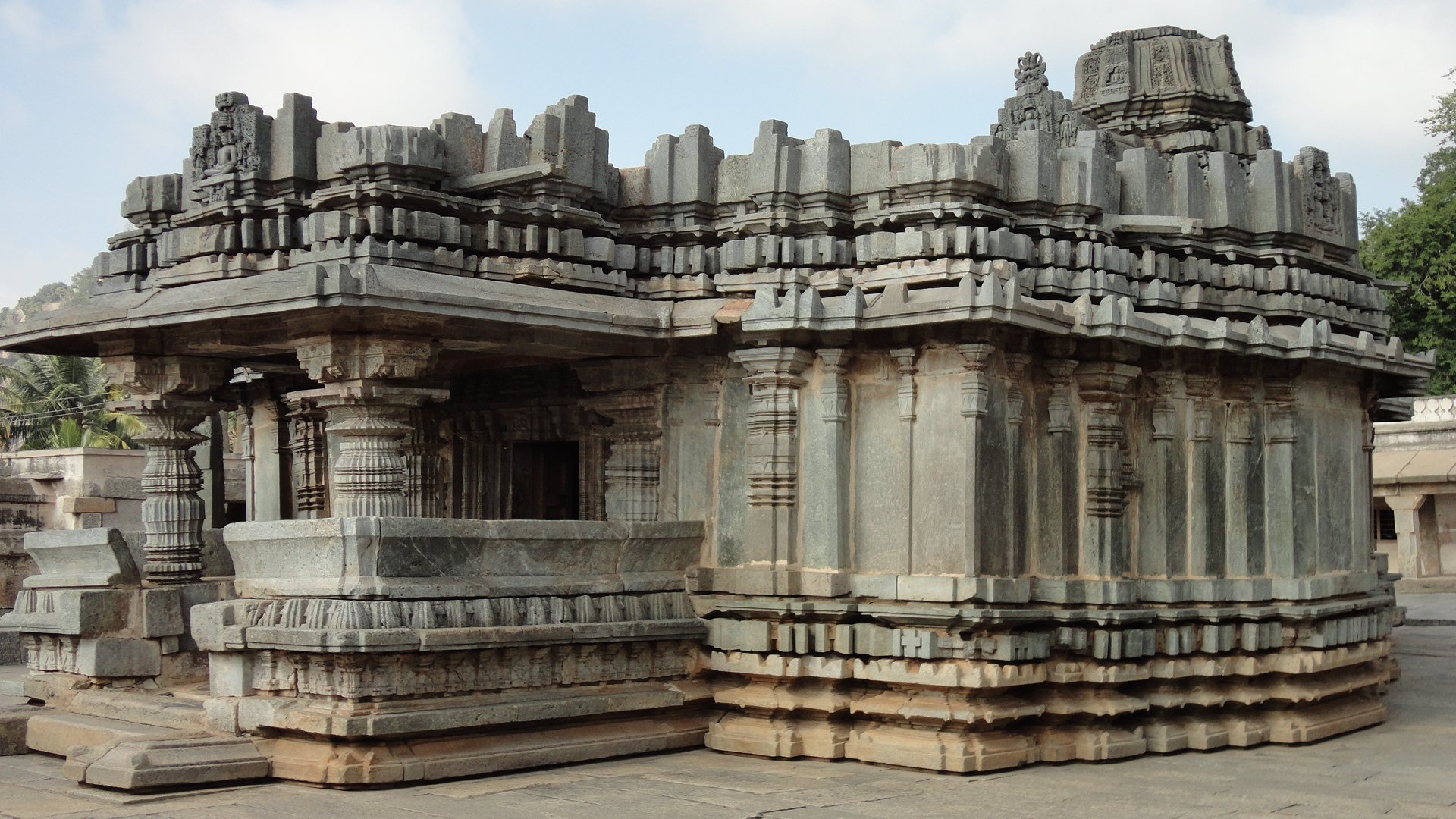
Akkana Basadi

Vindhyagiri hill

1. Odegal basadi is the largest basadi on Vindhyagiri hill. The temple derives the name from 'Odega', that is, soapstone used for strengthening the walls of the temple. The temple houses image of Rishabhanatha, Neminatha and Shantinatha.

Chandragiri hill

1. Chandragupta basadi was established in the 9th century. The middle cell of this temple has the figure of Parshvanatha, the one to the right the figure of Padmavathi and the one to the left the figure of Kushmandini, all in a seated posture.
2. Chamundaraya Basadi is one of the largest temples on the hill. It is also known as Chavundaraya Basadi. It is dedicated to Neminatha, the 22nd Tirthankara. The sukhanasi consists of good figures of Sarvahna and Kushmandini, the yaksha and yakshi of Neminatha. It is dated back to 982 CE.
3. Parshvanath Basadi is one of the two tallest temple tallest structure in Shravanabelagola. the temple houses a 18 feet (5.5 m) monolithic colossal of Parshvanatha. The temple dates back to 12th century. The front of the temple has a 65.6 feet (20.0 m) tall manastambha.
4. Kattale Basadi is the largest temple on the hill. The temple features a garbhagriha, pradakshinapatha, sukanasa and a navranga joined by 16 pillars. the temple's front is joined with Chandragupta basadi. The temple houses an idol of Rishabhanatha flanked by chauri bearers.

The Sasana Basadi, Savitagandharva Basadi, Terina Basadi and Santiswara Basadi are other important temples on the Chandragiri hill.

In town

1. Akkana Basadi was built in 1181 CE. Akkana Basadi has 23rd Tirthankara Parshwanath as main deity of the temple.
2. Bhandari basadi is the largest temple in Shravanabelagola and enshrines idols of 24 tirthankar in arranged in a single row. The temple was constructed by Hula Raja, a general and bhandari (transl. treasurer) during the reign of King Narasimha I of Hoysala Empire in 1159 CE.

== Mahamastakabhisheka ==
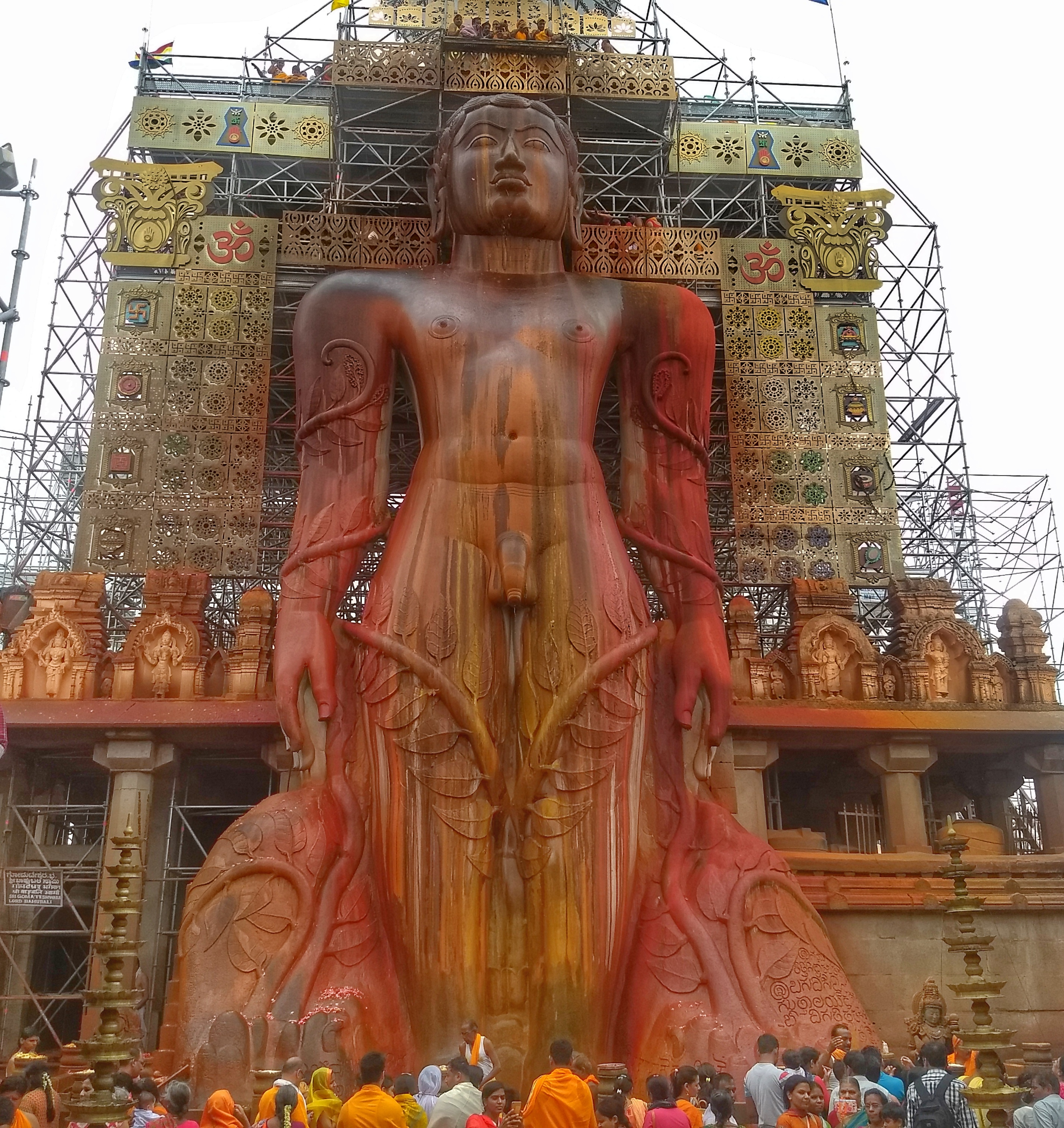
Mahamastakabhisheka of Gommateshwara statue

The Mahamastakabhisheka (Grand Consecration/The Great Indian Festival), refers to the abhiṣheka (anointment) of the Jain images when held on a large scale. The most famous of such consecrations is the anointment of the Bahubali Gommateshwara Statue located at Shravanabelagola. It is an important Jain festival held once in every 12 years. It is an integral part of the ancient and composite Jain tradition. The festival is held in veneration of a 17.3736 metres (57.000 ft) high monolithic statue of the Siddha Bahubali. The anointing last took place in February 2018, and the next ceremony is going to take place in 2030. During this festival, the statue is then bathed and anointed with libations such as milk, sugarcane juice, and saffron paste, and sprinkled with powders of sandalwood, turmeric, and vermilion.

The event has been attended by multiple political personalities including Krishna-Rajendra Wodeyar in 1910, Jawaharlal Nehru in 1951, Indira Gandhi in 1967 and 1981, A. P. J. Abdul Kalam in 2006, and Narendra Modi and Ramnath Kovind in 2018.

== Other notable things ==
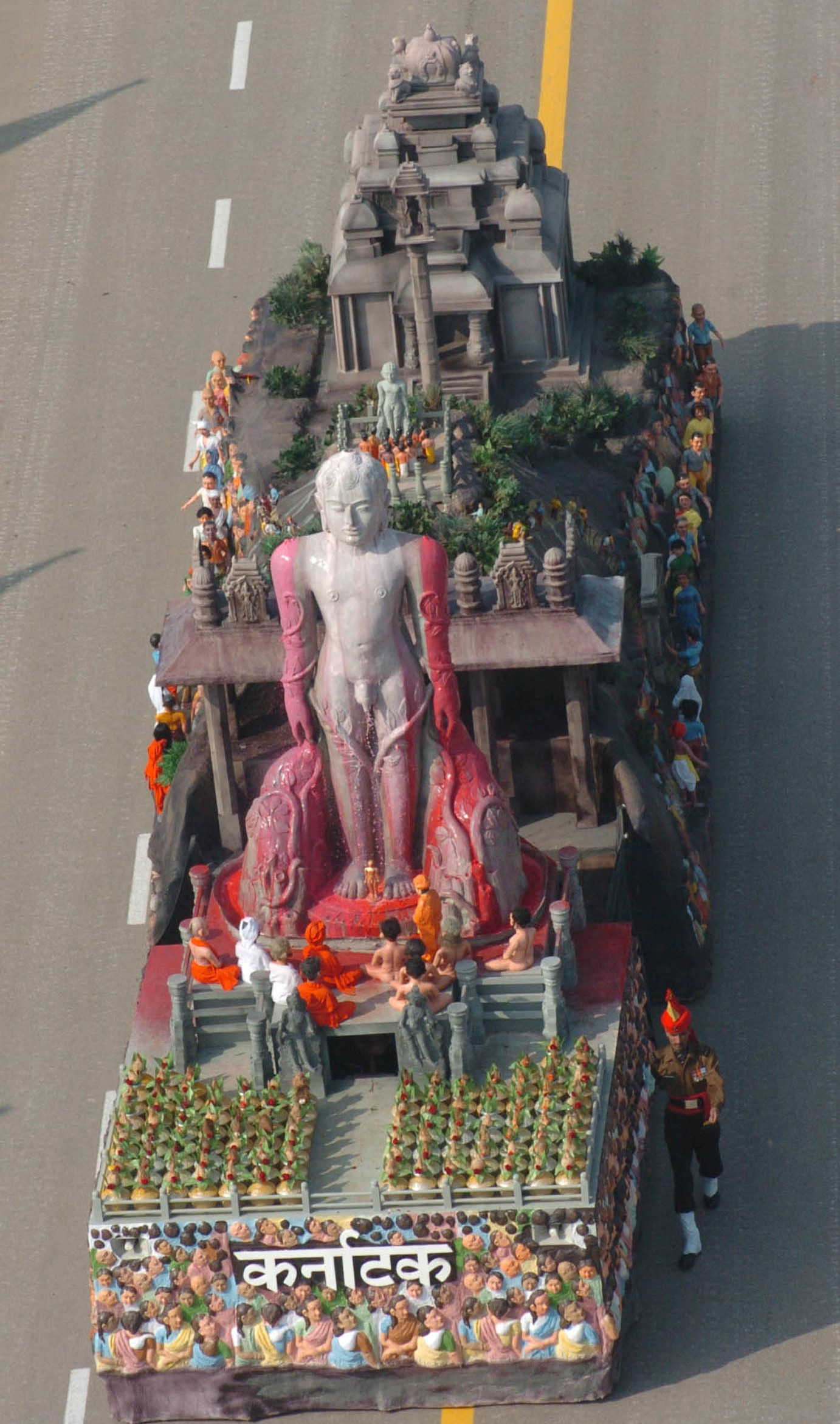
The tableau of Karnataka depicting Mahamastabhisheka of Gommateshwara, during the Republic Day Parade in 2005

Shravanabelagola is the seat of the ancient Bhattaraka Matha, belonging to the Desiya Gana lineage of Mula Sangh, from the Digambara monastic tradition. Bahubali College of Engineering is an educational institute at Shravaṇabeḷagoḷa.

Shravanabelagola is also part of the route followed by the luxury tourist train, the Golden Chariot.

The government of Karnataka showcased the statue of Gometashwara at the Republic Day Parade of 2005 where it received the first prize from the then President of India Honourable Dr. A. P. J. Abdul Kalam.

On August 5, 2007, the statue at Shravanabelagola was voted by the readers of Times of India as the first of the Seven Wonders of India with 49% votes in favor of the statue.

Archaeological Survey of India has listed the group of monuments in Shravanabelagola as Adarsh Smarak Monument.

== See also ==
- Kantharajapura
- Shravaneri
- Venur
- Dharmasthala
- Karkala
- Jainism in Karnataka
- List of Jain temples
- Jain temples, Halebidu
- Kalya Jaina-Srivaishnava conflict resolution Inscription
