= Chandragiri Hill =

Hill on which Chandragupta Maurya performed penance in last life

Chandragiri hill
- Hill with religious complex
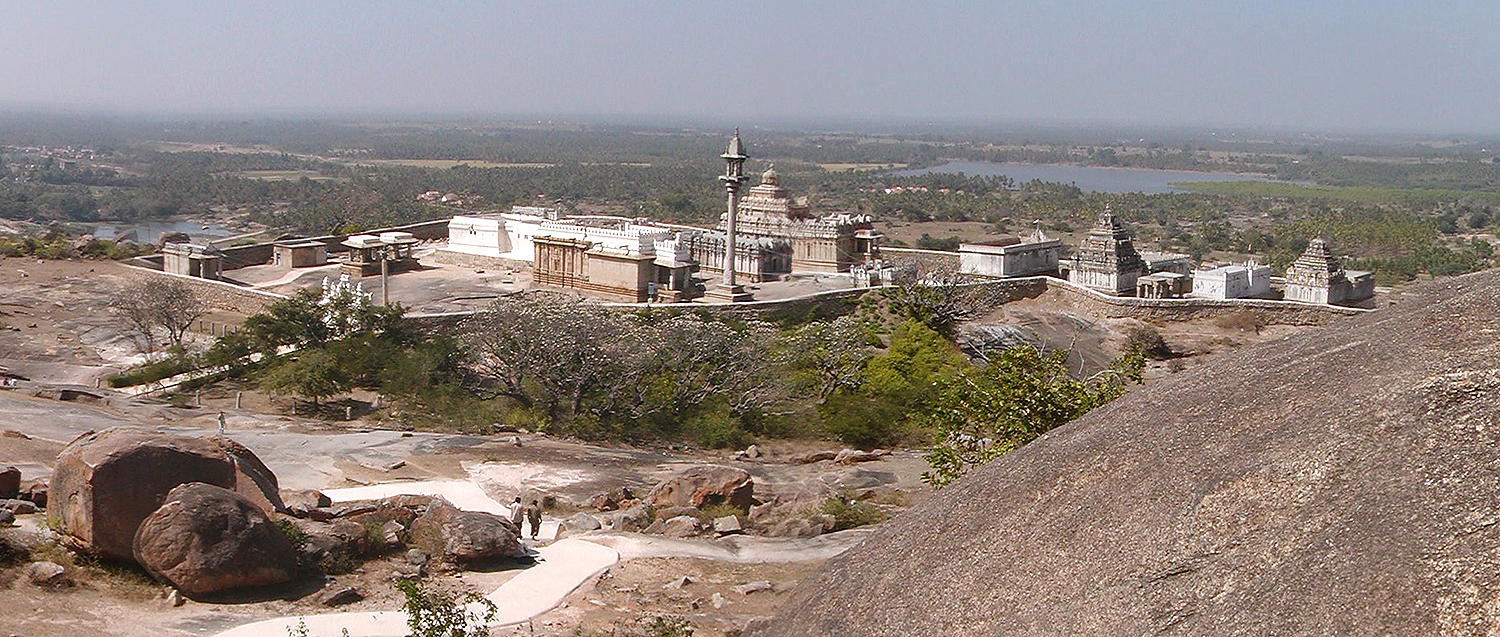
- Chandragiri Temple Complex

- Chandragiri hill Chandragiri hill (Karnataka)
- Coordinates: 12°51′42″N 76°29′16″E
- Country: India
- State: Karnataka
- District: Hassan
- Time zone: UTC+5:30 (IST)

Chandragiri, also known as Chikka betta is one of the two hills in Shravanabelagola in the Indian state of Karnataka, the other one being Vindhyagiri. It is also designated as Indragiri.

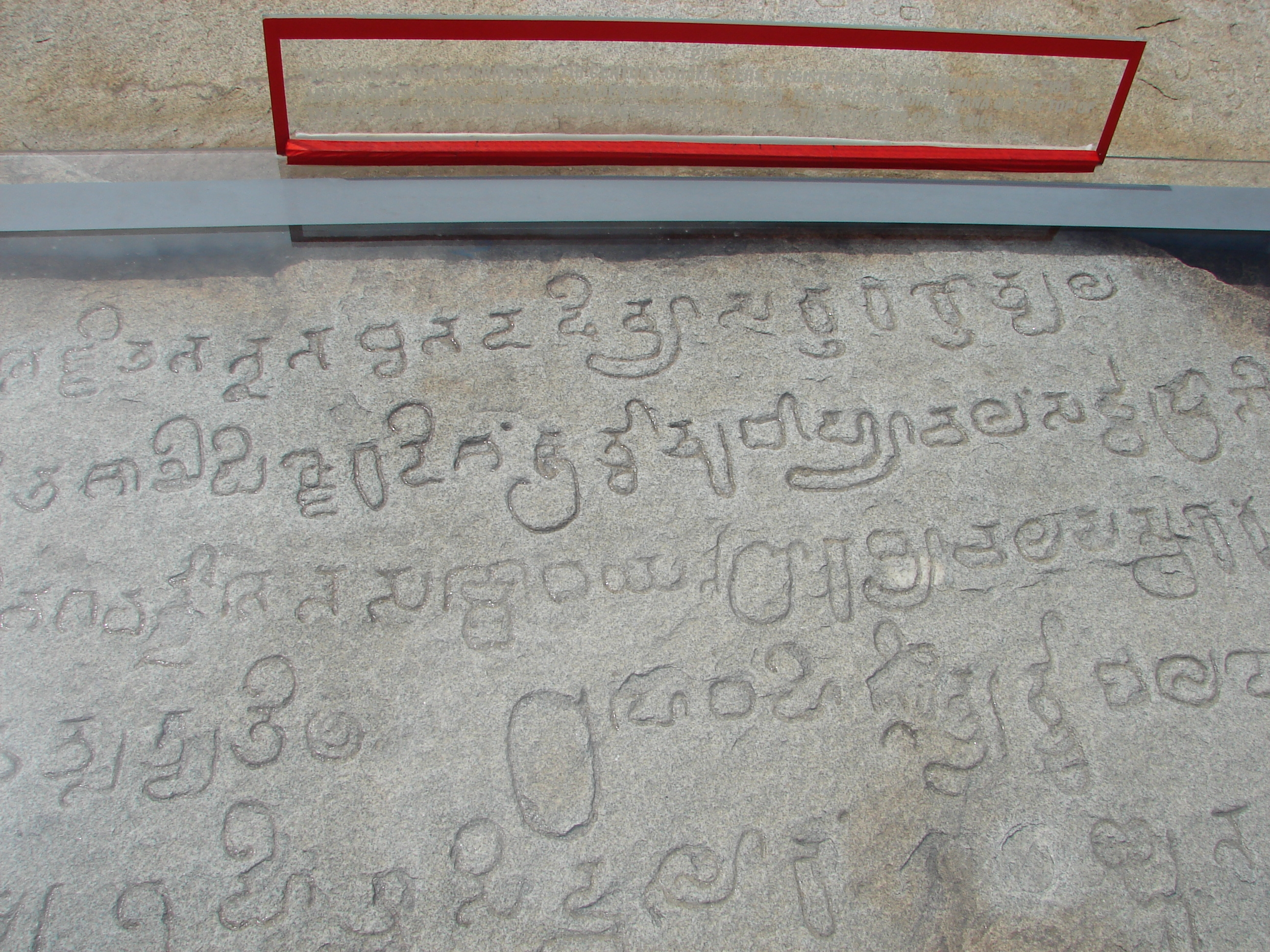
7th century Old Kannada inscription on Chandragiri, Shravanabelagola

== History ==
The recorded history surrounding the hill started in 300 BC when last Shruthakevali Bhadrabahu and Chandragupta Maurya visited the place in order to attain kaivalya (beatitude). The small hill derives its name of Chandra because Chandragupta was the first of the rishis who lived and performed penance there.

Kalbappu was the early name of the hill and it dominates the history of the town of Shravanabelagola between 3rd century BC and 12th century AD. The Jain traditions link the Mauryan Emperor Chandragupta and his teacher Bhadrabahu with this place. Of the total number of 106 memorials found at Shravanabelagola, 92 are located on the small hill. Of these, about 47 memorials of monks, 9 of nuns, and 5 of householders belong to the 7th and 8th century. This points out at the popularity of the custom, and of its extensive prevalence on the small hill.

== Geography ==
The hill is situated about 3049 feet from mean sea level and 200 feet from the above the ground level and is situated in the northwest entrance of the town. A vast expanse of granite rock, scattered large and small boulders can be found en route to the peak.

== Monuments ==
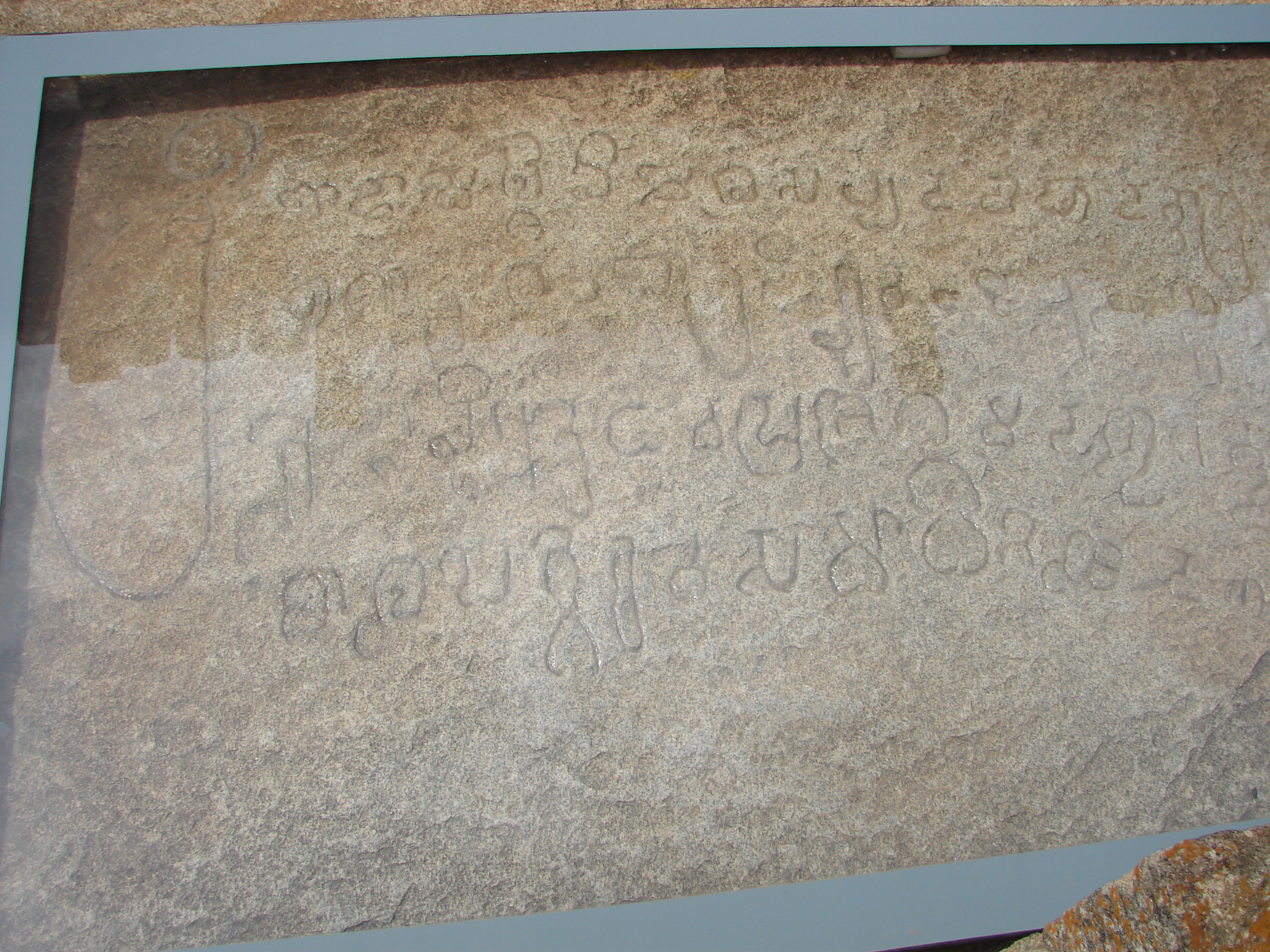
8th century Old Kannada inscription on Chandragiri hill, Shravanabelagola

A number of Jain basadis are found on the Hill. Some of the prominent ones are:

- Chavundaraya Basadi
- Chandragupta Basadi
- Shantinatha Basadi
- Parshvanatha Basadi
- Kattale Basadi
- Majjigana Basadi
- Shasana Basadi
- Chandraprabha Basadi
- Parshwanatha Basadi II
- Eradukatte Basadi
- Savatigandhavarana Basadi
- Terina Basadi
- Shantishwara Basadi
- Iruve-Brahmadeva Basadi

Apart from these a number of other monuments such as Bhadrabahu Cave, Marasimha's Manastambha, Mahanavami Mantapa, Bhadrabahu Inscriptions, Gangaraja Mantap and Nishidhi Mantaps can be found on Chandragiri.

An idol of Bharata, Bahubali's older brother, carved from soapstone can be found here. The statue is damaged below the thighs. It bears a striking resemblance to that of the Bahubali statue on the Vindhyagiri Hills.

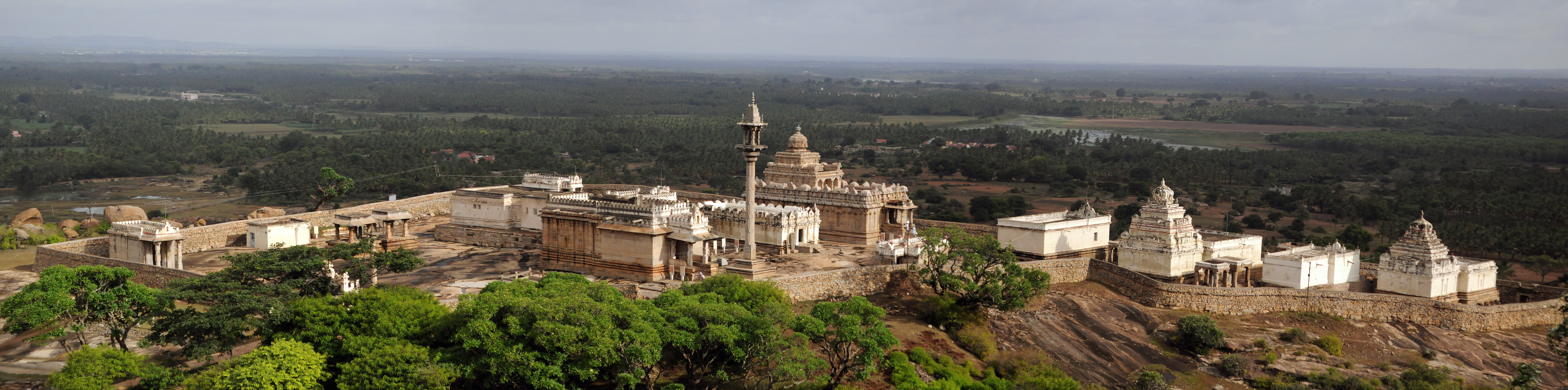
Chandragiri temple complex at dawn.

== Gallery ==
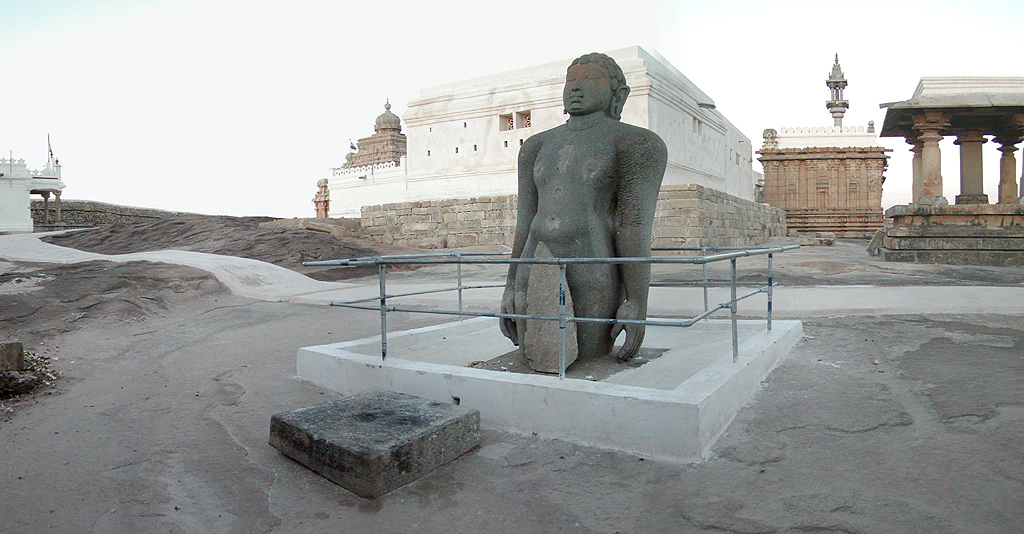
Bharatha Statue on Chandragiri hill

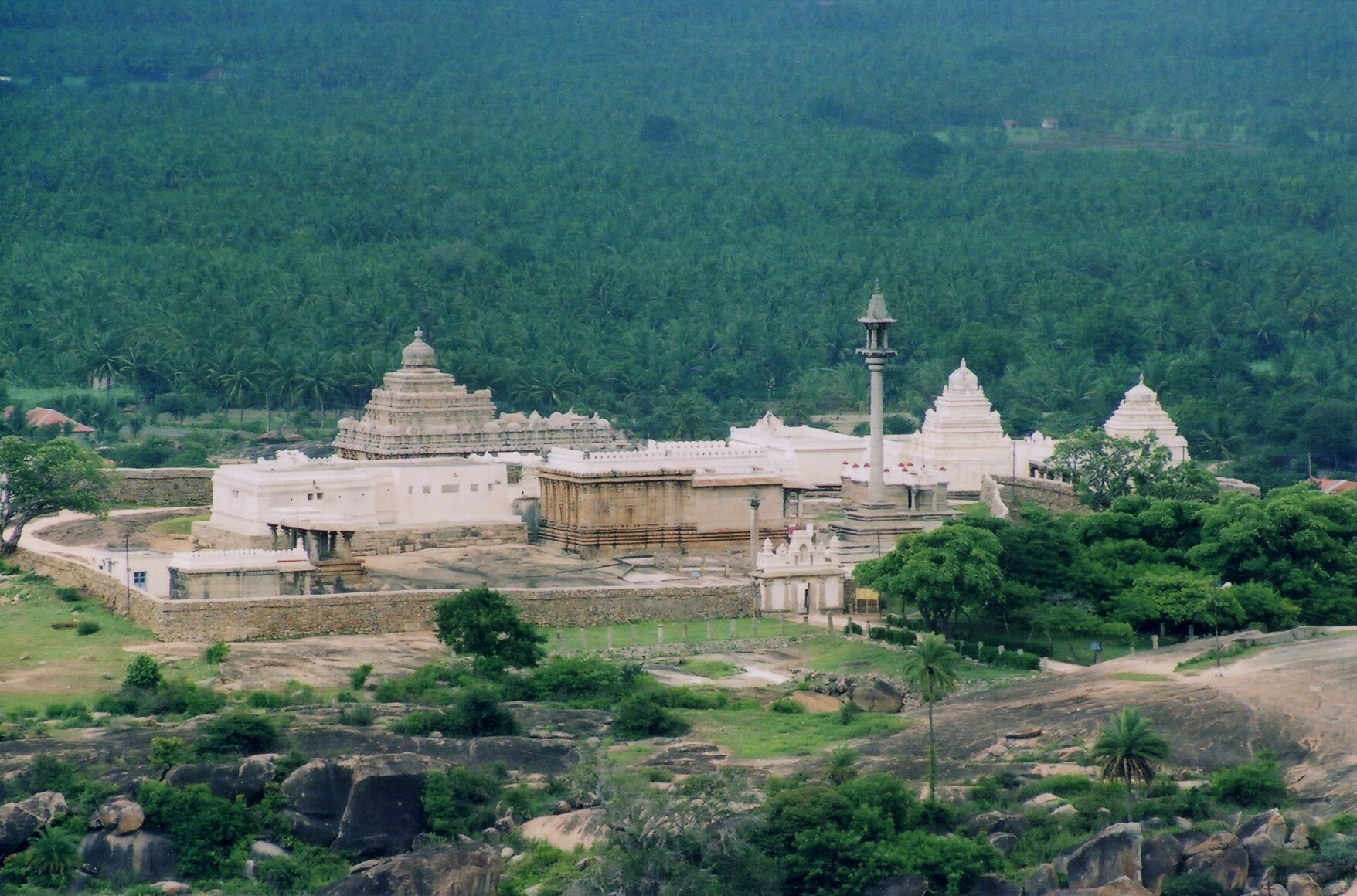
Chandragiri hill temple complex

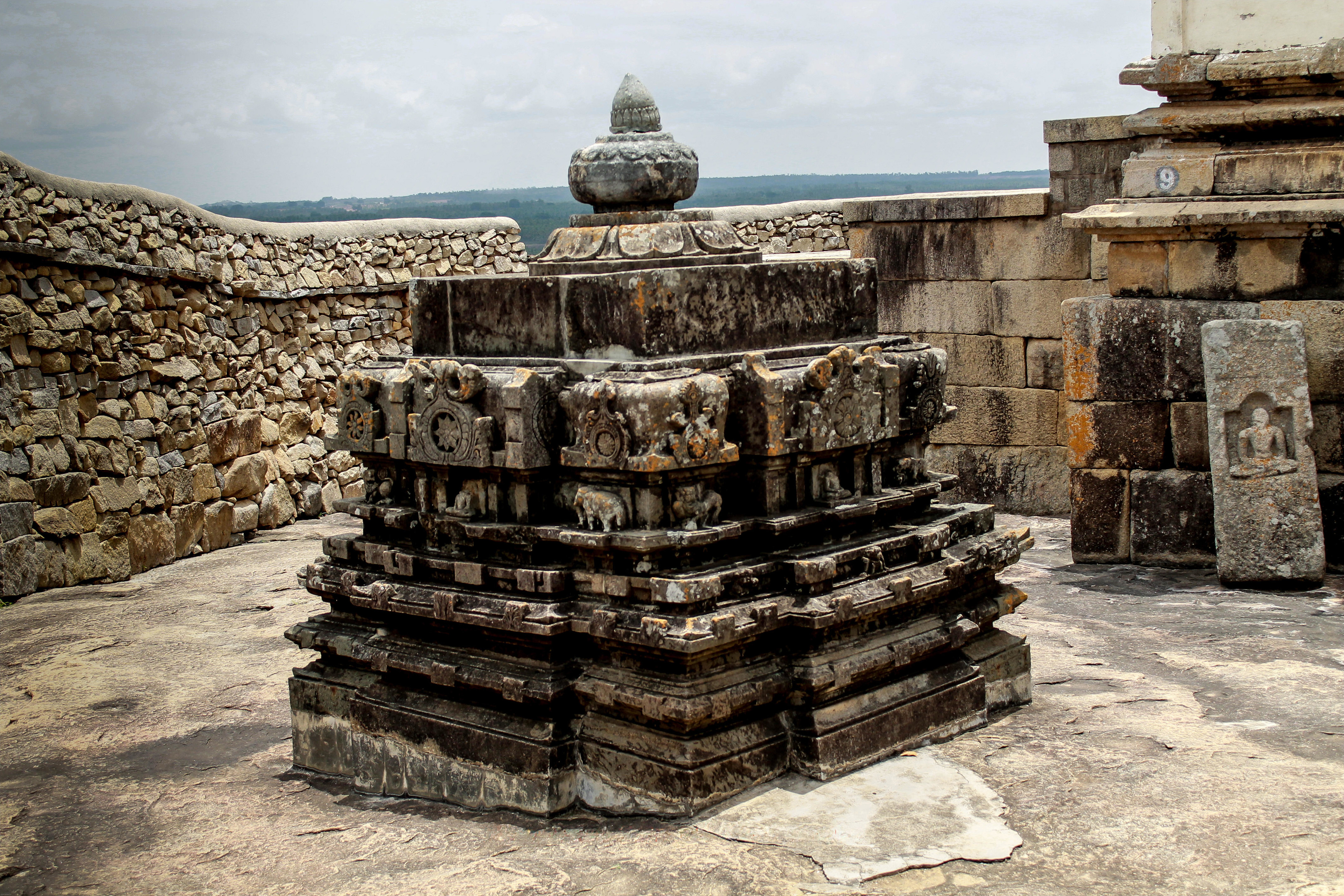
Image from one of the Basadis at Chandragiri

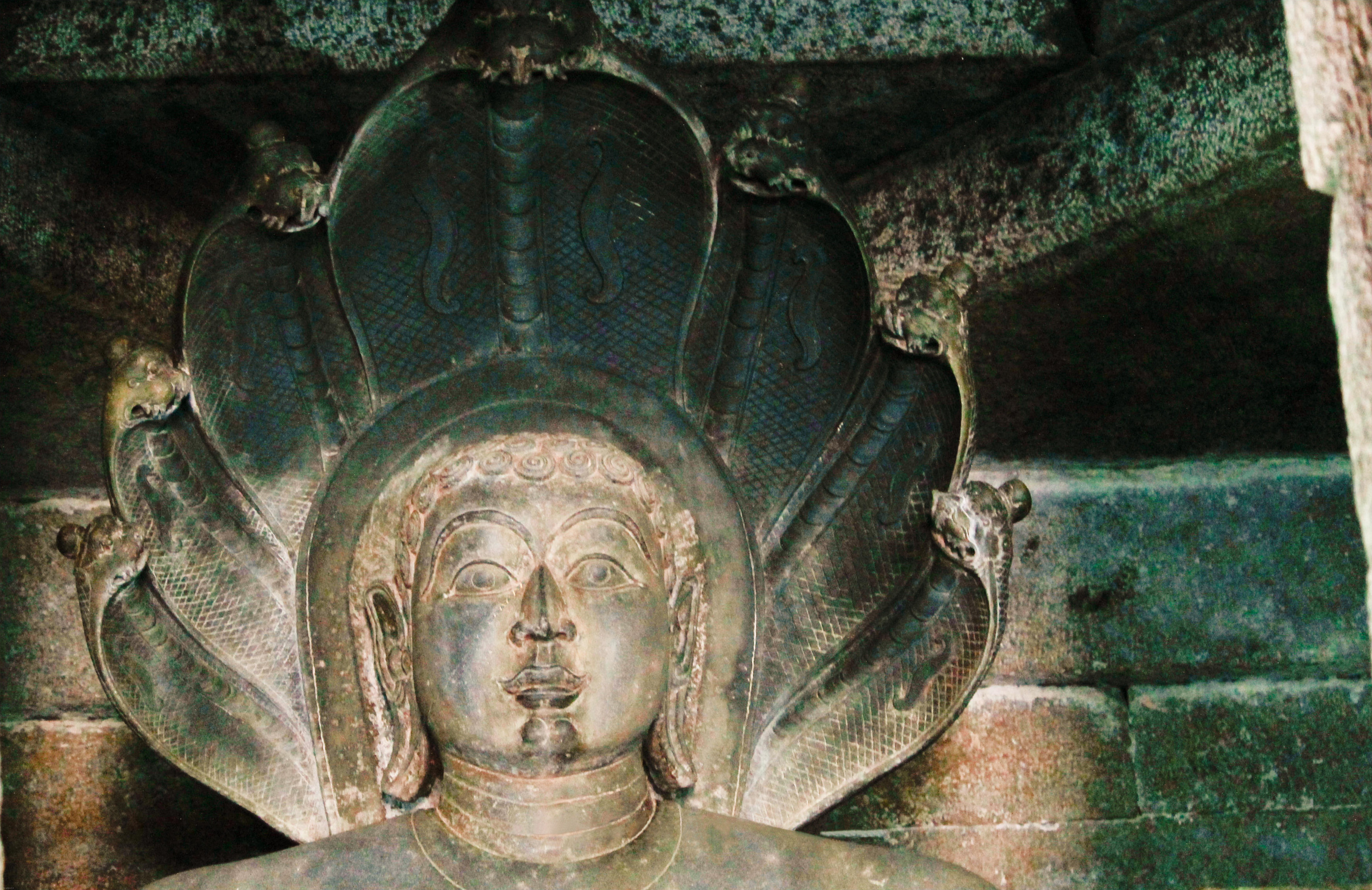
Idol of Parshvanatha on Chandragiri

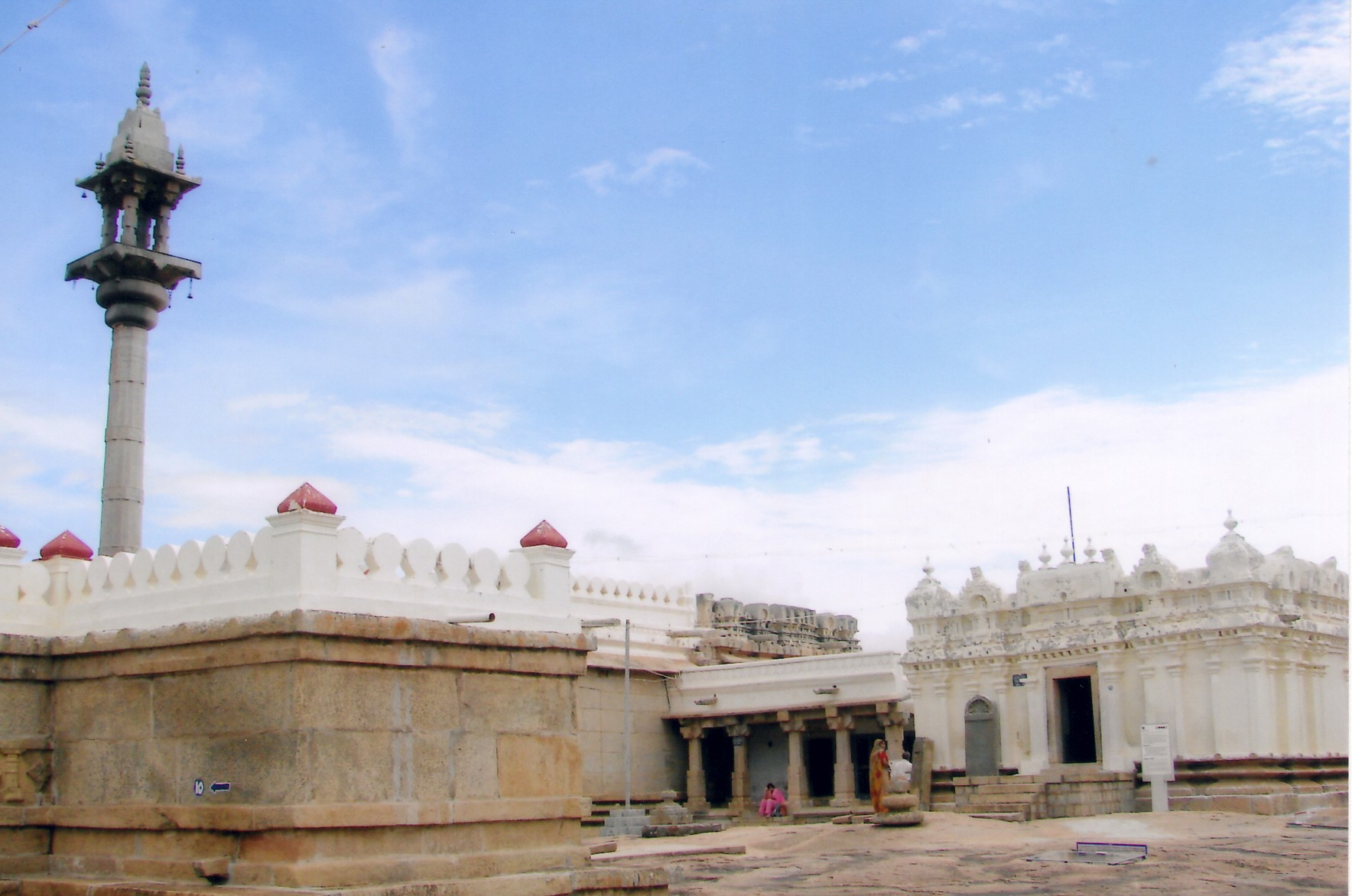
Chandragupta Basadi

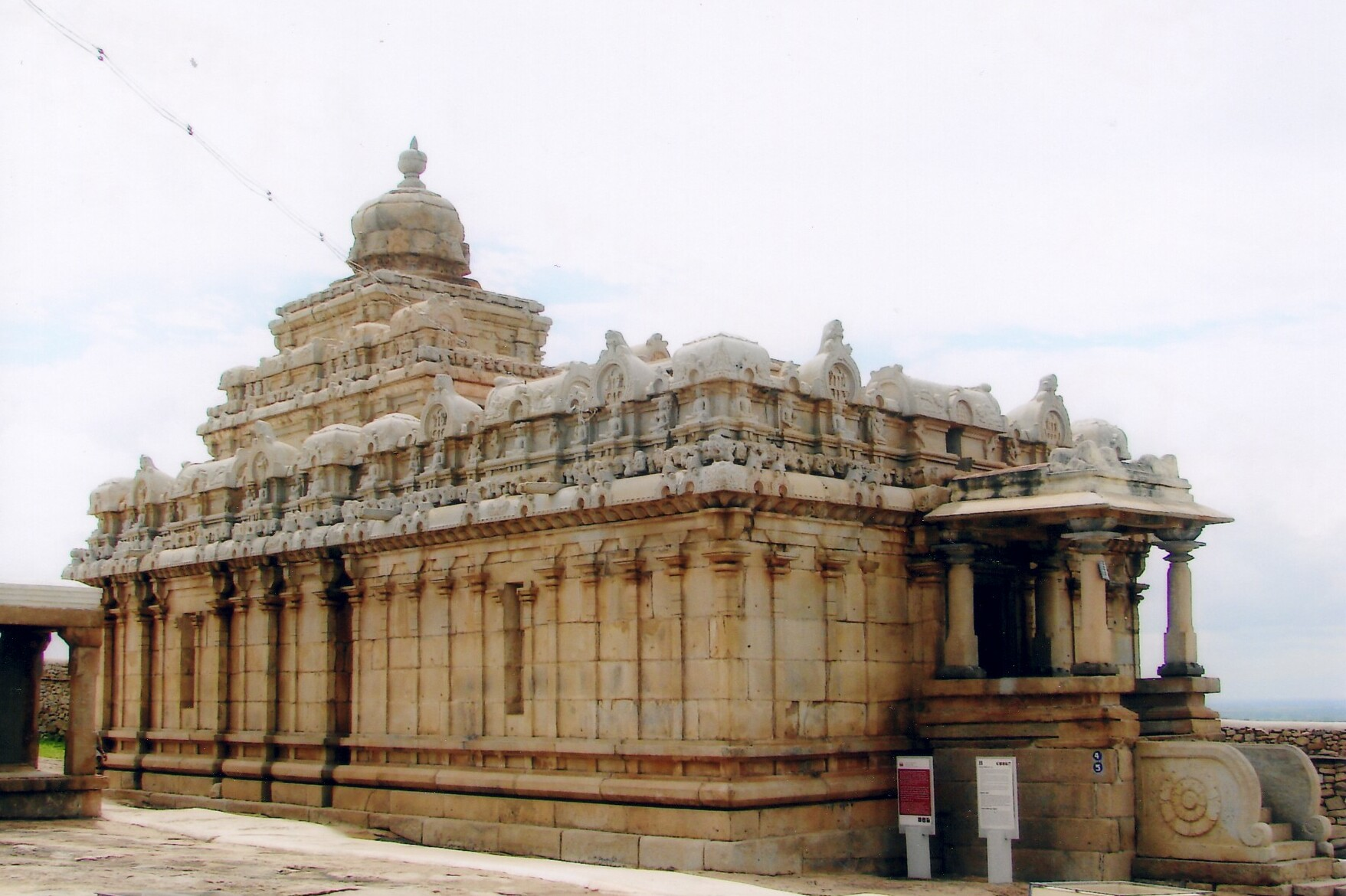
Chavundaraya Basadi

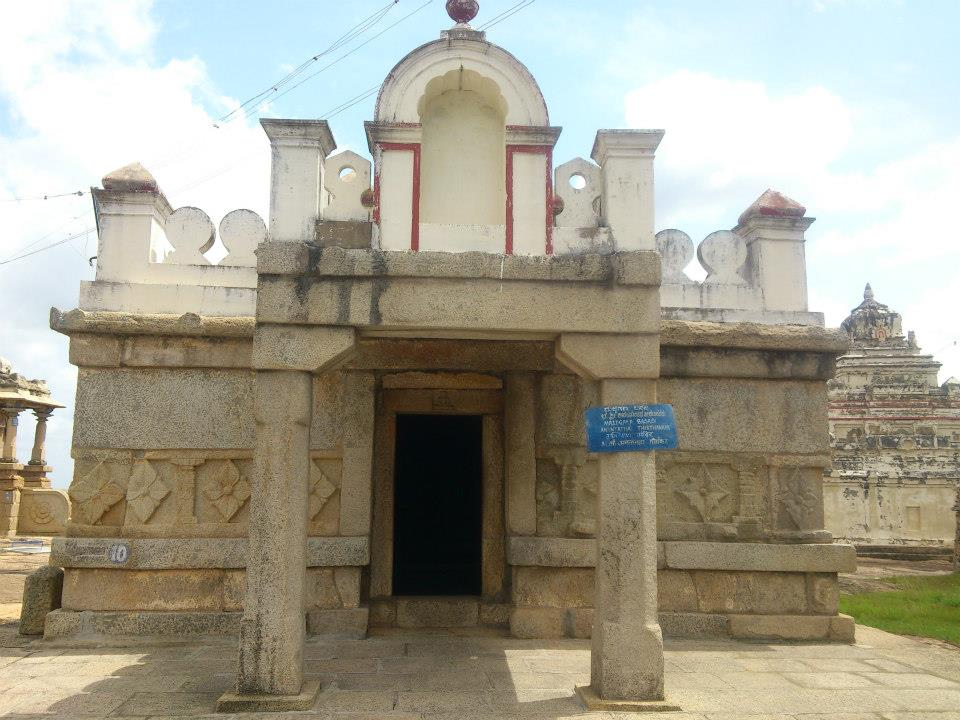
Majjigana basti

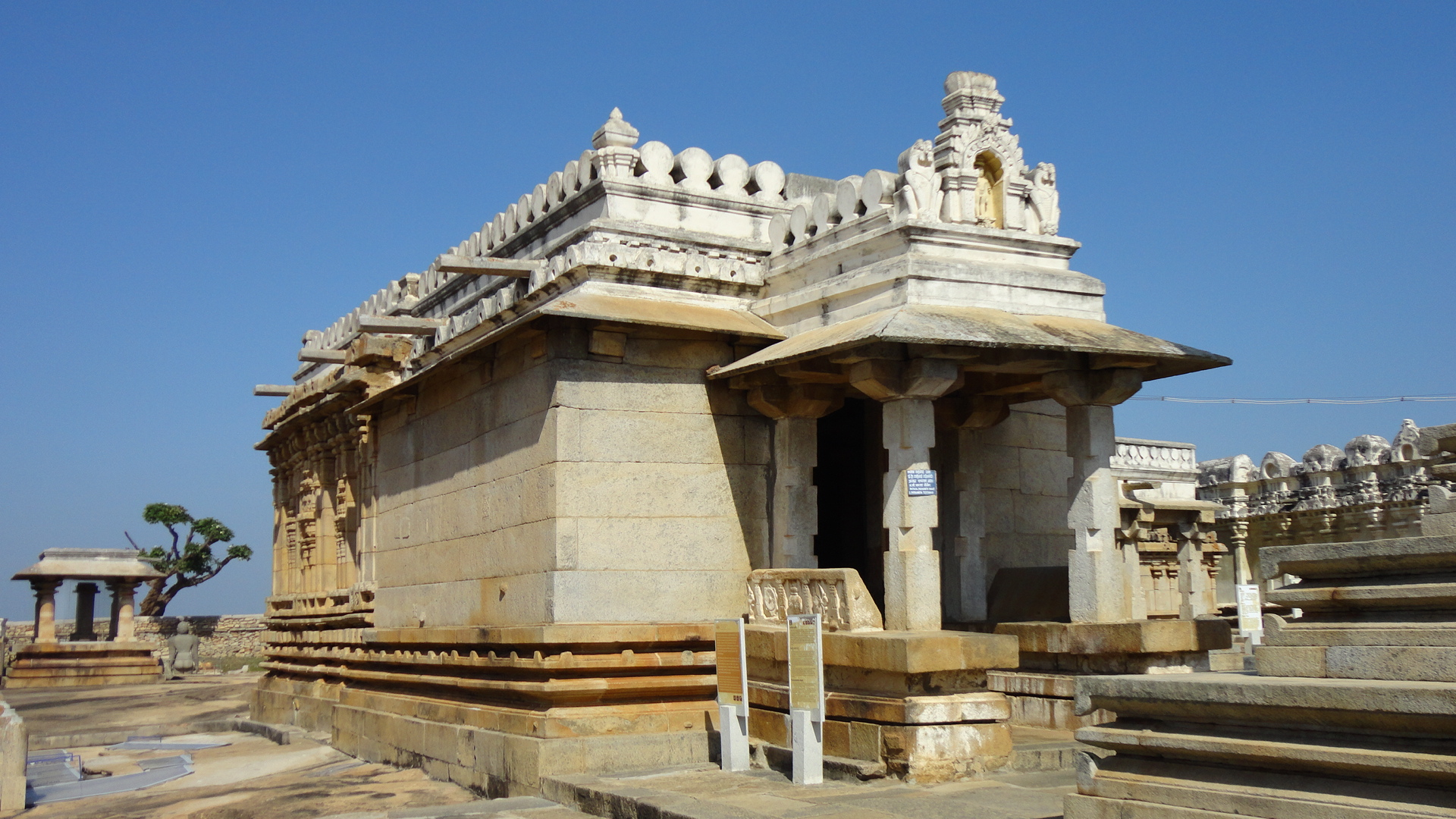
Parsvanatha Basadi

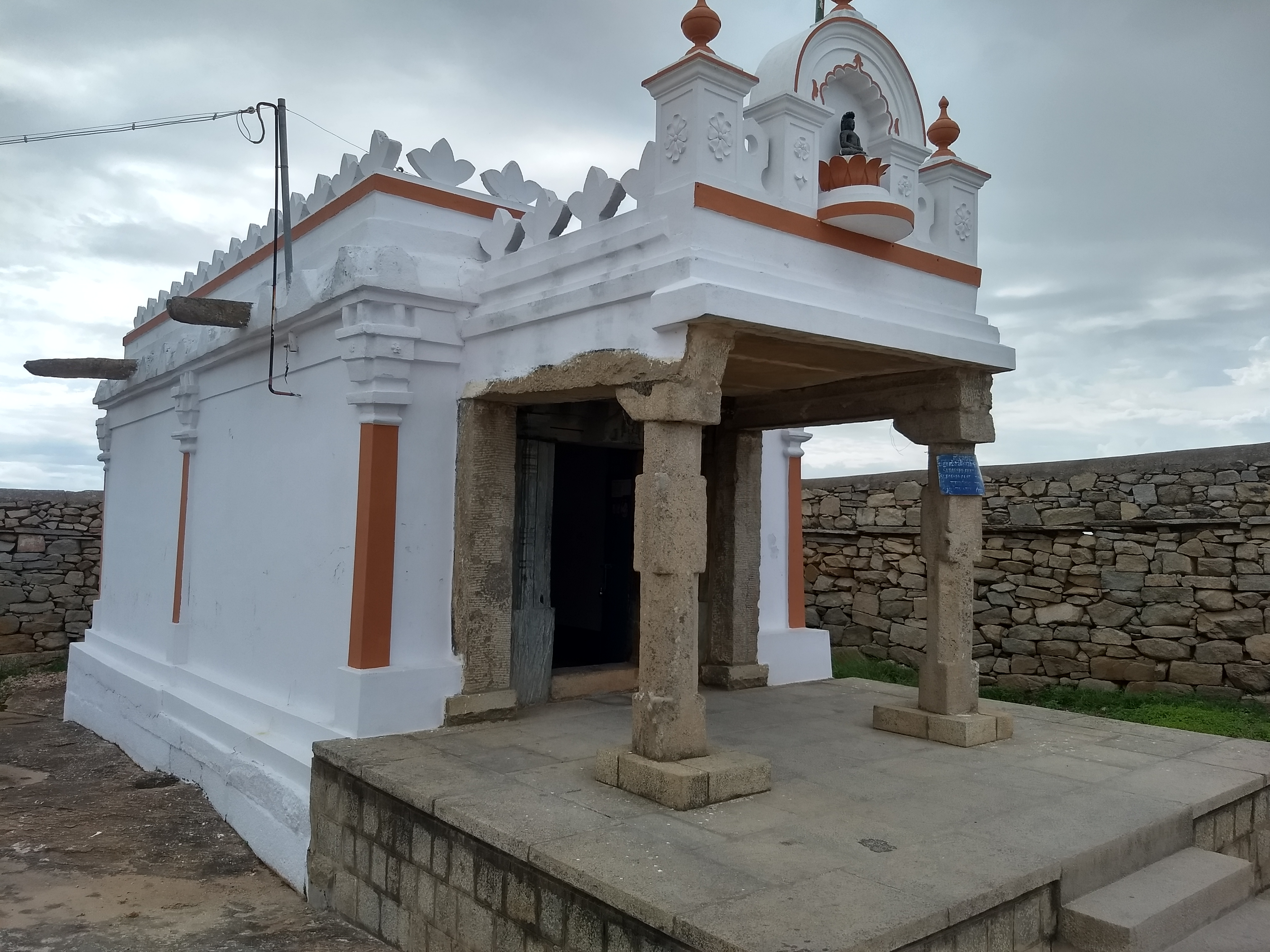
Suparshvanatha Basadi

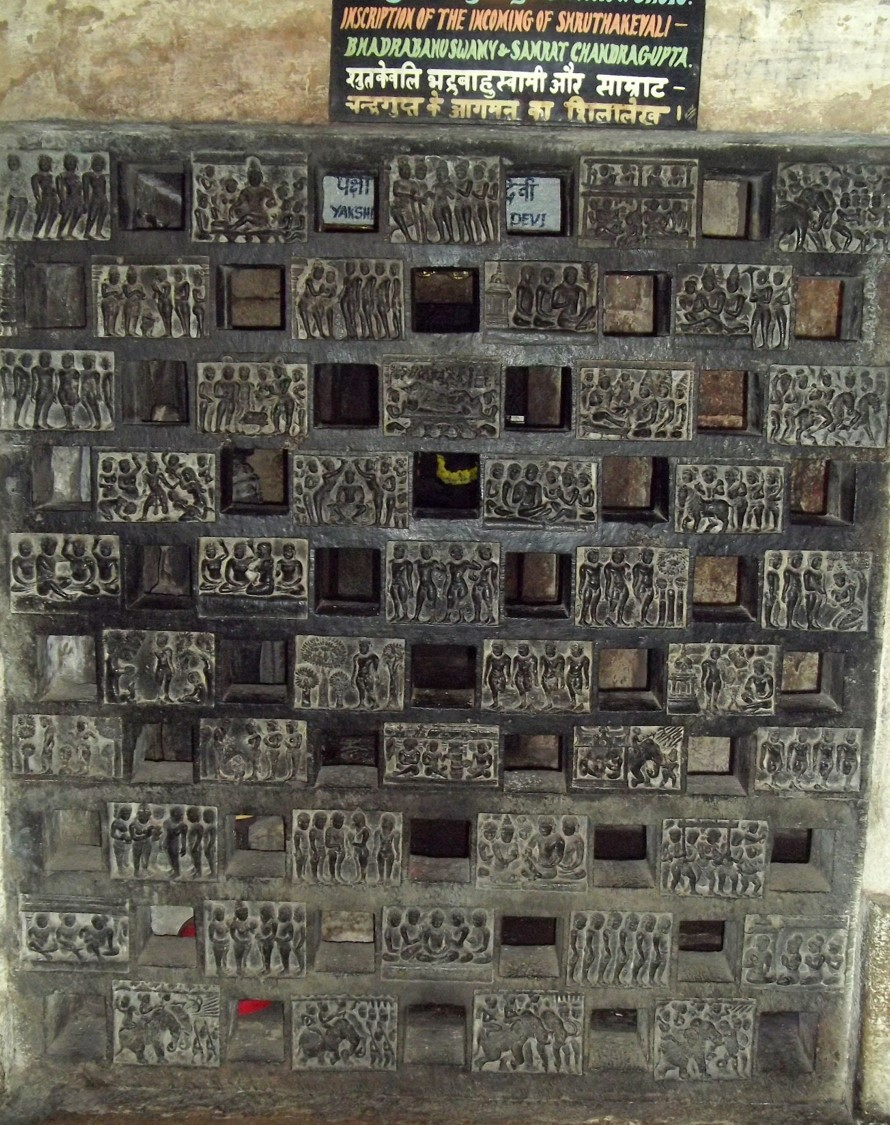
Jain Inscription

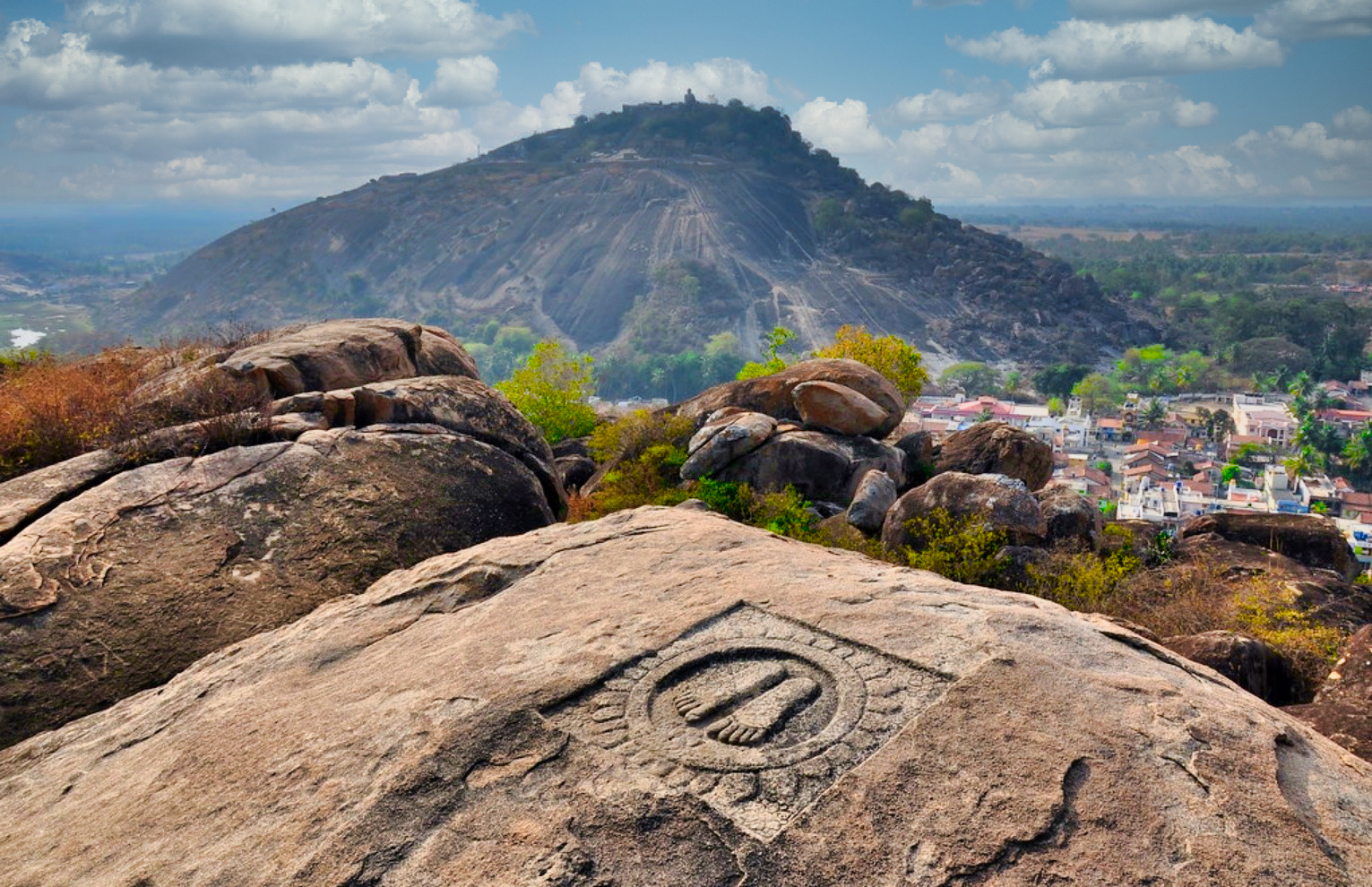
The Footprints of Chandragupta Maurya on Chandragiri hill Hill, where Chandragupta (the unifier of India and founder of the Maurya Dynasty) performed Sallekhana.
