= Chandragupta basadi =

Jain temple in Shravanabelagola, India

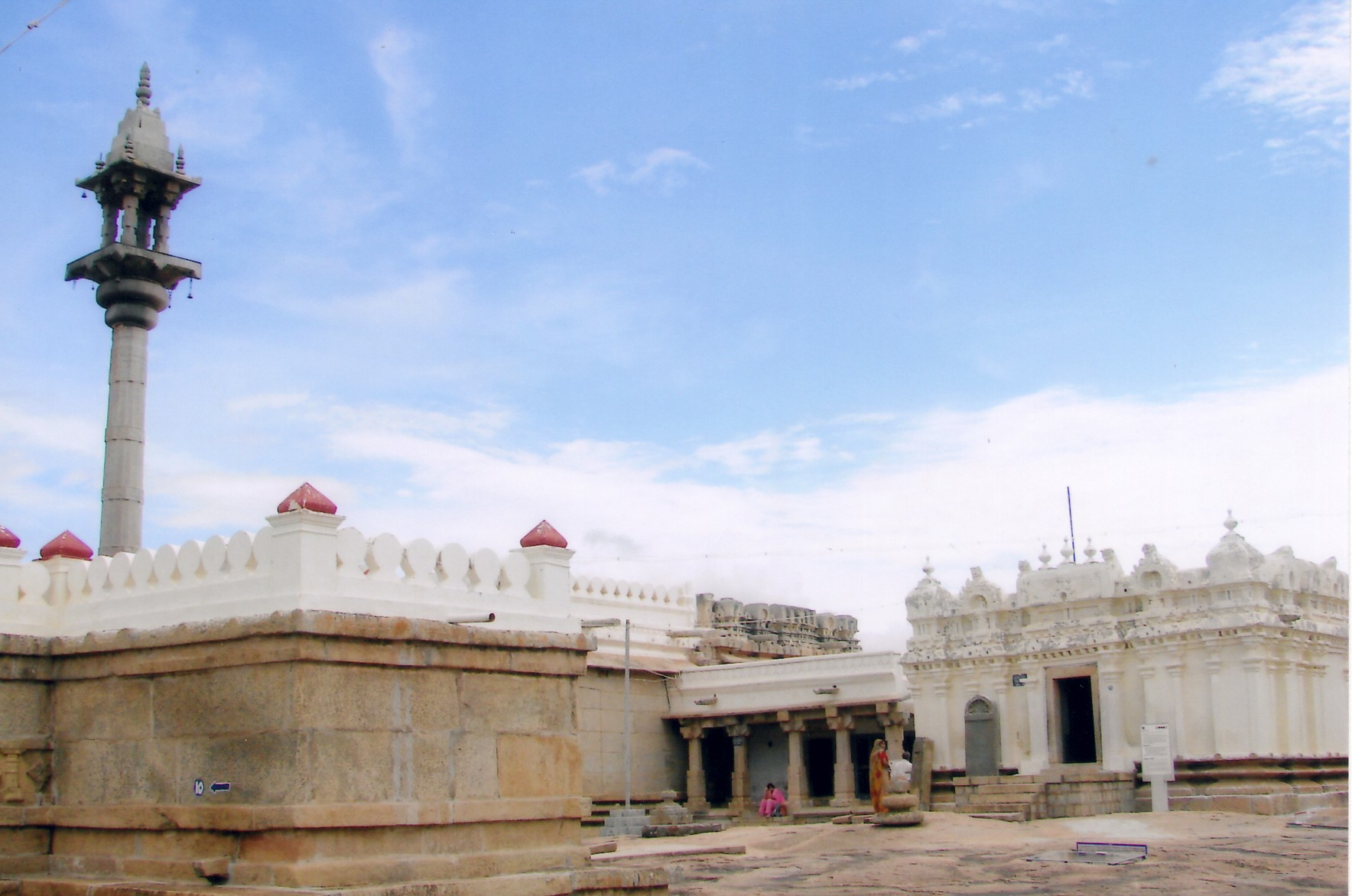
- Chandragupta basadi at Shravanabelagola

Religion
- Affiliation: Jainism
- Deity: Parshvanatha
- Festival: Mahavir Jayanti
- Governing body: Shri Shravana Belgola Jain Matha
- Bhattaraka: Karmayogi Swasti Shri Charukirti Bhattaraka Pattacharya Swami

Location
- Location: Shravana Belgola, Hassan, Karnataka
- Interactive map of Chandragupta basadi
- Coordinates: 12°51′42.19″N 76°29′12.38″E

Architecture
- Established: 9th-10th century AD

Chandragupta basadi (Kannada: ಚಂದ್ರಗುಪ್ತ ಬಸದಿ) is one of the smaller basadis (Jain temples) located on the Chandragiri Hill in Sravanabelagola in the Indian state of Karnataka. Archaeological Survey of India has listed the Chandragupta basadi in group of monuments in Shravanabelagola as Adarsh Smarak Monument.

== Architecture ==
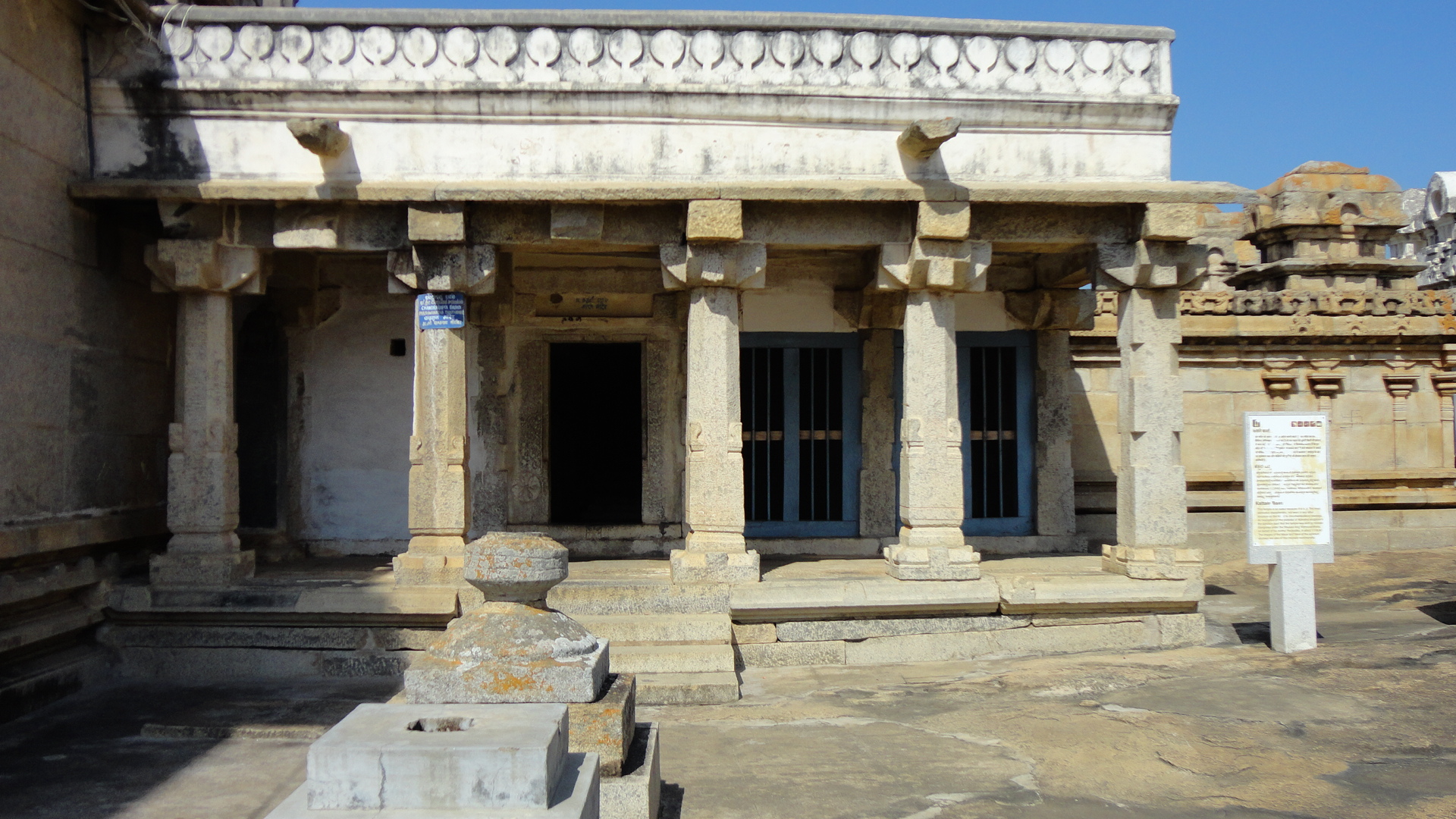
Frontal Entrance to Chandragupta Basadi

The basadi originally consisted of three cells standing in a line and opening into a narrow passage. The basadi is south facing and the cells on either side have small towers over them resembling the chole type. Subsequently, an ornamental doorway has been added in front with perforated stone screens at the sides. The screens are pierced with square openings are carved with minute sculptures, interpreted, in the light of Jaina tradition, as the scenes from the lives of the Srutakevali, Bhadrabahu and Chandragupta Maurya.

Some irregularity is observed in the alternate rows of the eastern screens owing to some misplacement. By replacing the topmost stone at the bottom and the bottom one at the top the rows regularity correspond with those of the western screen. The middle cell of this temple has the figure of Parshvanatha, the one to the right the figure of Padmavathi and the one to the left the figure of Kushmandini, all in a seated posture. In the verandah there are standing figures of Dharanendra yaksha at the right end and Sarvahna yaksha at the left. The temple opens into the front hall which also forms the entrance to the Kattale basadi. In this hall stands a figure of Kshetrapala opposite to the middle cell of the Chandragupta basadi. The outer walls are decorated with pilasters, friezes, niches, the heads and trunks of lions mostly in pairs facing each other. Tradition says that this temple was caused to be erected by the Maurya emperor Chandragupta. The label dasoja occurring on one of the screens is undoubtedly the name of the sculptor who made the screens and the doorway. He is very probably identical with the sculptor who carved some of the fine bracket images of the Chennakesava temple at Belur and therefore the period of the screens and the doorway would be about the middle of the 12th century A.D. The other parts of the building are some of the oldest on the hill, probably going back to the ninth or tenth century A.D.

== See also ==
- Jainism in Karnataka
- Bhandara Basadi
