= Jainism in Karnataka =

Religion of Jainism in the Indian state of Karnataka

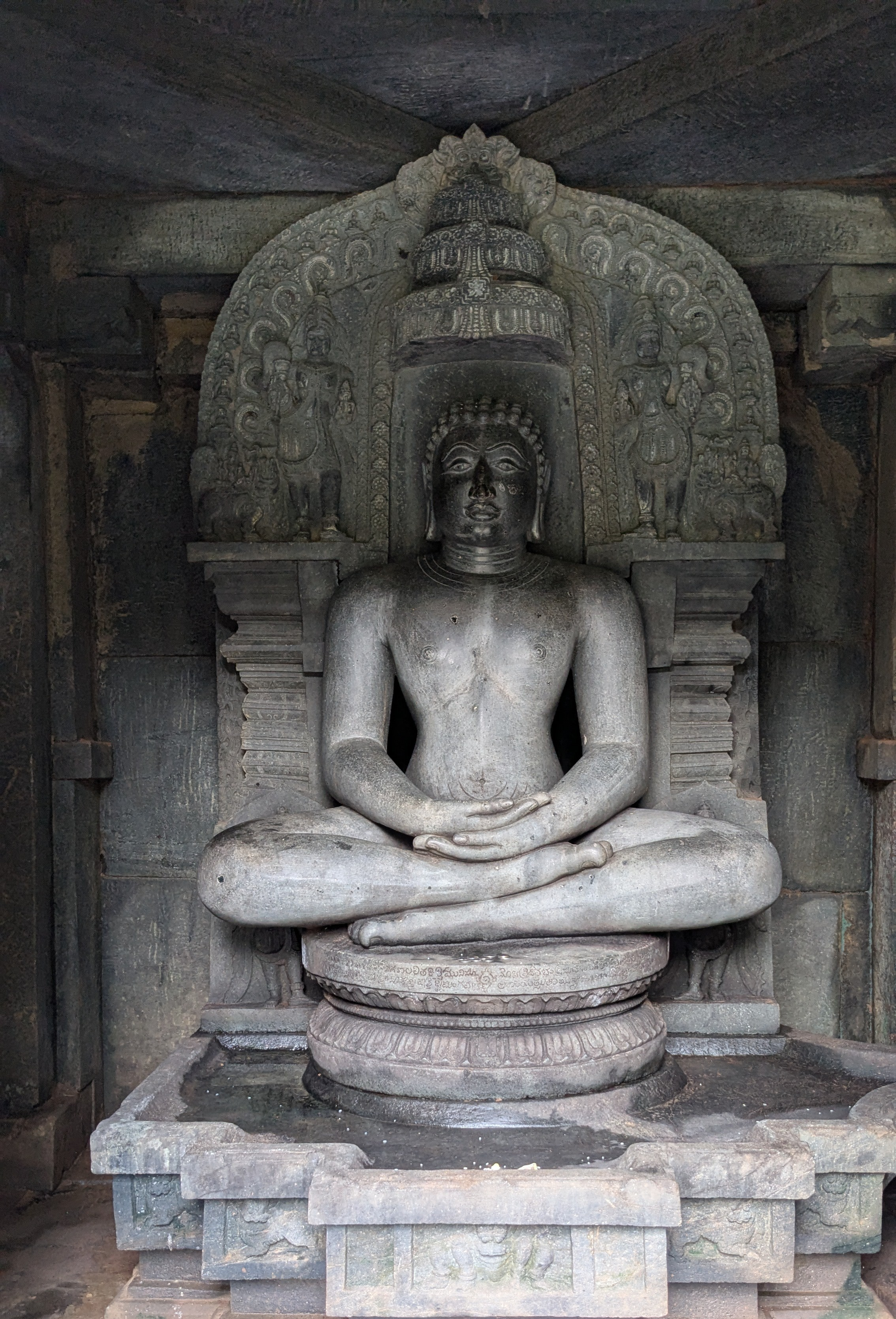
Idol of Bhagwan Neminath at Ancient Jain Basadi, Gerusoppa, Karnataka

Karnataka, a state in South India has a long association with Jainism, a religion which enjoyed patronage of major historic kingdoms in the state such as the Rastrakuta Dynasty, Western Ganga, Kadamba and Chalukya dynasties and the Hoysala Empire. Today the state is home to a number of Jain monuments, such as temples, Gommata statues and stambhas.

== History ==
Historical association of Jainism with Karnataka dates back to the 3rd century BC. Acharya Bhadrabahu predicted a twelve-year-long famine in north India and led the migration of Jain sangha to the south. He was accompanied by his disciple Chandragupta Maurya and the Sangha halted at Chandragiri Hill. Realising that he was nearing the end of his life, Bhadrabahu instructed his disciples to spread the religion and he undertook sallekhana at Chandragiri. However, this account has little authenticity due to the contradiction it offers to Darshansaar, an earlier Digambara text. Two major texts – 10th century CE text Darshansaar by Devasena, a Digambara ascetic, and 14th century CE text Bhadrabahu-charitra by Ratnanandi, also a Digambara ascetic, have completely different accounts of how the Śvētāmbara sect was created. While the previous story mentions that the Śvētāmbara sect was created in 298 BCE by Sthulabhadra, the former text mentions that it was created in Vallabhi 136 years after Vikramaditya's death and by a monk named Jinacandra. Not only the time periods, but also the location of the sect's creation and installation, as well as the name of the originator differs in both these records.

Chandragupta Maurya apparently continued to live on this hill worshipping the foot prints of his teacher and later he too took Sallekhana. There are two monuments on the hill recalling this event, a rock cut cave called Bhadrabahu cave and a structural shrine called the Chandragupta Basadi.

== Architecture and monuments ==
There are a number of monuments relating to the Jain religion in Karnataka. The Jain monuments include smaller shrines, Jain temples (known as Bastis or Basadis), Gommata statues and Sthambas (pillars). Moodabidri is home to the 1000 Pillar Jain temple. The Ganga-Permadi temple at Annigeri in Navalgund taluq received donation of land from mahasamanta Katarsa in 1074 CE for maintenance of charity-houses. Another temple named Samyakratnakara basadi situated at Mugad, Dharwad district received a similar donation some time before 11th century CE.

The most prominent among them are as follows:

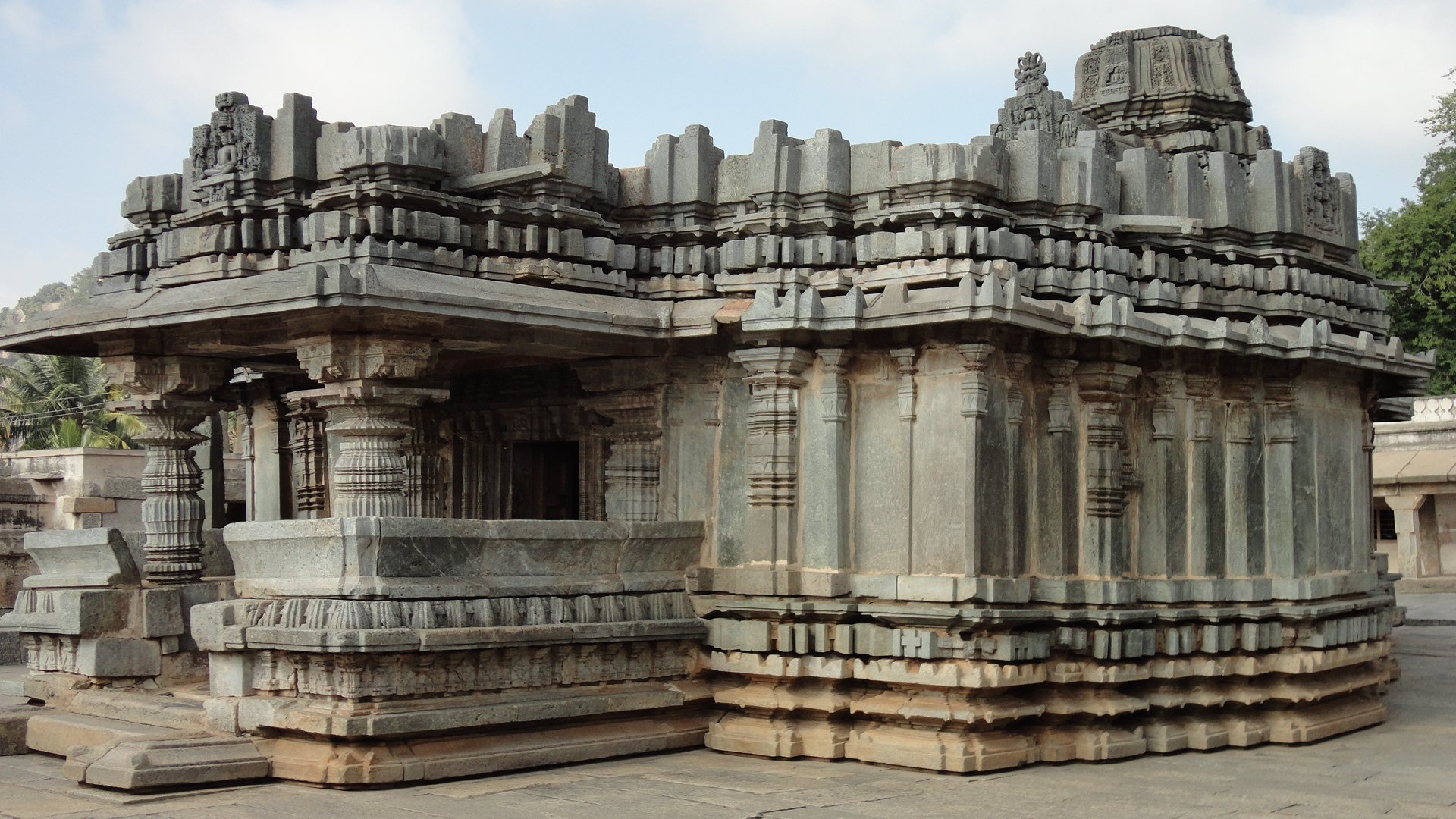
Akkana Basadi, Shravanabelagola

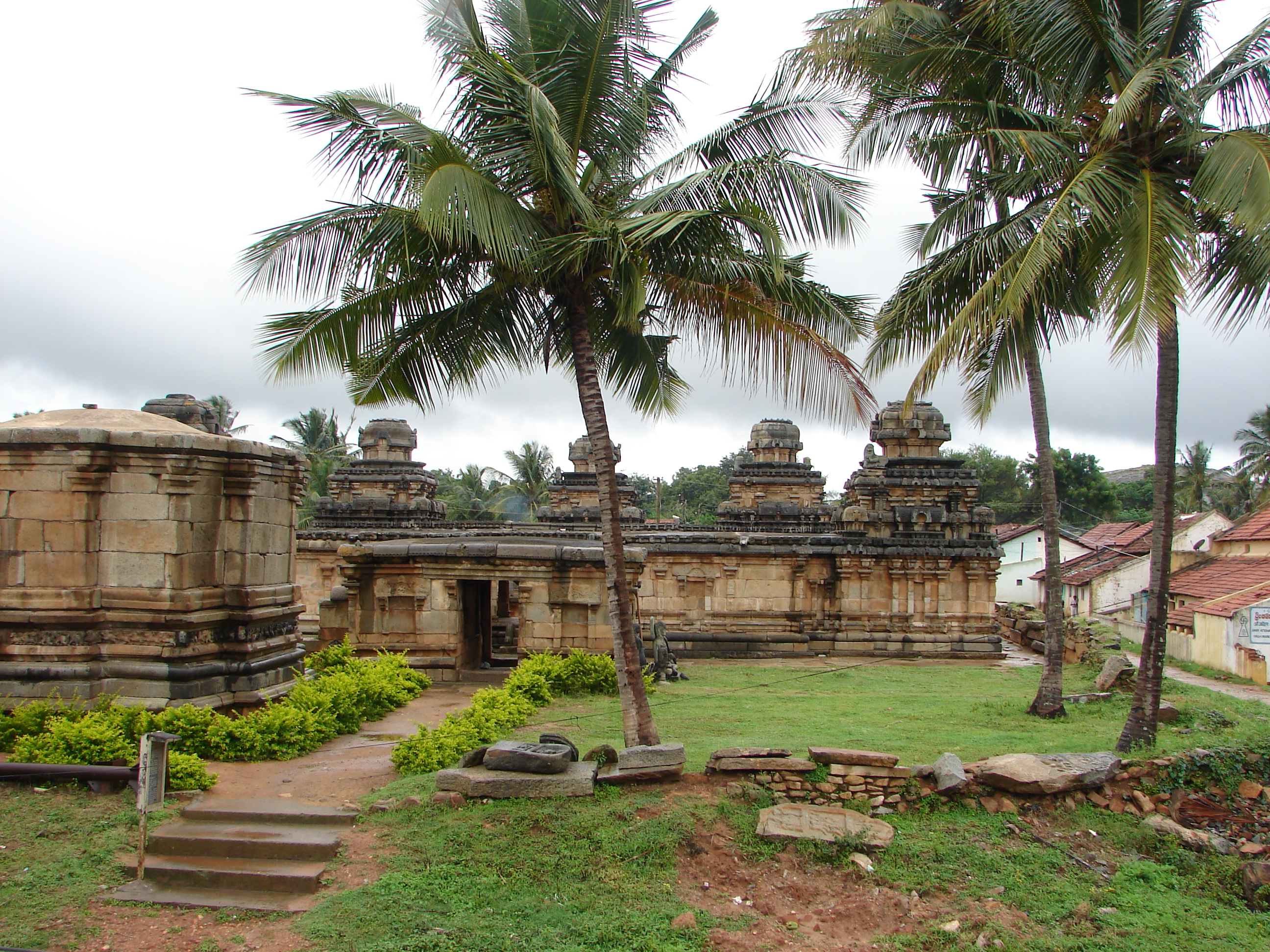
Panchakuta Basadi

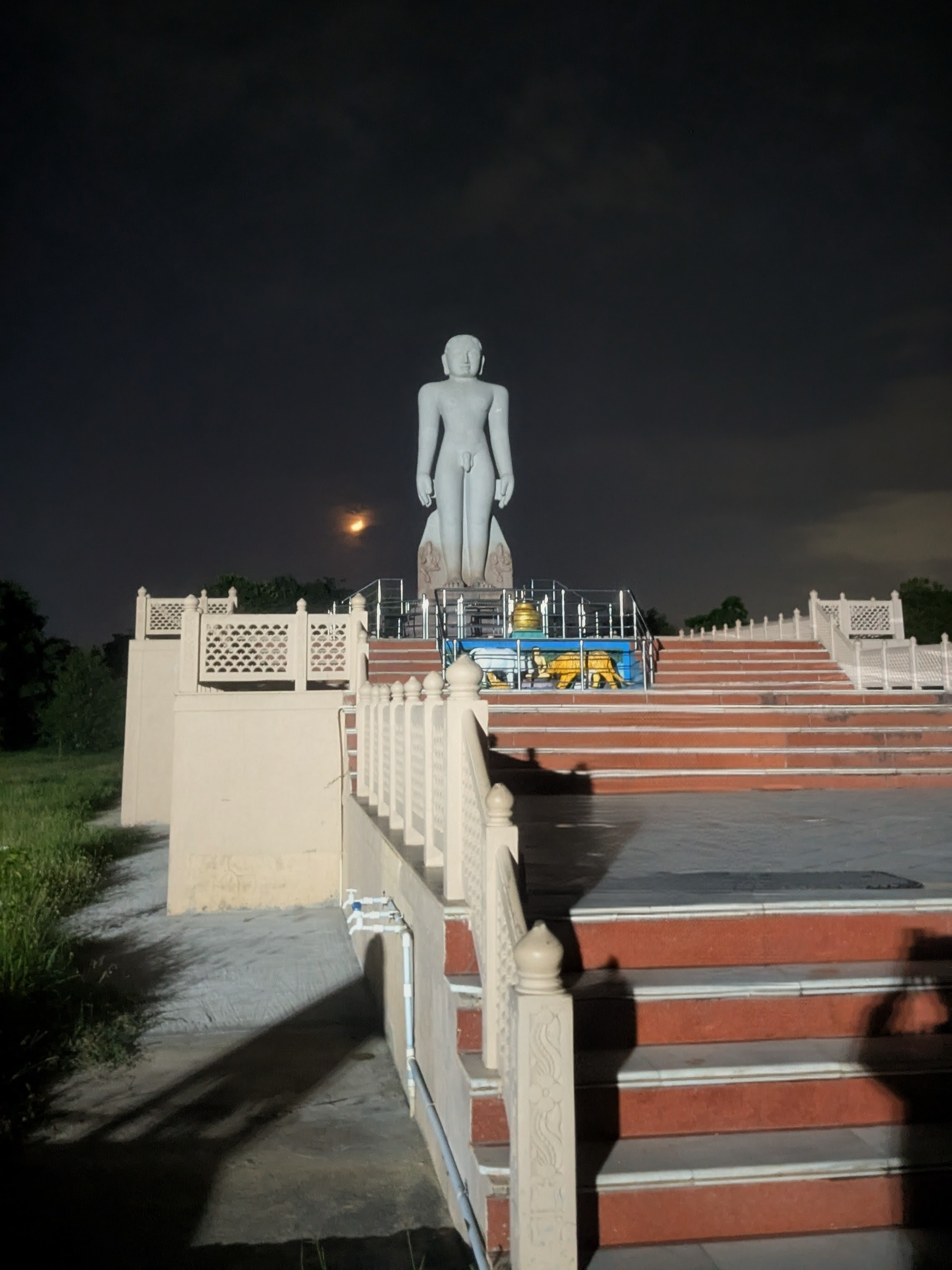
Bhagwan Chandraprabha at Mandaragiri, Karnataka

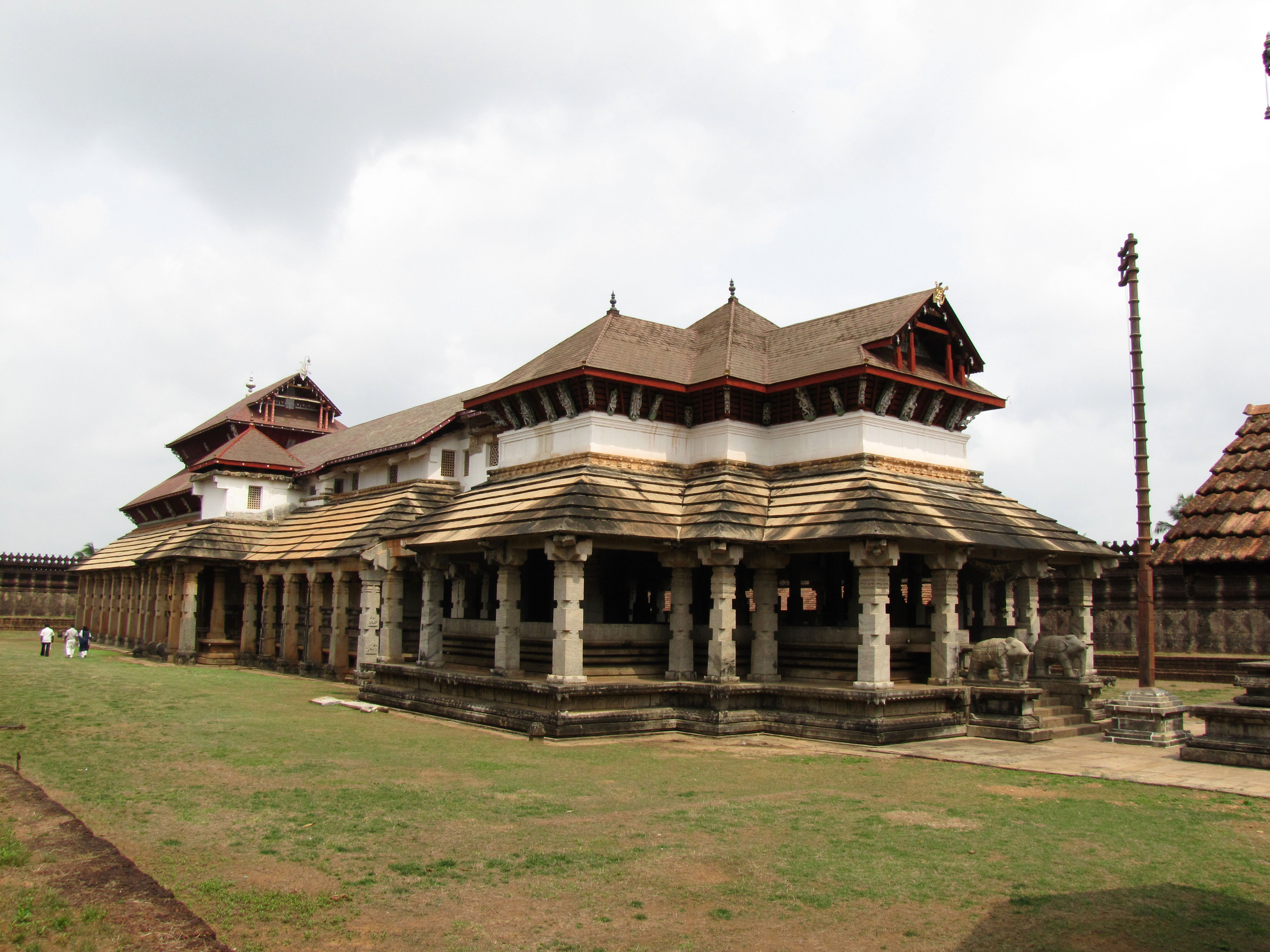
Saavira Kambada Basadi, the 1000 pillar Jain temple at Moodabidri

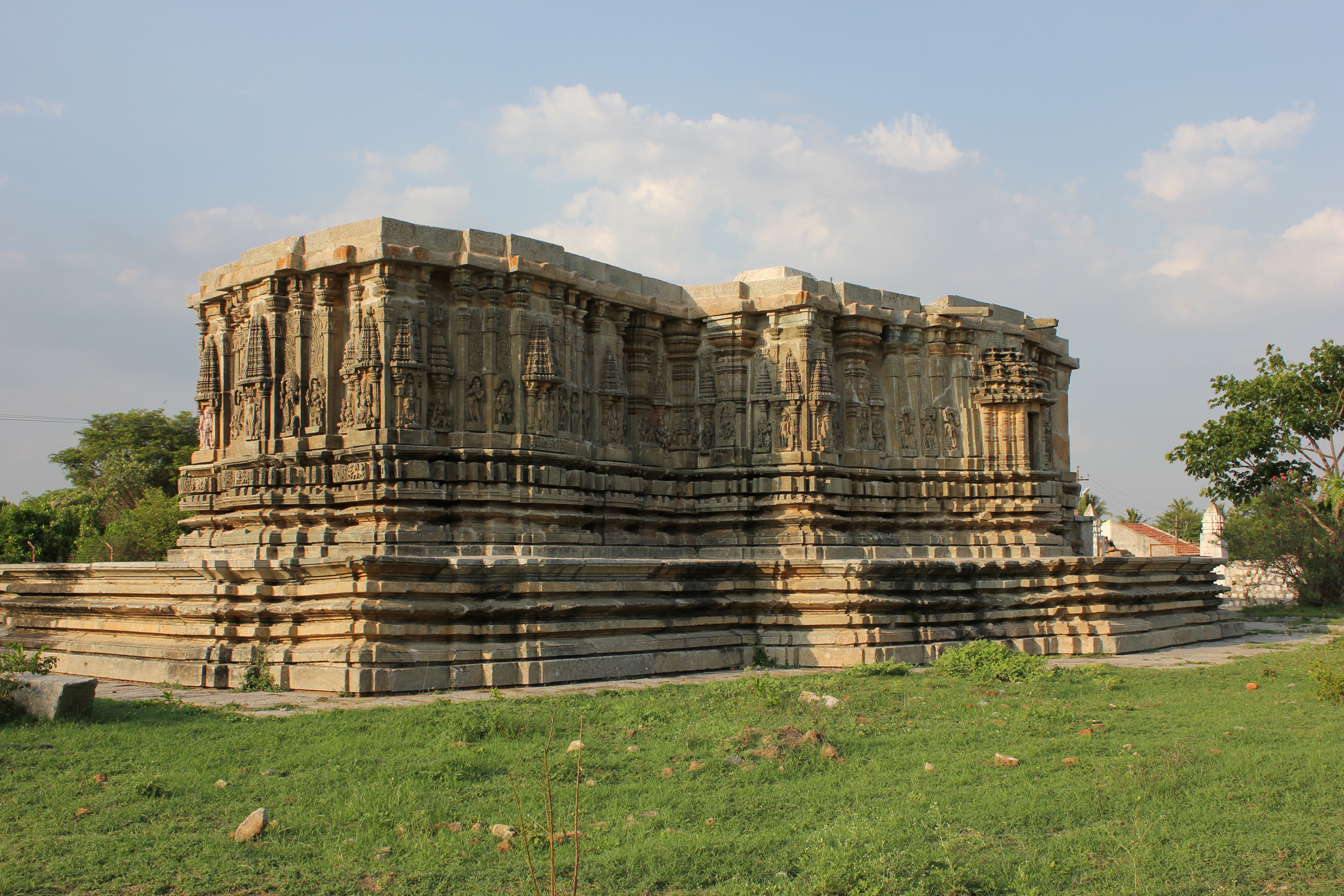
Shantinatha Basadi, Jinanathapura

=== Basadis (Bastis) ===
- Shravanabelagola
  - Chandragiri: Chandragupta Basadi, Chamundaraya Basadi, Parshvanatha basadi
  - Vindhyagiri (Vindyagiri): Odegal Basadi
  - Town: Akkana Basadi, Bhandara Basadi and Jain Matha
- Moodabidri- Also known as "Jain Kashi"
  - Saavira Kambada Basadi - The 1000 pillar Jain temple
  - Guru Basadi
  - There are 18 other Basadis in and around Moodabidiri.
- Halebidu
  - Basadi complex, Halebidu - 3 Basadis
- Karkala and Gerusoppa
  - Chaturmukha Basadi
- Belgaum
  - Kamal Basadi
- Lakshmeshwara
  - Shanka Basadi
- Varanga
  - Kere Basadi
- Shantinatha Basadi, Jinanathapura
- Panchakuta Basadi, Kambadahalli
- Chaturmukha Basadi, Gerusoppa
- Chandranatha Basadi, Hadavalli
- Parshvanatha Basadi, Gundwad

=== Statues of Gommata ===
Shravanabelagola has the world famous monolithic statue, Gommateshwara statue. Similar Monolithic statues of Lord Bahubali can be also seen in Venur, Dharmasthala, Karkala and Mysore.

There are five monolithic statues of Bahubali in Karnataka measuring more than 20 feet in height.

- 57 feet at Shravanabelagola in Hassan District in 981 CE
- 42 feet at Karkala in Udupi District in 1432 CE
- 39 feet at Dharmasthala in Dakshina Kannada District in 1973 CE
- 35 feet at Venur in Dakshina Kannada District in 1604 CE
- 20 feet at Gommatagiri in Mysore District in 12th Century CE

In all of the above-mentioned places, the holy festival of Mahamastakabhisheka is held once every 12 years when the statue of Bahubali is worshiped and bathed in holy water, milk, turmeric, and other natural herbs that have their own significant importance.

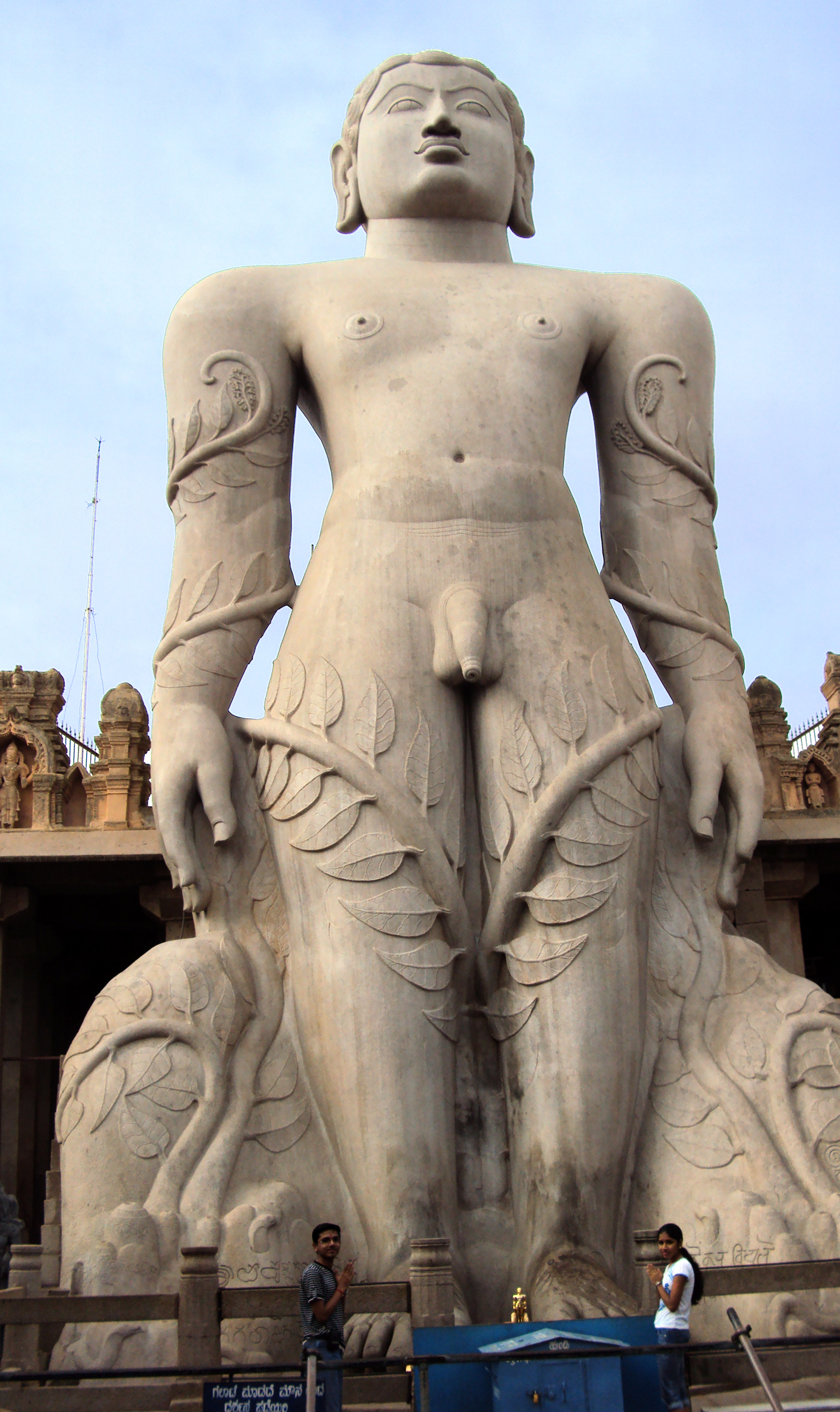
Gommateshwara statue at Shravanabelagola, 978-993 AD

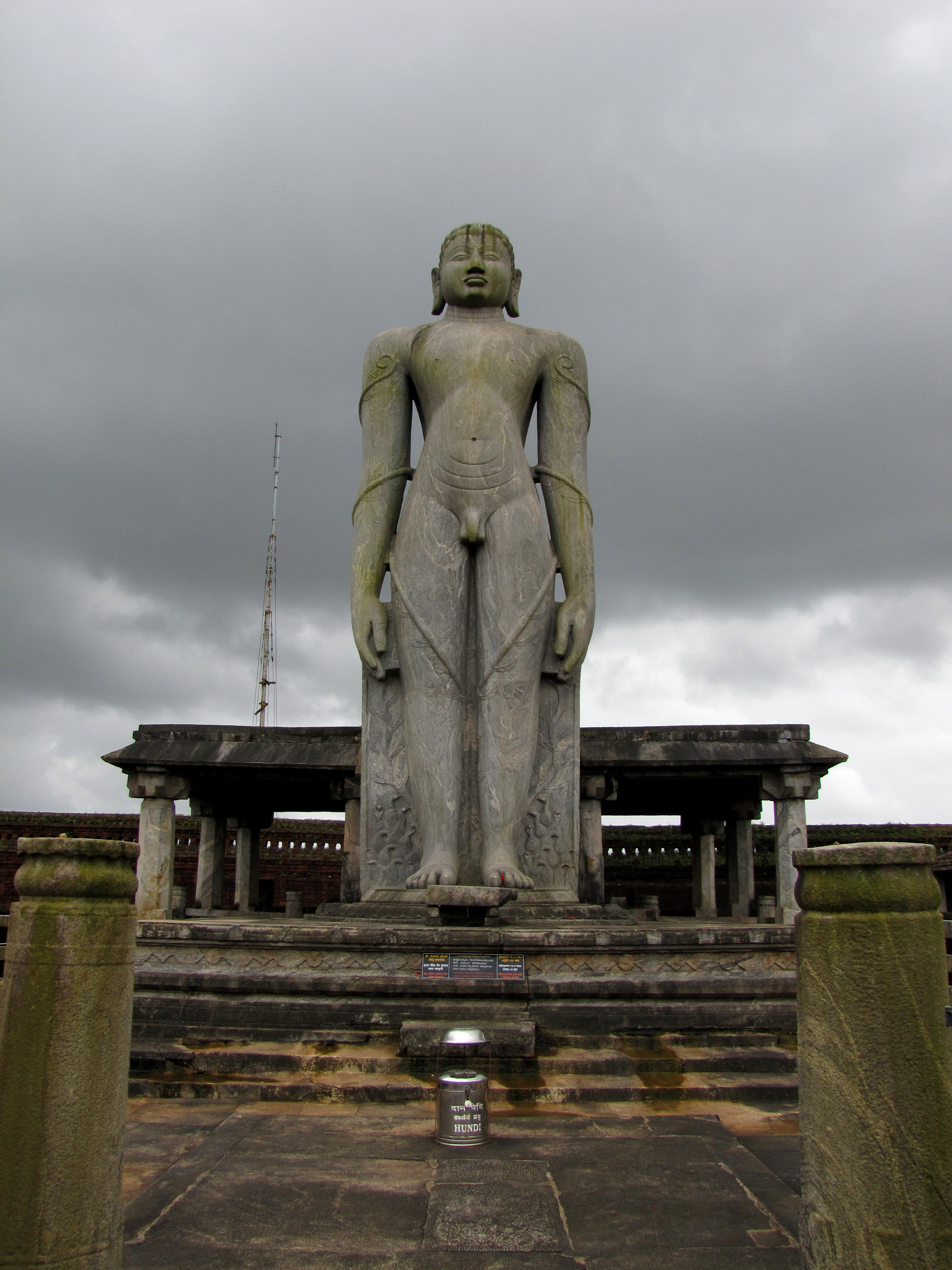
Gommateshwara statue, Karkala (1432 CE)

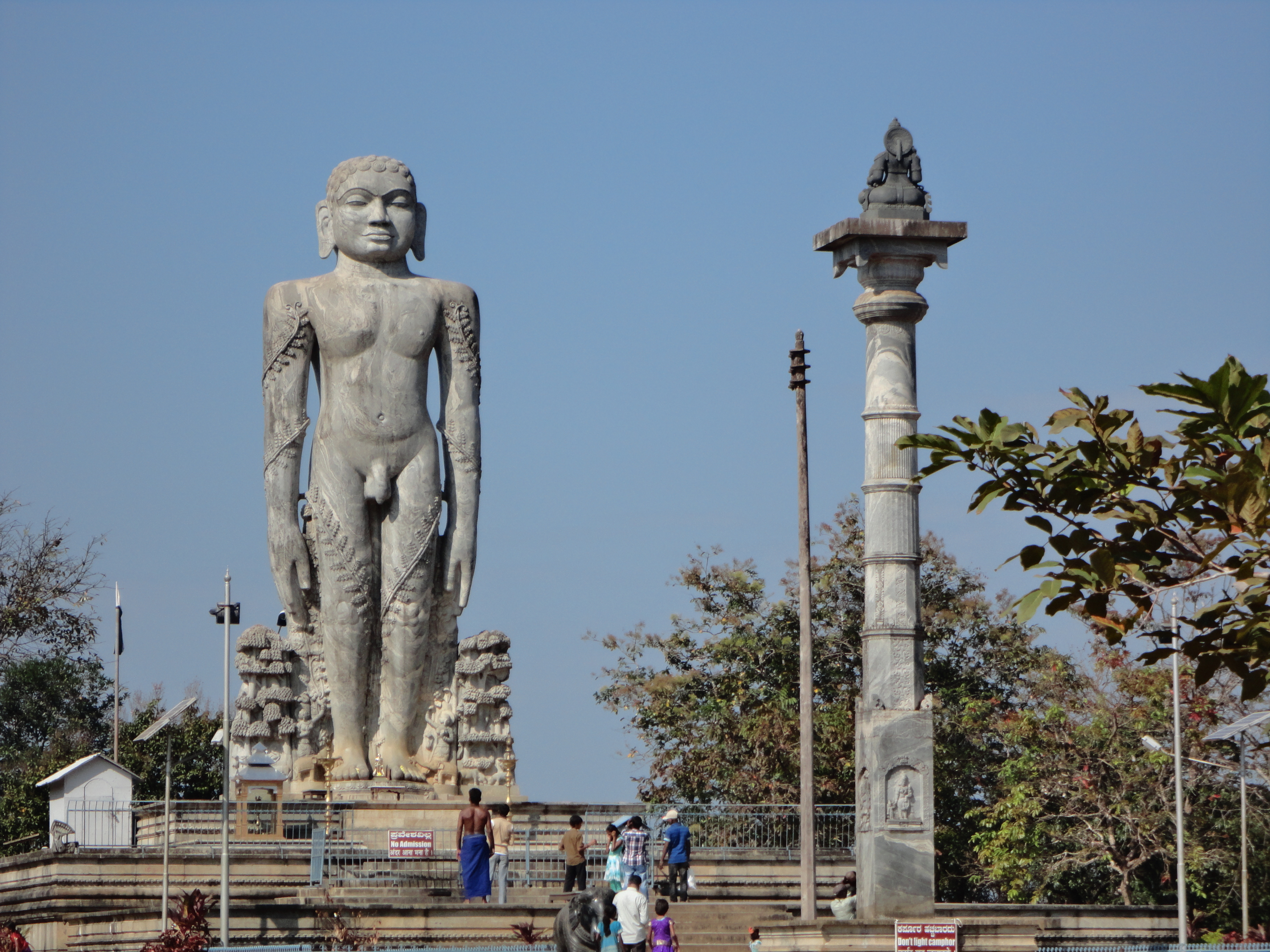
Bahubali monolith of Dharmasthala (1973 CE)

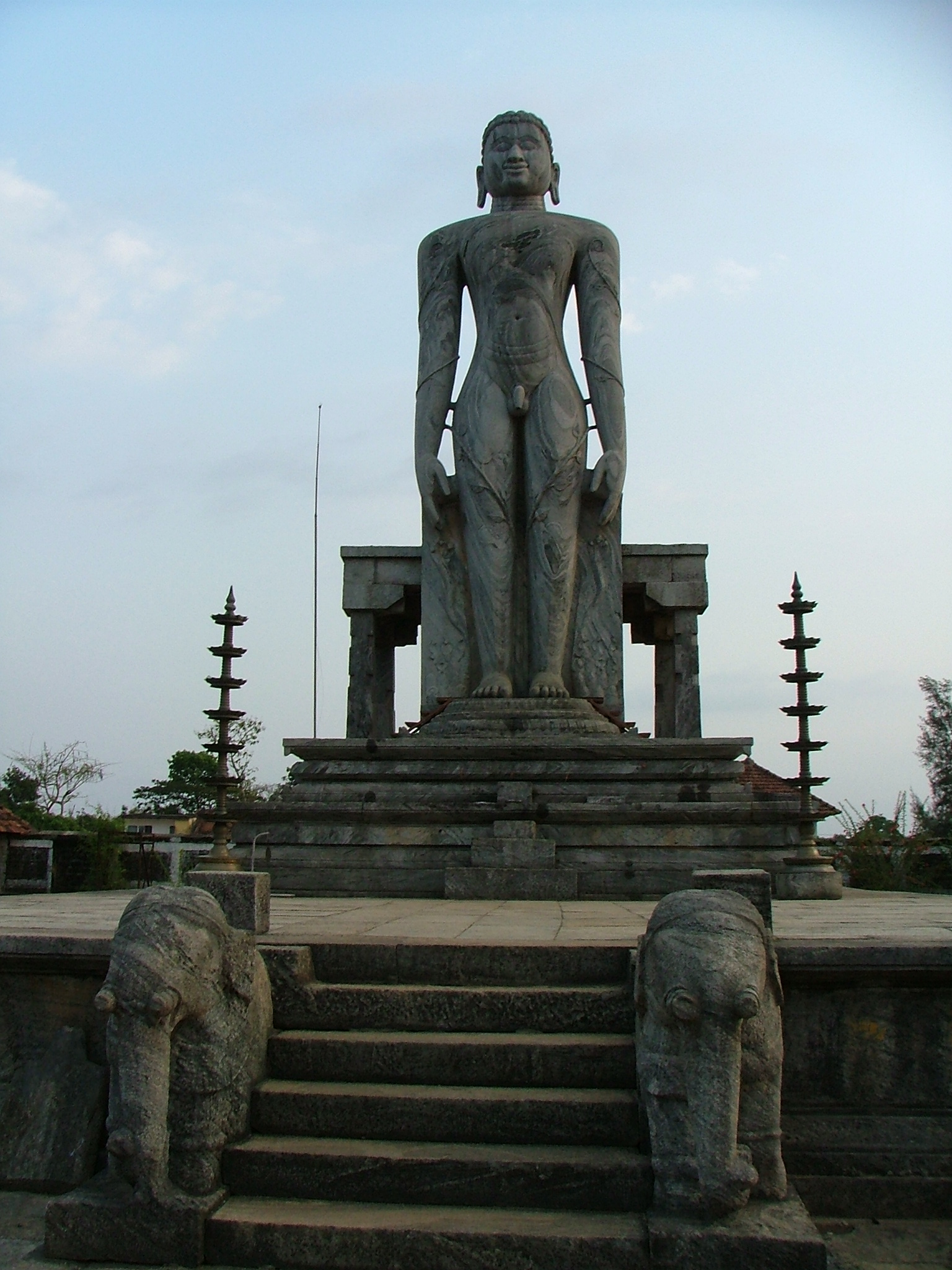
Bahubali monolith of Venur (1604 CE)

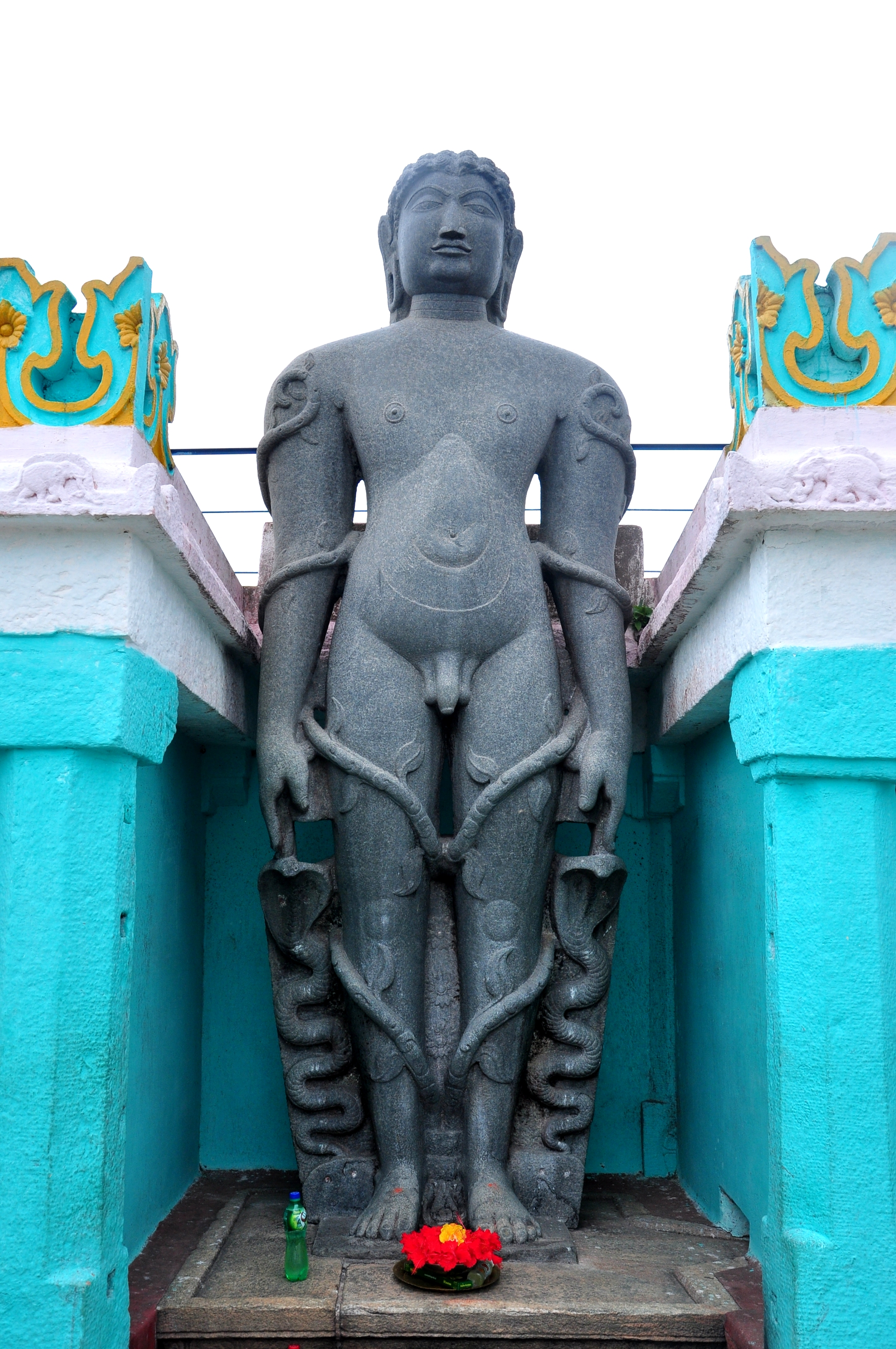
Bahubali status at Gommatagiri (12th Century CE)

== Jainism in North Karnataka ==
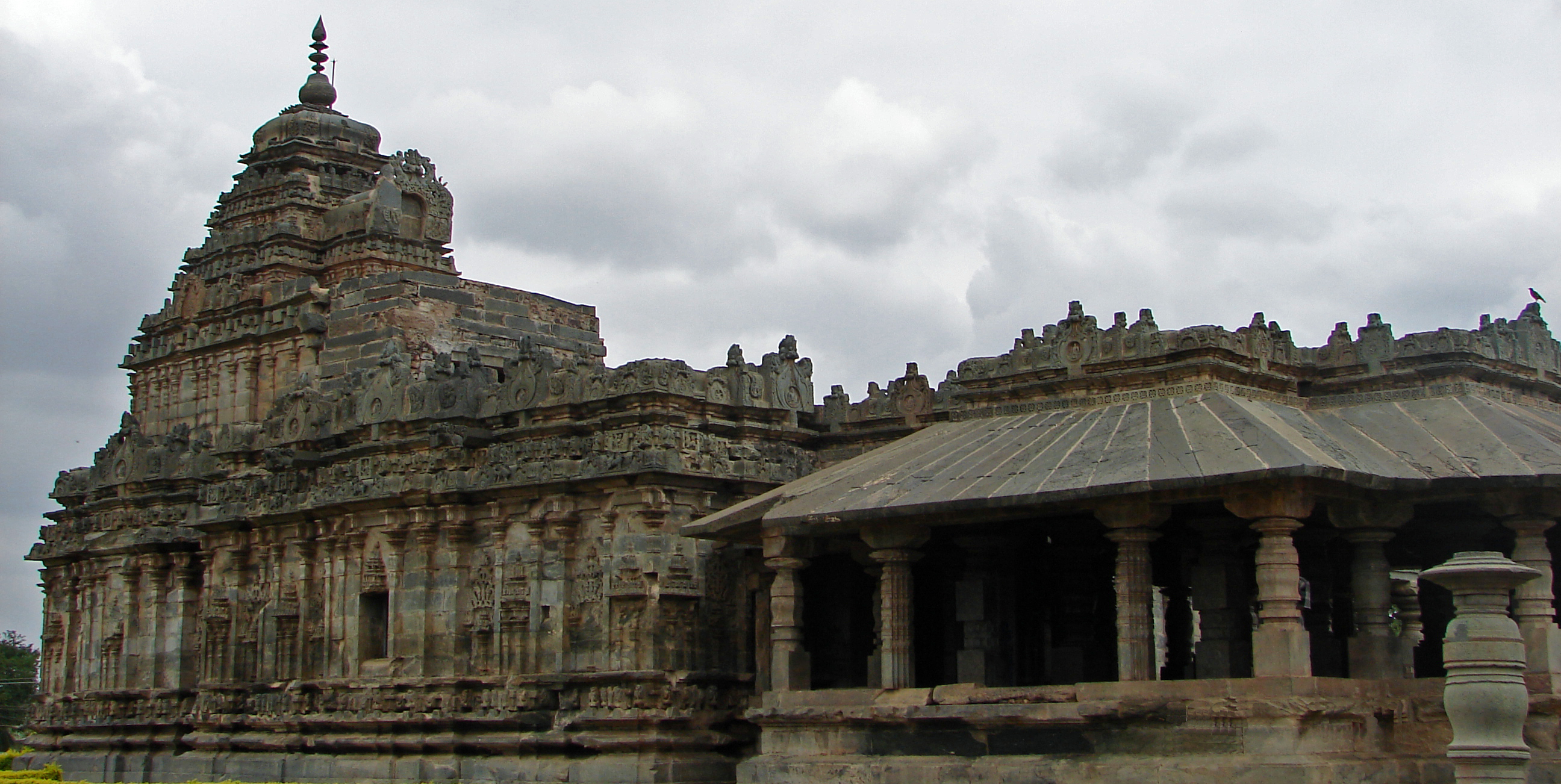
Brahma Jinalaya at Lakkundi

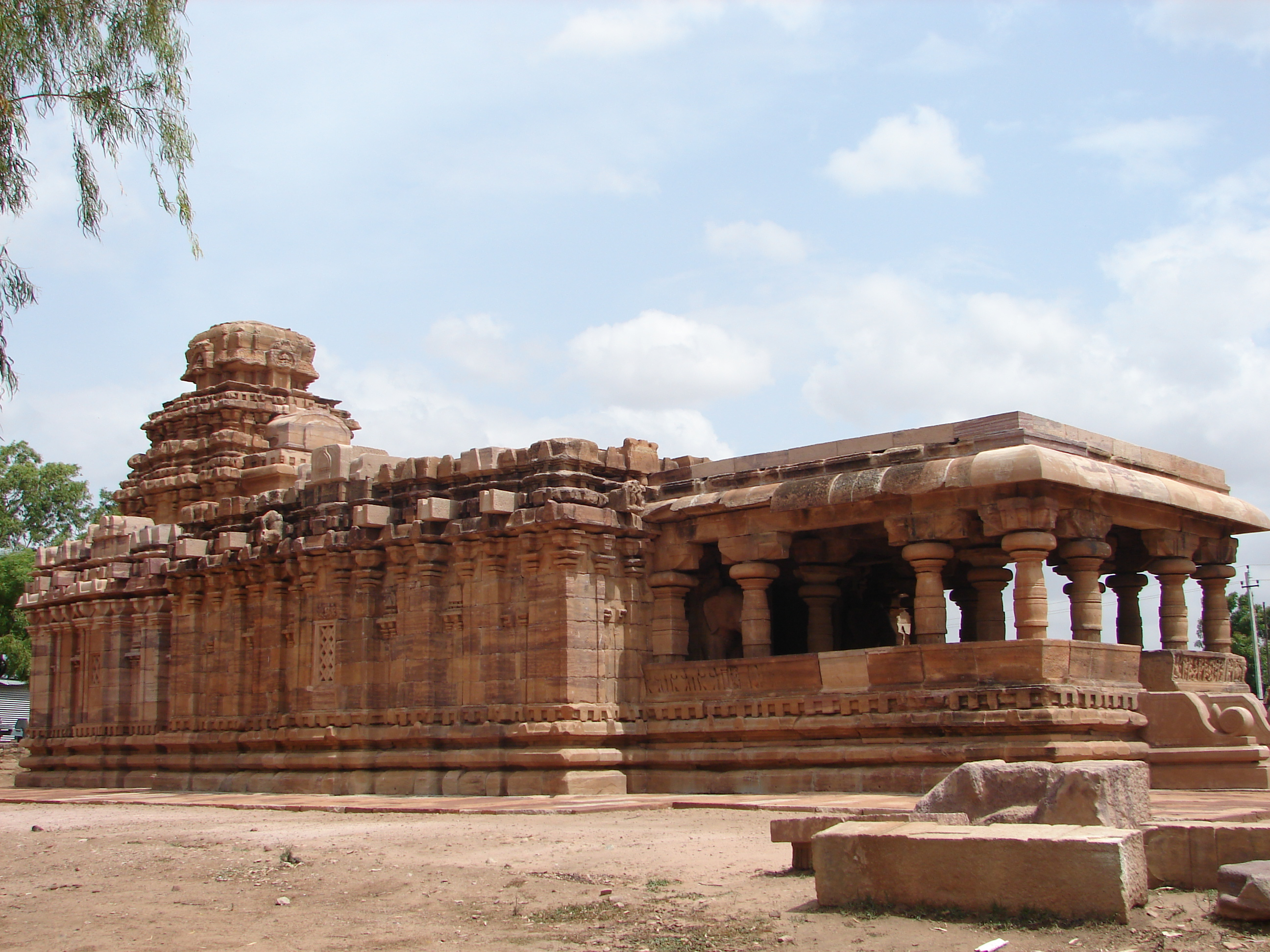
Jain Narayana temple, a UNESCO World Heritage Site

Jainism in North Karnataka flourished under the Chalukyas, Kadamba and Rashtrakutas, and Vijayanagara Empire. Imbued with an intense religious feeling, lavish patronage was extended towards the building of basadis, temples and magnificent statues. Jainism enjoyed the highest repute among the people particularly the ruling classes and the mercantile community thus virtually becoming the state religion.

The earliest dated structure is a Basadi at Halasi built under the Kadamba Dynasty of Banavasi thus laying the foundation for Jain architecture in North Karnataka. Rastrakutas period is the golden age of Jainism in Karnataka. The Jaina monuments of the Rashtrakutas period are found at Pattadakal, Malkhed, Lakshmeshwar, Koppal, Bankur, of North Karnataka. Jainism exerted considerable influence over the cultural life of Karnataka during the rule of the Rashtrakutas.

Kadambas of Banavasi were known to be patrons of Jainism. After the rule of the Kadambas of Banavasi most parts of north Karnataka came under the rule of the early Chalukya or Badami Chalukyas.

The Chalukyas of Badami built cave temples at Badami, Pattadkal and Aihole. Puligere (modern Lakshmeshwara) was a strong centre of religious activities of the Jain monks during this era.

Lakkundi in Gadag District has a large Brahma Jinalaya of Chalukya style, built by a noble lady, Attimabbe.

Navagraha Jain Temple at Varur near Hubli is one of the major pilgrimage. The temple features a 61 feet (18.6 m) tall monolithic idol of the Shri 1008 Bhagavan Parshvanatha and the smaller statues of the other 8 Jain teerthankaras.

== Religious organisations ==
The Dakshin Bharat Jain Sabha is a religious and social service organisation of the Jains of South India. The organisation is headquartered at Kolhapur, Maharashtra, India. The association is credited with being one of the first Jain associations to start reform movements among the Jains in modern India. The organisation mainly seeks to represent the interests of the native Jains of Maharashtra (Marathi Jains), Karnataka (Kannada Jains) and Goa.

== List of famous temples ==
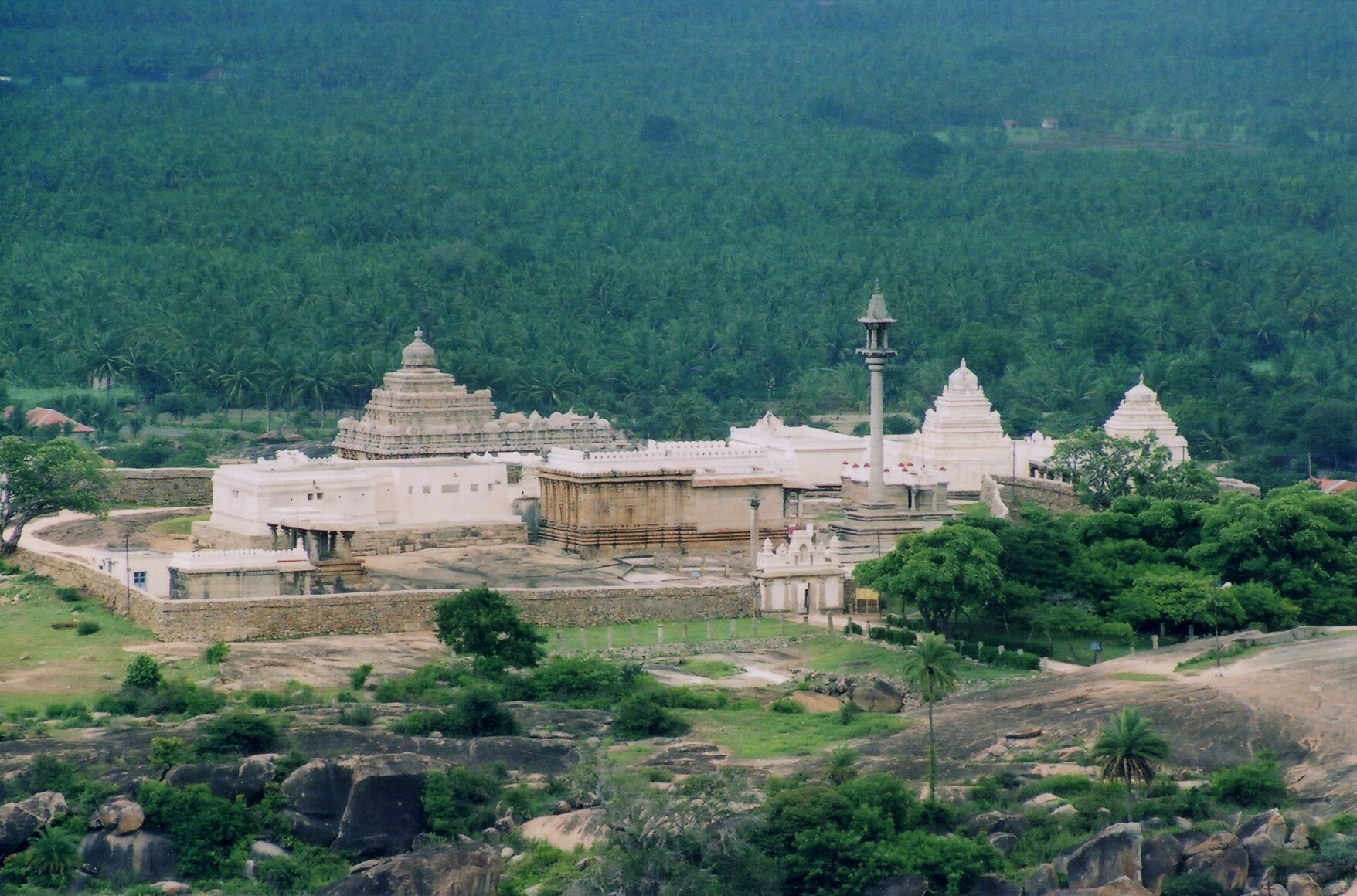
Chandragiri Hill Temple Complex, Shravanbelgola

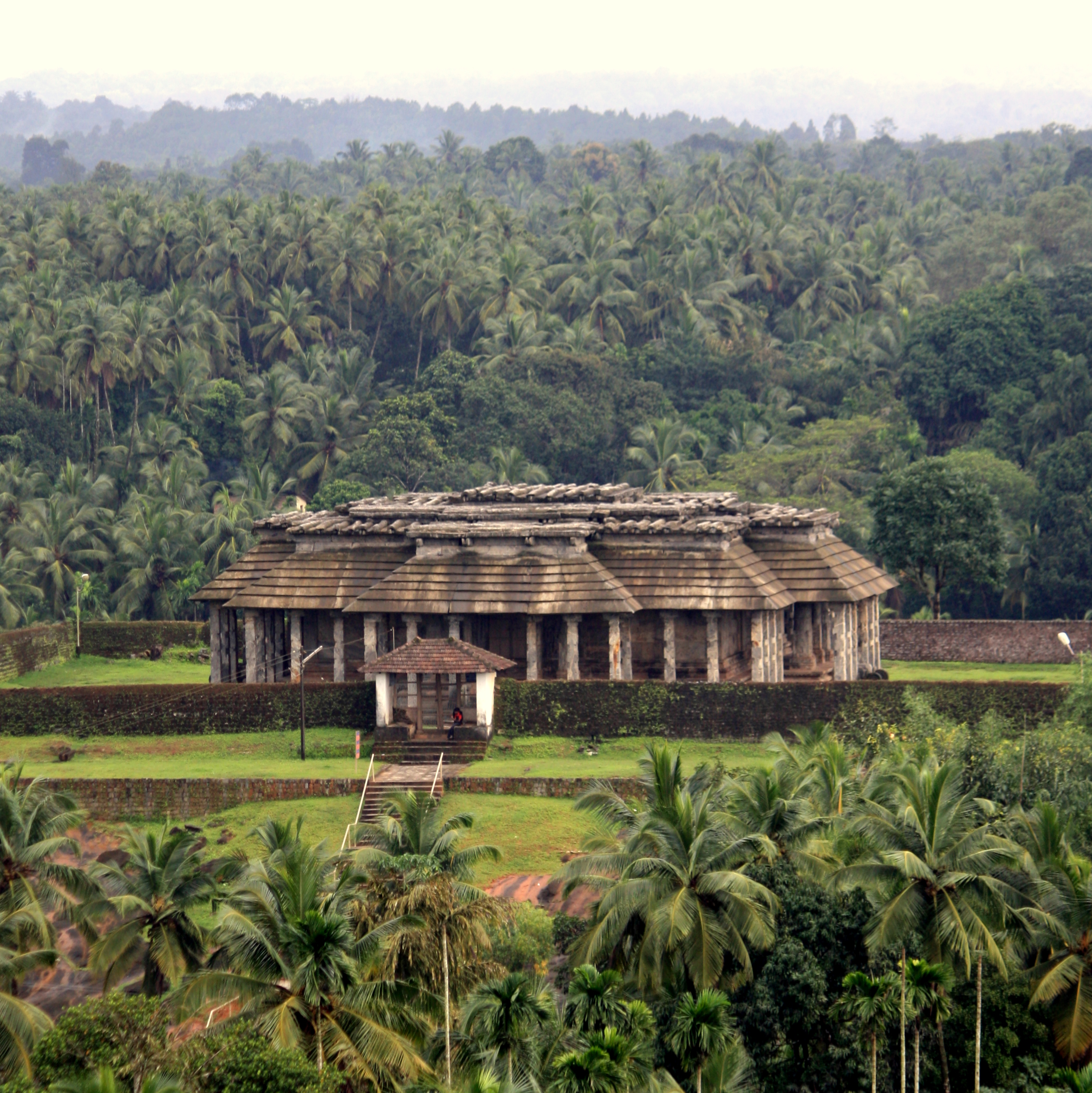
Chaturmukha Basadi

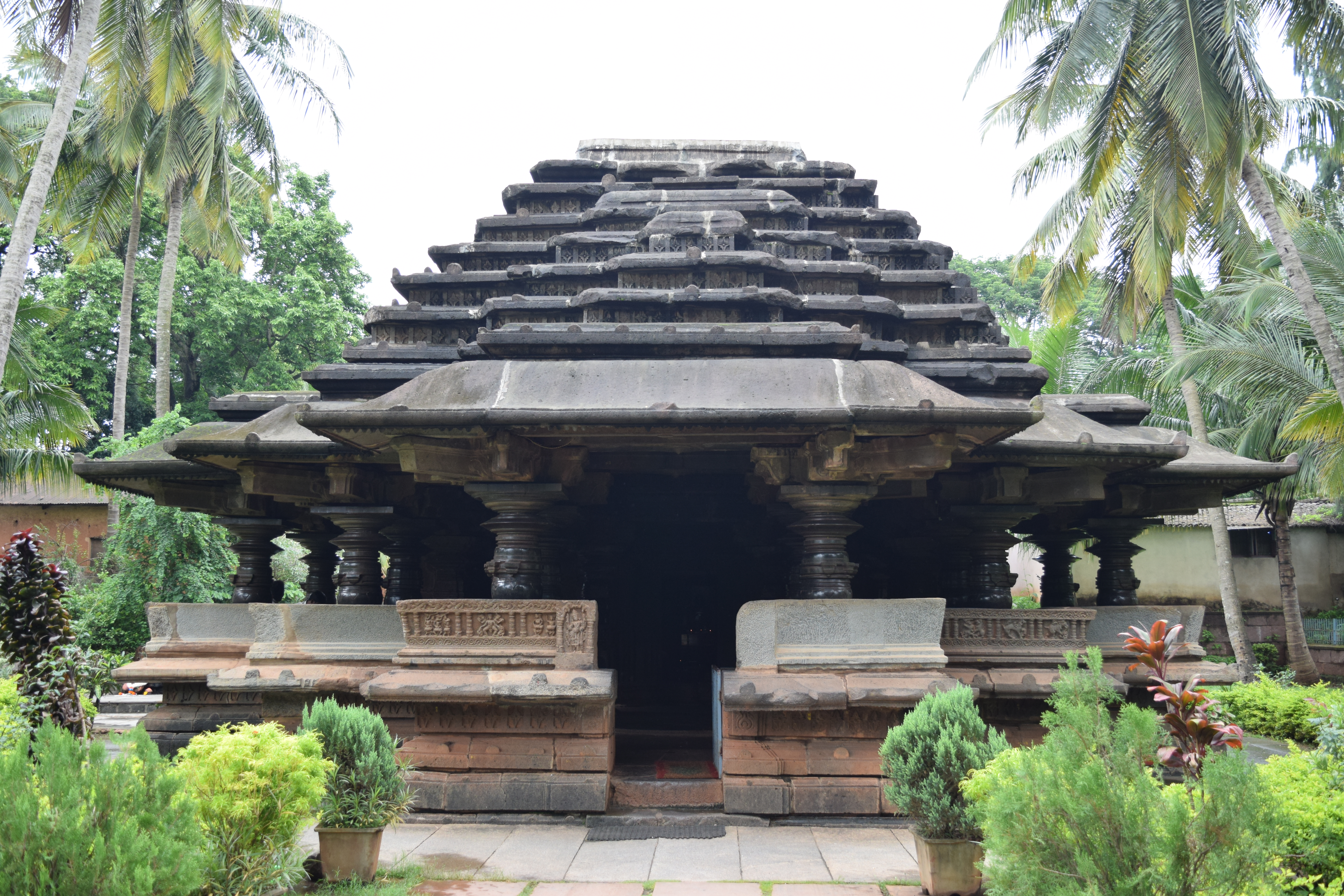
Kamal Basadi

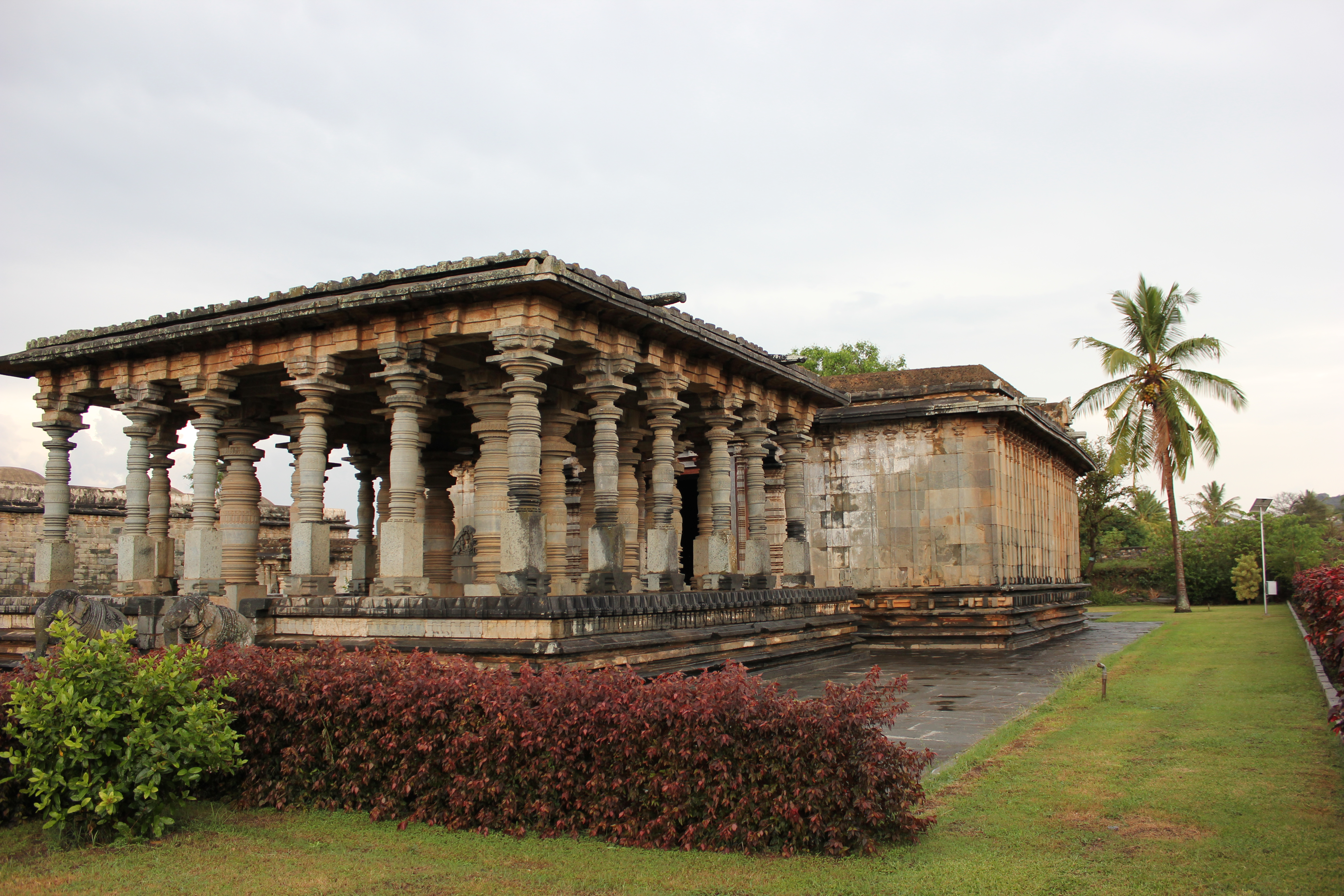
Parshvanath Basadi, Halebidu, a UNESCO World Heritage Site

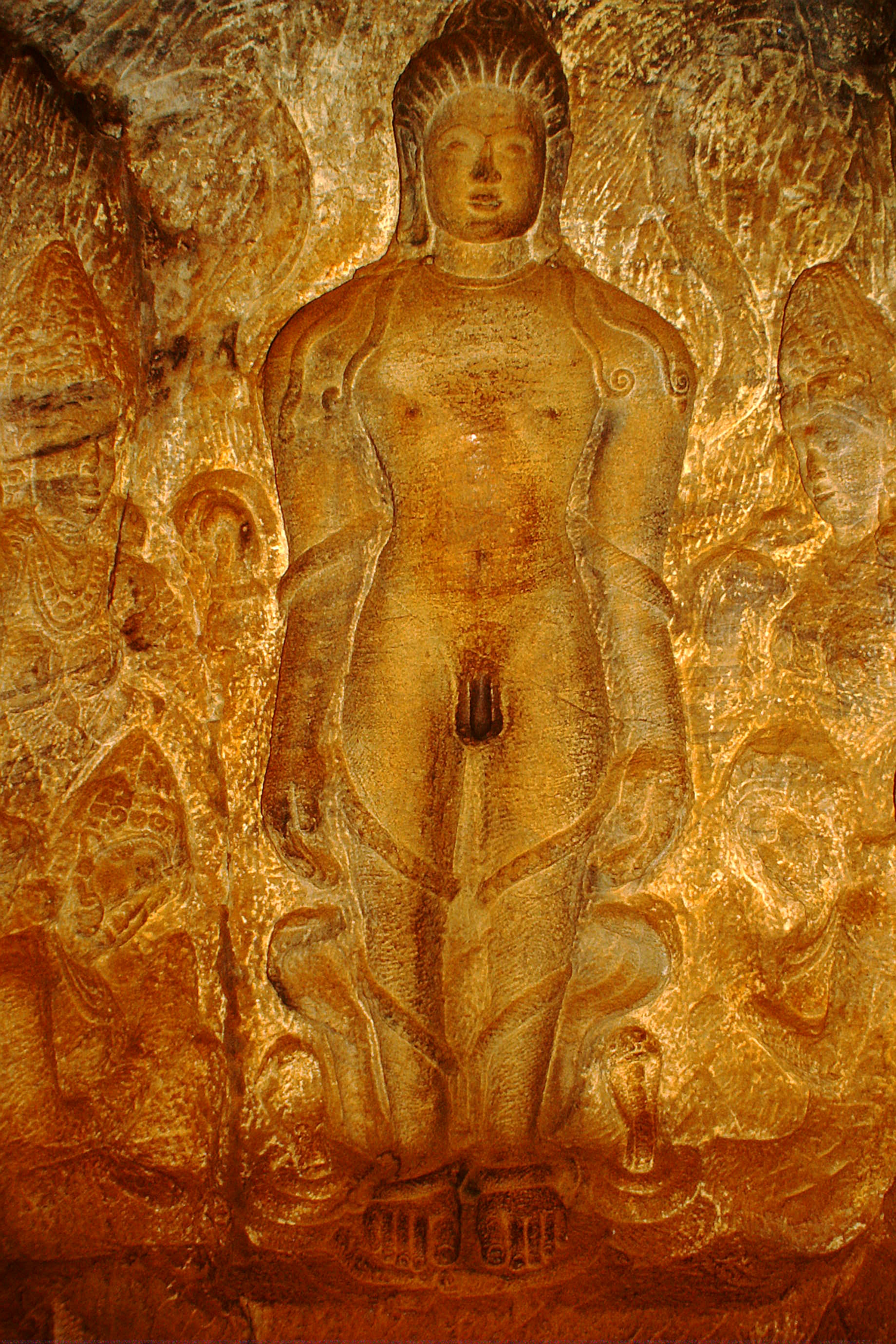
Bahubali in Badami cave temples

Cave temples

- Badami cave temples in Badami
- Aihole cave temple

Main temples

- Shravanabelagola, a monumental statue of Saint Gomateshwar(Bahubali) in Hassan district.
- Karkala, 1. Hiriyangadi Basadi 2. Chathurmukha Basadi 3. Padmavathi Kere Basadi. The famous monolithic 42 feet (13 m) Gommateshwara statue, the second tallest in Karnataka is also here.
- Dharmasthala, a 39 feet (12 m) Gomateshwara idol.
- Venur, a 35 feet (11 m) Gomateshwara idol.
- Gommatagiri, a 20 feet (6.1 m) Gomateshwara idol.
- Moodabidri, 18 ancient Jain temple including Saavira Kambada Basadi the Thousand Pillars Temple and Guru Basadi
- Brahma Jinalaya in Lakkundi
- Humcha Jain temples
- Navagraha Jain Temple in Hubli
- Sankighatta
- Jain Narayana Temple, Pattadakal
- Kundadri : It is said this is Samadhi sthal of Acharya Kundakunda
- Chaturmukha Basadi in Karkala
- Akkana Basadi
- Odegal basadi
- Parshvanatha basadi
- Basadi complex, Halebidu : 1. Parshvanatha Basadi 2. Shantinatha Basadi 3. Adinatha Basadi
- Varanga – This is an important Jain centre. The Kere basadi is located in midst of a lake. There are many other basadis too.
- Aihole Jain complex - Meguti Jain temple, Charanthimatha Group of temples, Yoginarayana group and Jain cave temple
- Kanakagiri Jain tirth
- Shanka Basadi & Ananthanatha basadi at Lakshmeshwara
- Chandragupta basadi
- Basadi complex in Shravanabelagola
- Shantinatha Basadi, Jinanathapura
- Panchakuta Basadi, Kambadahalli
- Hadavalli Jain Temple
- Chavundaraya Basadi
- Narasimharajapura
- Kamal Basadi & Chikki Basadi at Belgaum Fort
- Chaturmukha Basadi, Gerusoppa
- Mandaragiri
- Aretippur Jain temple
- Jain Bhattaraka Math at Manyakheta
- Aagam Mandir, Tumkur
- Kamthana Jain temple
- Shri 1008 Adinath Digamber Jin Mandir, Jayanagar, Bangalore
- Shri Mahavira Digambara Jain temple, Chickpet
- Kalya (Kalyana pura)
- Gundwad Jain Basadi
- Kathale Basadi, Barkur
- Sri Parshwanath Swamy Basadi
- Shri Parshwa Sushil Dham, Attibele
- Jain temple inside Hangal Fort, Hubli
- Hampi Jain complex
- Padmabbarasi Basadi, Naregal
- Shantinatha Basadi, Kalaghatagi
- Godageri
- Sargur
- Shri Parshwa Sushil Dham
- Shri 1008 Bhagwan Neminath Digambar Jain Basadi., Terdal
- Shri khetra Badragiri, Halingali

== Notable Karnataka Jains ==
- Rani Chennabhairadevi
- Kumudendu Muni - Author of Siribhoovalaya, a unique multi-lingual literary work.
- Shivakotiacharya
- Chavundaraya- Poet
- Hampa Nagarajaiah
- Justice T. K. Tukol
- Mukhyamantri Chandru
- Professor Padmanabh S Jaini
- Veerendra Heggade
- Abhayachandra Jain
- Shubhachandra - Retd. Jainology Professor, Mysore University
- Bhavya
- Rani Abbakka
- Durvinita - king
- Amogavarsha - emperor, Pampa, Ranna, Ajitprasad,
- Dr.Priti Shrimandhar Kumar - Retired Professor(Mysore University), Previous Director- Kuvempu Institute of Kannada Studies.

Justice R.S.Mahendra

== Photo gallery ==
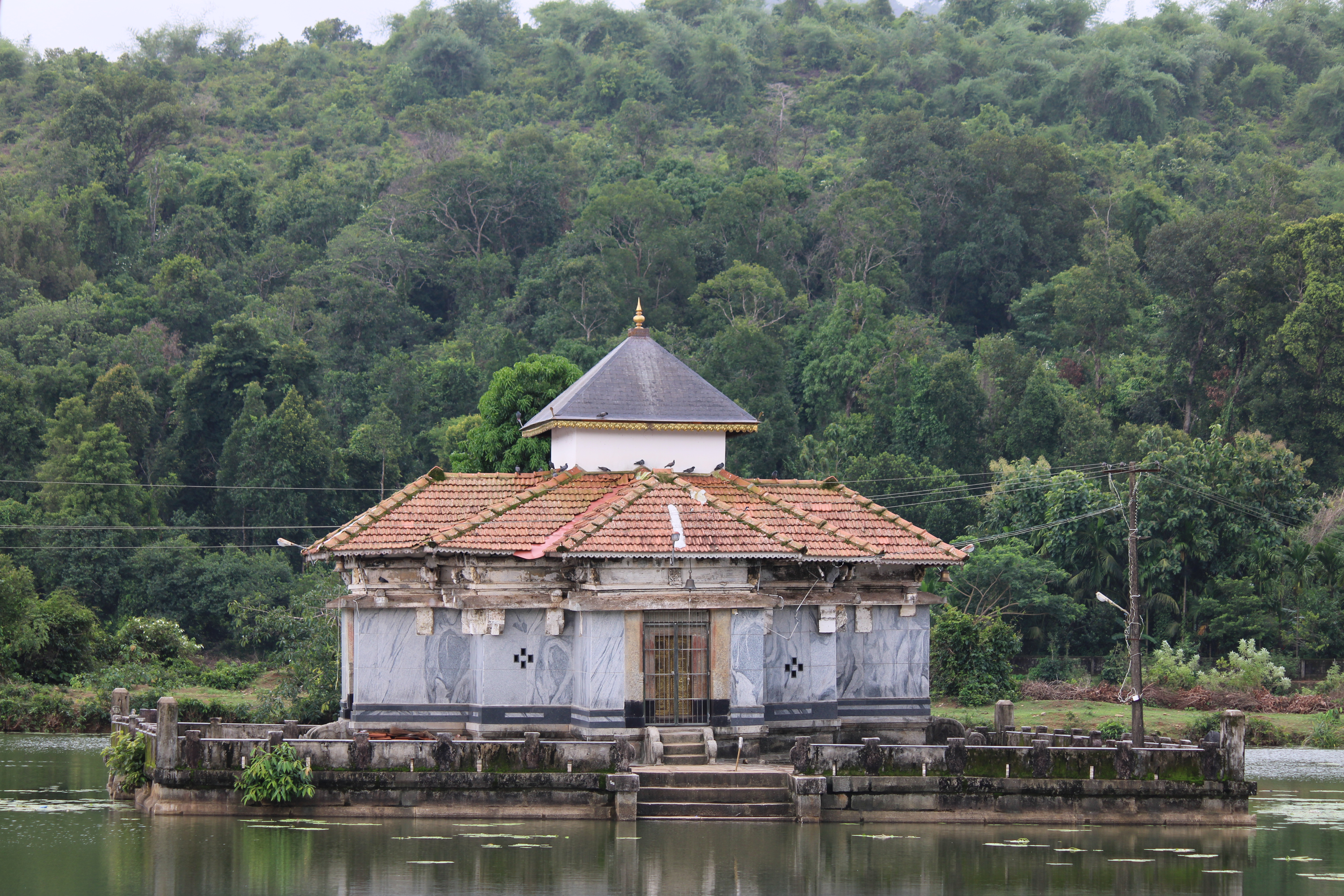
Kere Basadi

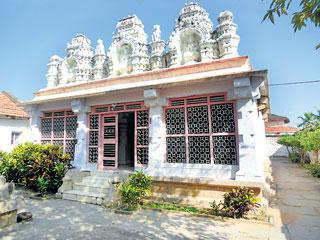
Sankighatta

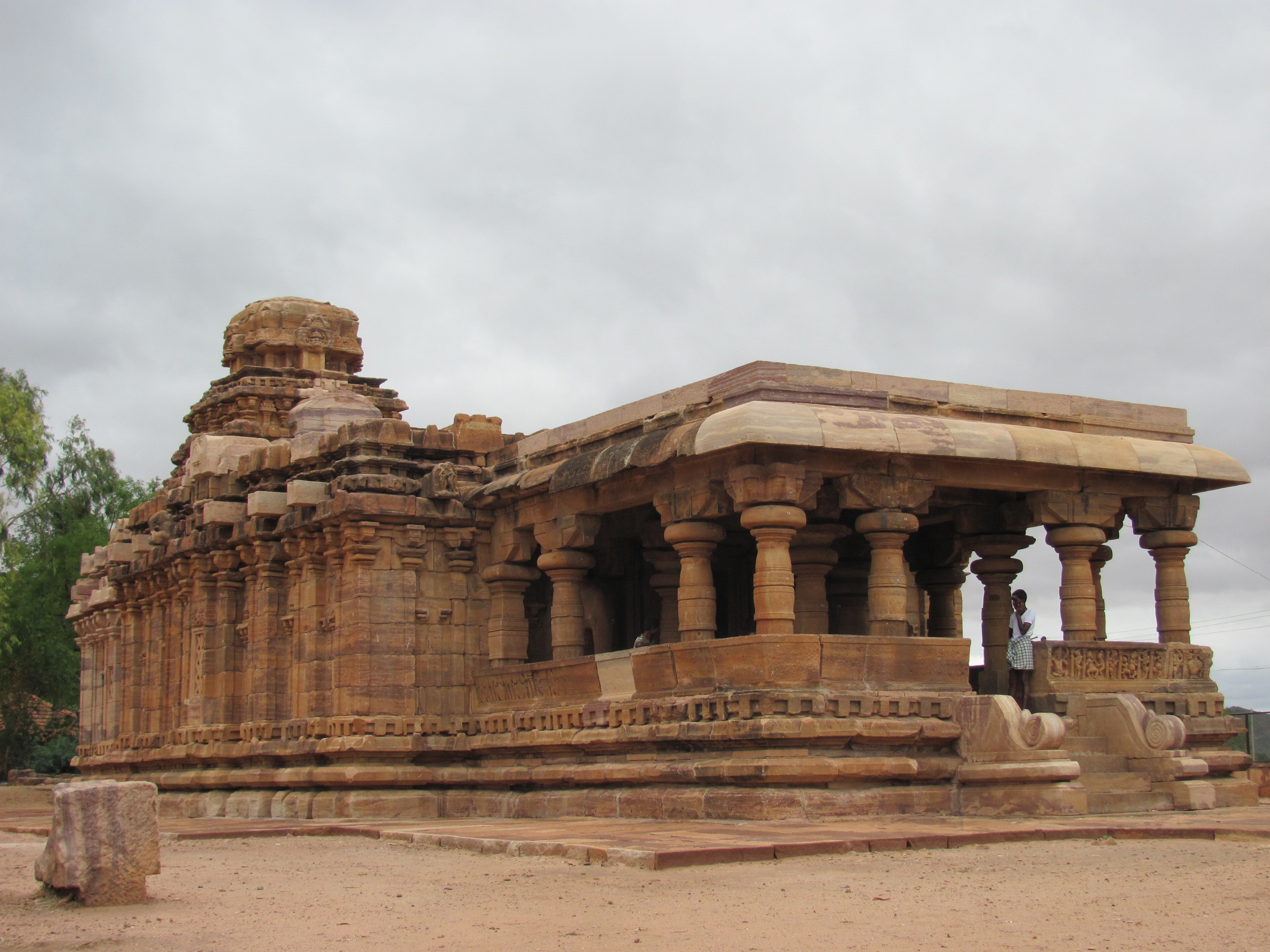
Meguti Jain temple, Aihole

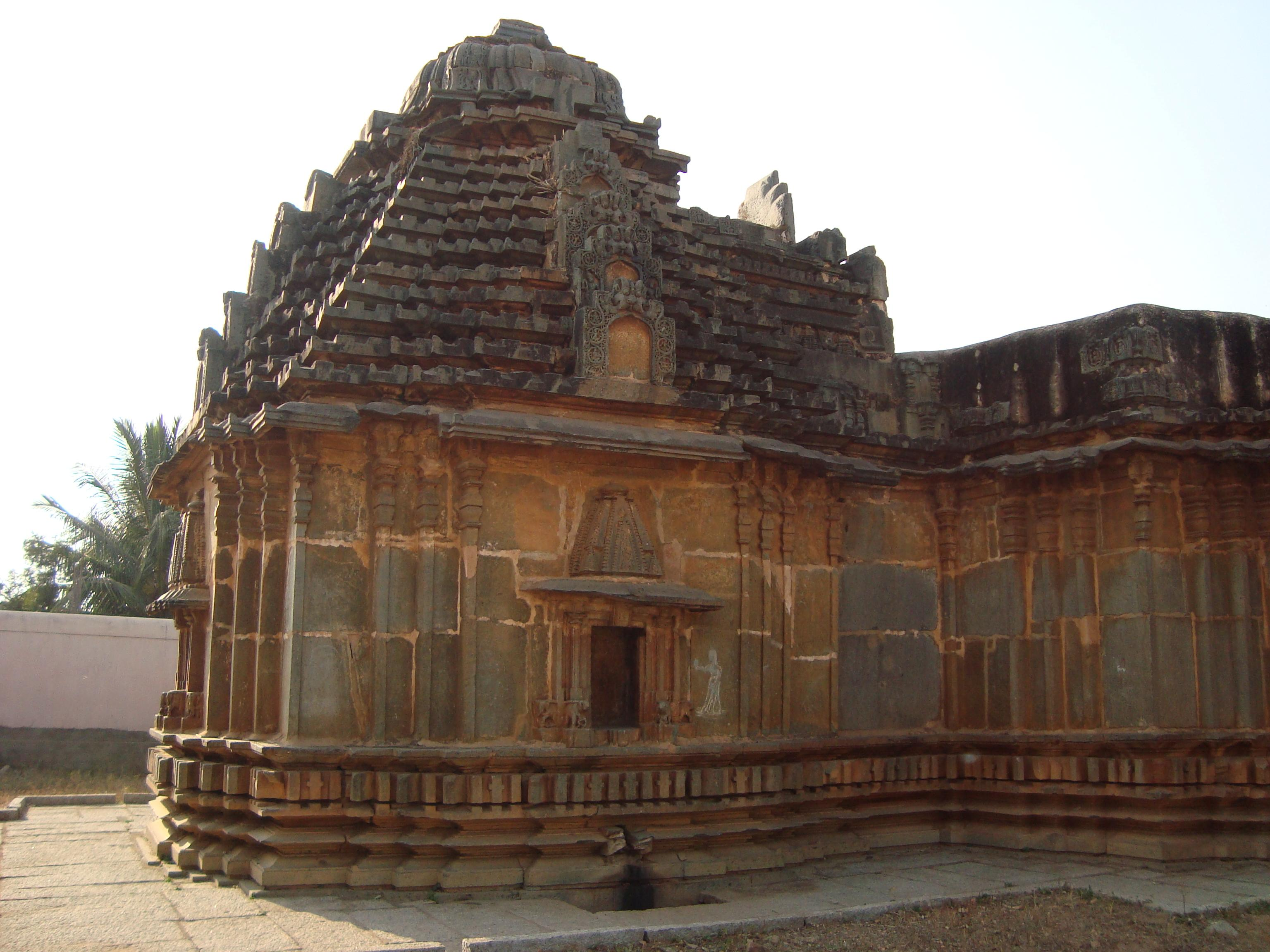
Shanka Basadi, 8th century

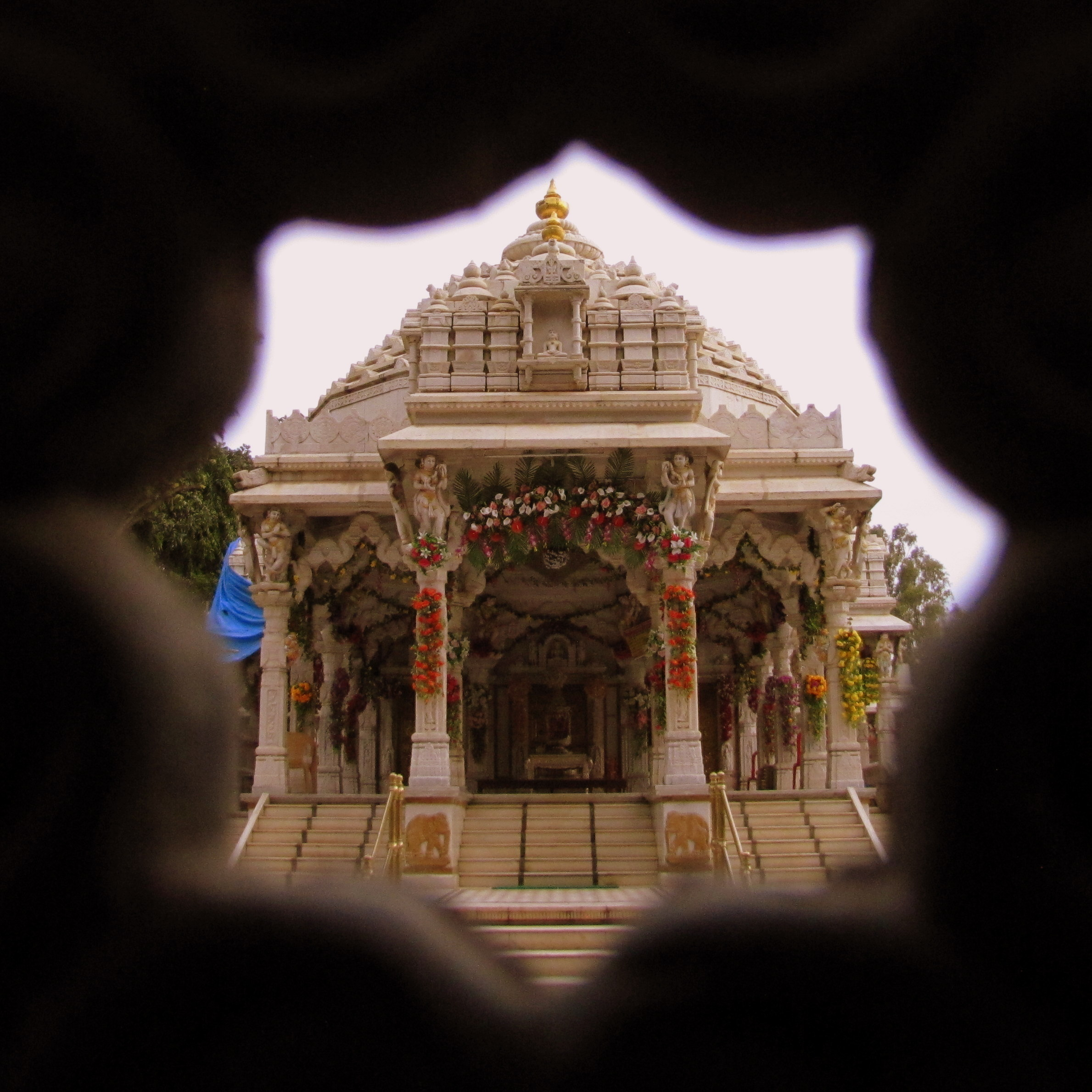
Adinath Jain temple, Bangalore

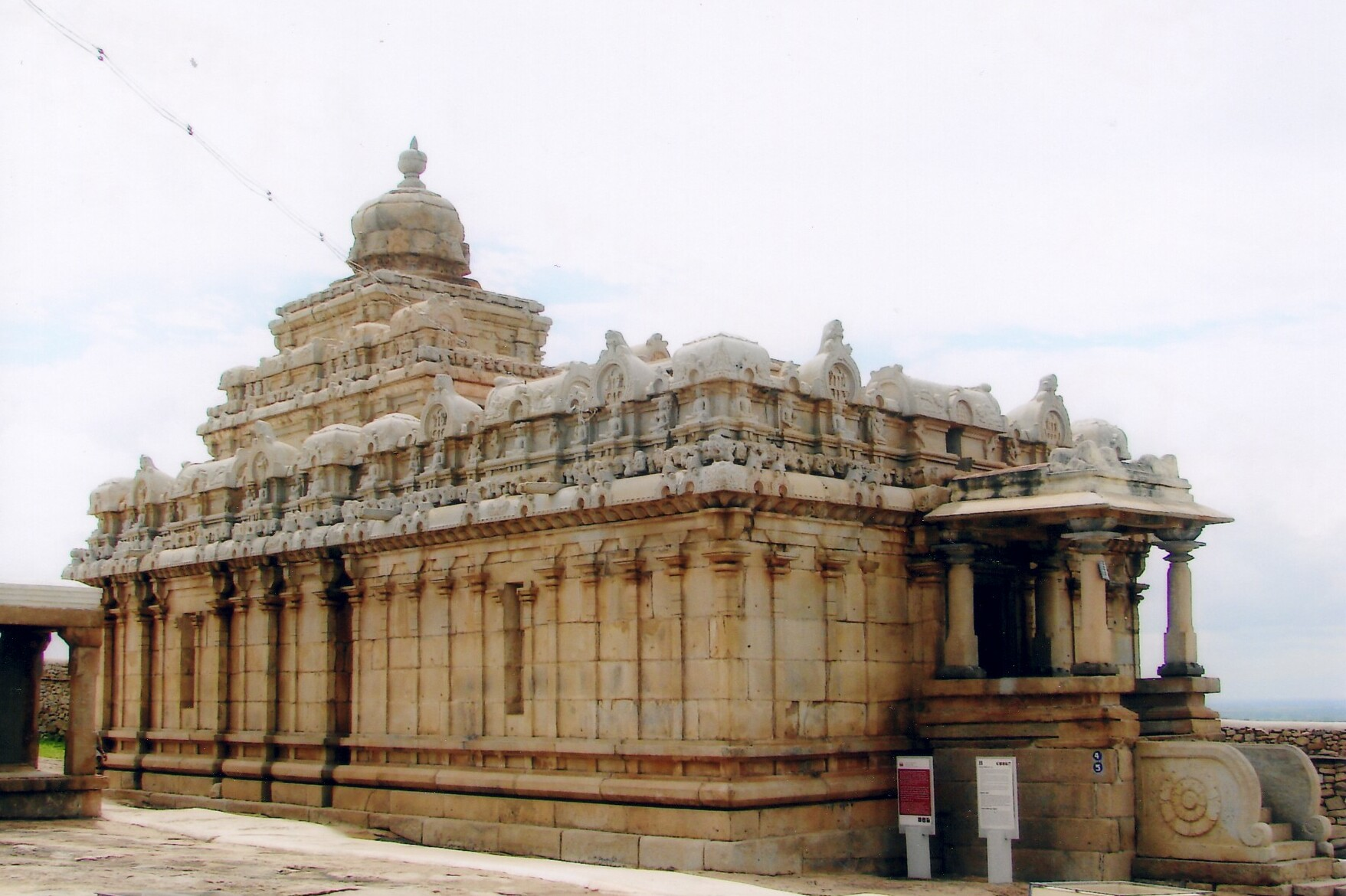
Chavundaraya Basadi, Shravanabelagola

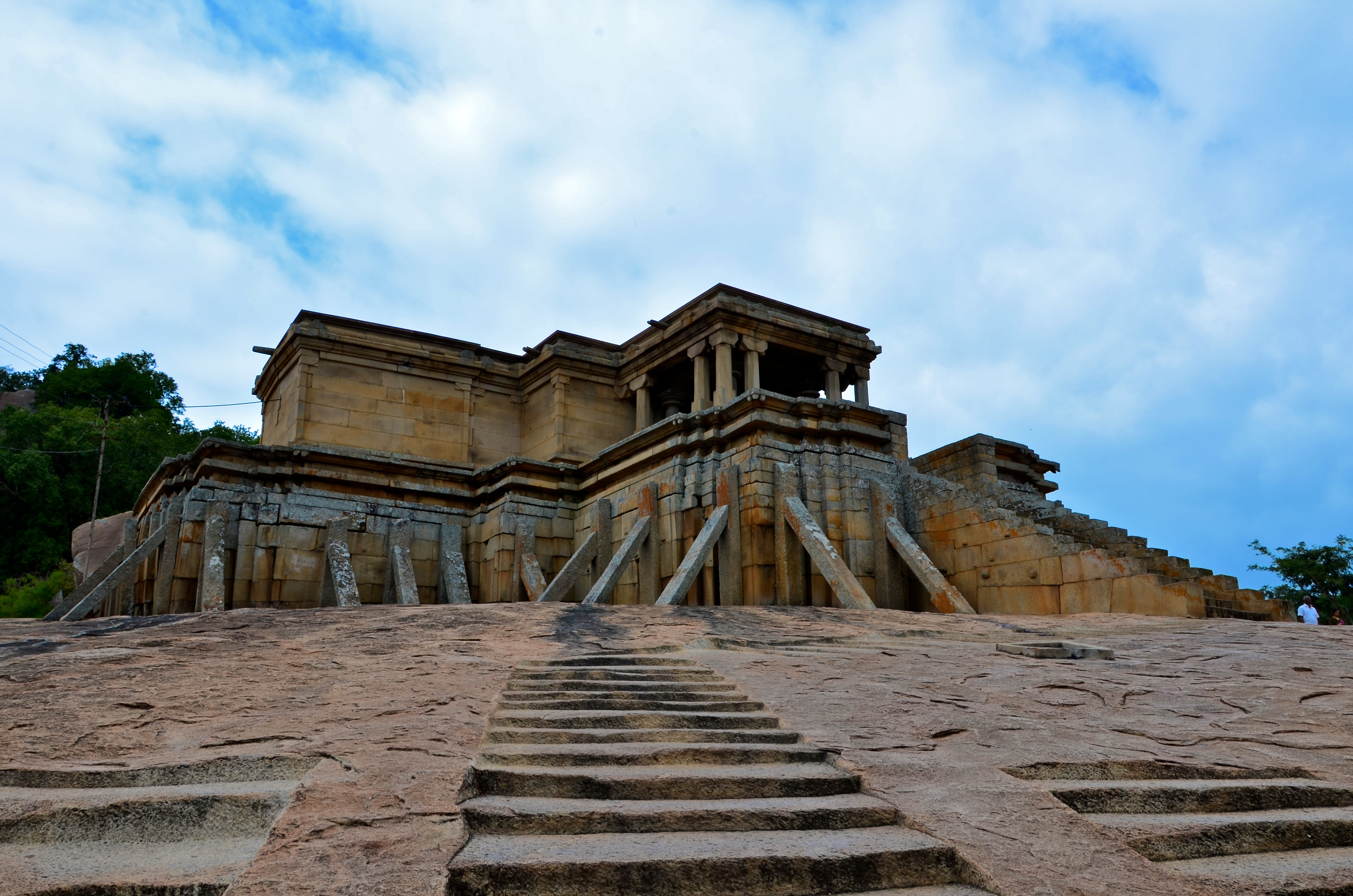
Odegal Basadi, Vindhyagiri Hill

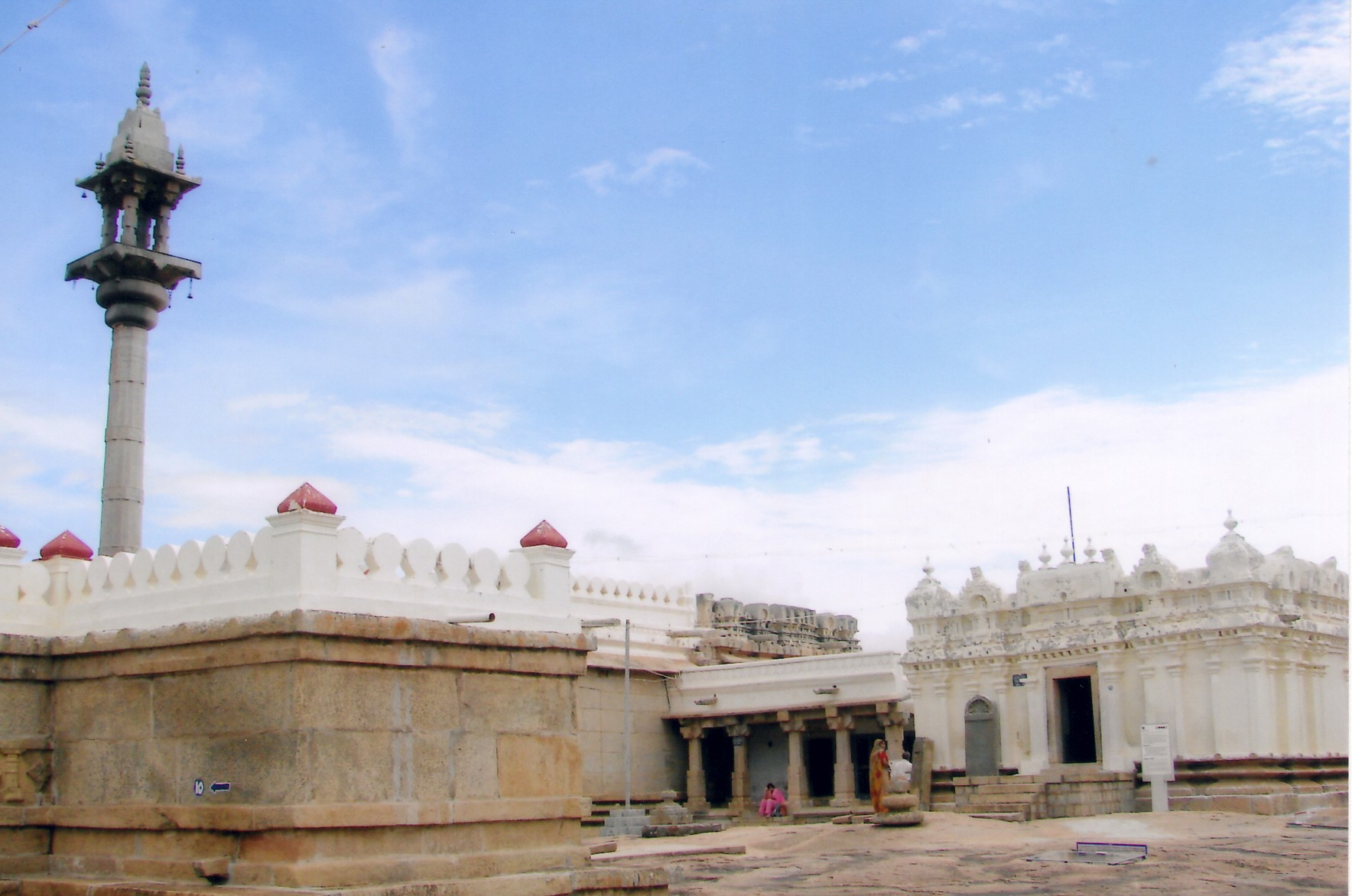
Chandragupta basadi

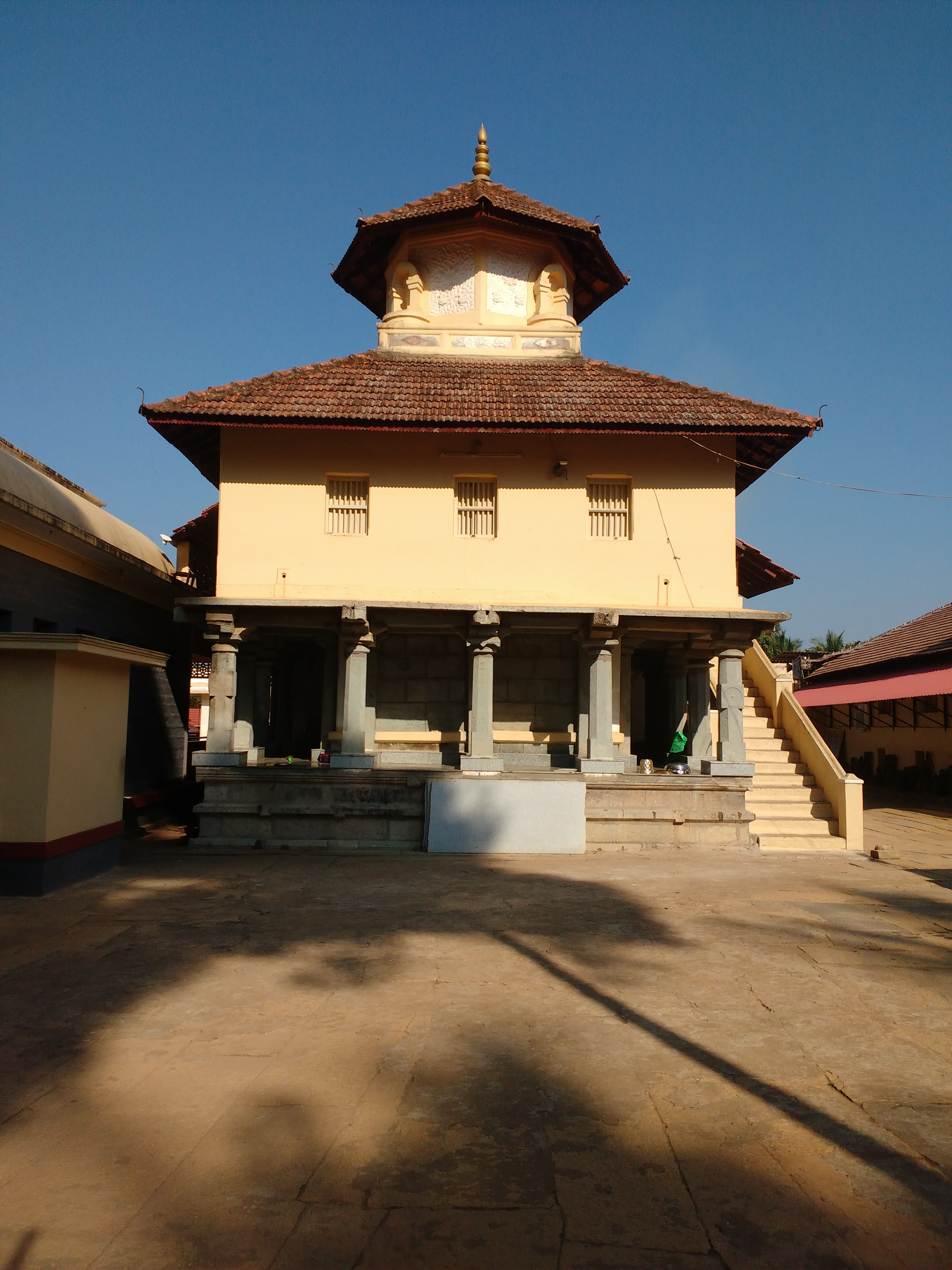
Humcha

== See also ==
- History of Jainism
- Timeline of Jainism
- Jainism in North Karnataka
- History of Karnataka
- Kalya Inscriptions
