= Kere Basadi =

Jain temple in Karnataka, India

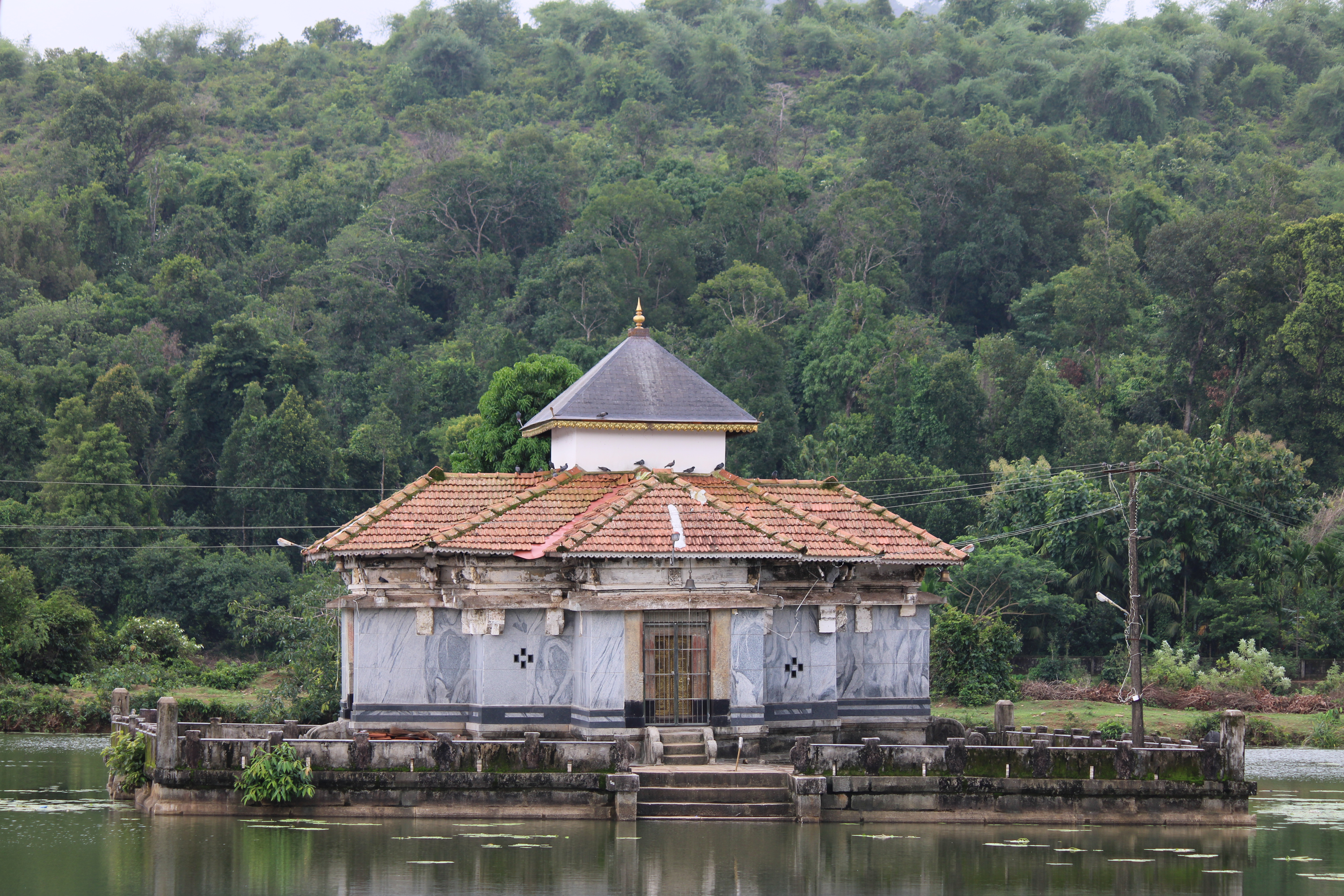
- Kere Basadi

Religion
- Affiliation: Jainism
- Deity: Parshvanath
- Festivals: Rathotsava, Mahavir Jayanti
- Governing body: Karkala Jain Mutt

Location
- Location: Varanga, Udupi, Karnataka
- Interactive map of Kere Basadi
- Coordinates: 13°23′46.53″N 75°0′30.14″E

Architecture
- Creator: Varanga Raya
- Established: 12th century

Kere Basadi (meaning: Lake temple) or Chaturmukha Basadi is a Jain temple located in Varanga village in Udupi district of Karnataka, India. This 12th-century temple is situated amidst of a lake giving it the name Kere Basadi (lake temple). (Note: ₹9.13 crore (US$948,082) for developing the Udupi includes Jain basadis in Varanga.) The temple is also known Chaturmukha Basadi as it houses a chaturmukha (four-faced) idol of tirthankaras. The temple is situated 26 km from Karkala, another popular Jain centre.

== History ==
The temple dates back to 850 years back. The Sripurana, found Jain matha at Varanga, is one of the famous 8th century work by Jain tamils. The Jain Matha is an offshoot of the Humcha Jain Matha. This matha is said to have been a segment of Mula Kundakundanvaya Kranurgana's Mesha Pashana Gaccha. According to an inscription found in Neminath Basadi, dating back to 1424 CE, King Deva Raya II of the Vijayanagara Empire visited the temple and granted land for operation. The inscription also mentions a Jain Matha existence before installation of the inscription. The matha is estimated to date back to c. 8th–9th-century CE. There is an inscription dating 1515 CE and 1522 CE mentioning of grants sanctioned by a Jain businessman and Chenna Bhairava respectively.

== About temple ==
Kere Basadi is a 12th-century temple, considered to be unique for being situated in the middle of a lake. The mulnayak of the temple is Parshvanatha, the 23rd Tirthankara. The temple is built in chaturmukha style, having four entrance and a chaturmukha idol with images of Parshvanatha, Neminatha, Shantinatha, and Anantanatha representing the four cardinal direction. The temple also houses an idol of Padmavati. According to beliefs, performing puja (praying) here brings prosperity. There is also a ritual for people to visit the shrine before marriage. As per popular belief, the falling of flower from the right side of the idol is a blessing. One has to take a boat to reach the temple. Anekere village of Hassan district has a replica of this shrine erected in the 15th century.

=== Other temples ===
Neminatha Basadi is a stone temple built in 9th century. The shrine is 70 by 70 feet (21 m × 21 m) in dimensions with a thatched roof. The temple has an ornate torana housing an image of seated tirthankar. The temple houses an 5 feet black-colored idol of Neminatha in padmasan posture as the mulnayak deity of the temple. Temple also houses a bronze idol of Mahavira, Ambika, and Padmavati. A small shrine dedicated to Kshetrapala exists in the temple premises. The shrine features a 45 feet tall monolithic manastambha built in the 12th century.

The Kathale Basadi, Mathada Basadi, and Chandranath Basadi are other important temples in the region dating back 1,000 years.

== In popular culture ==
The temple was featured in Mugulu Nage song Kere Yeri.

== Festivals ==
The rathotsava (chariot festival) is the primary festival of this temple, and a five-day event is organized annually in February. Buta Kola is organised to celebrate Navaratri, Dusshera, Diwali. On Vijayadashami, Ratha Yatra with an idol of Padmavathi Devi is organized to commemorate the procession of King Deva Raya II during Vijayadashami.

== Gallery ==
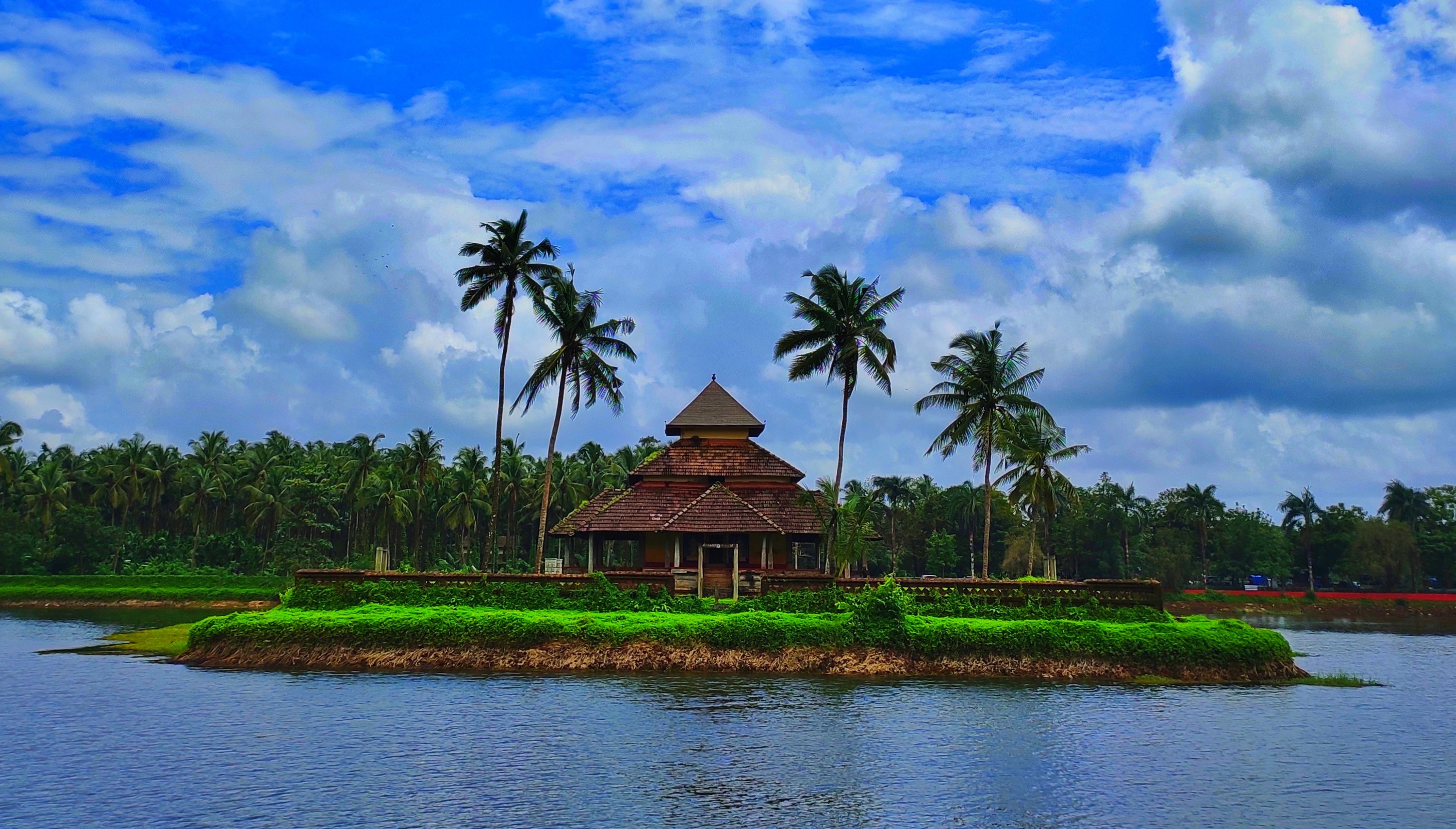
Replica of Kere Basadi at Anekere built in 16th century

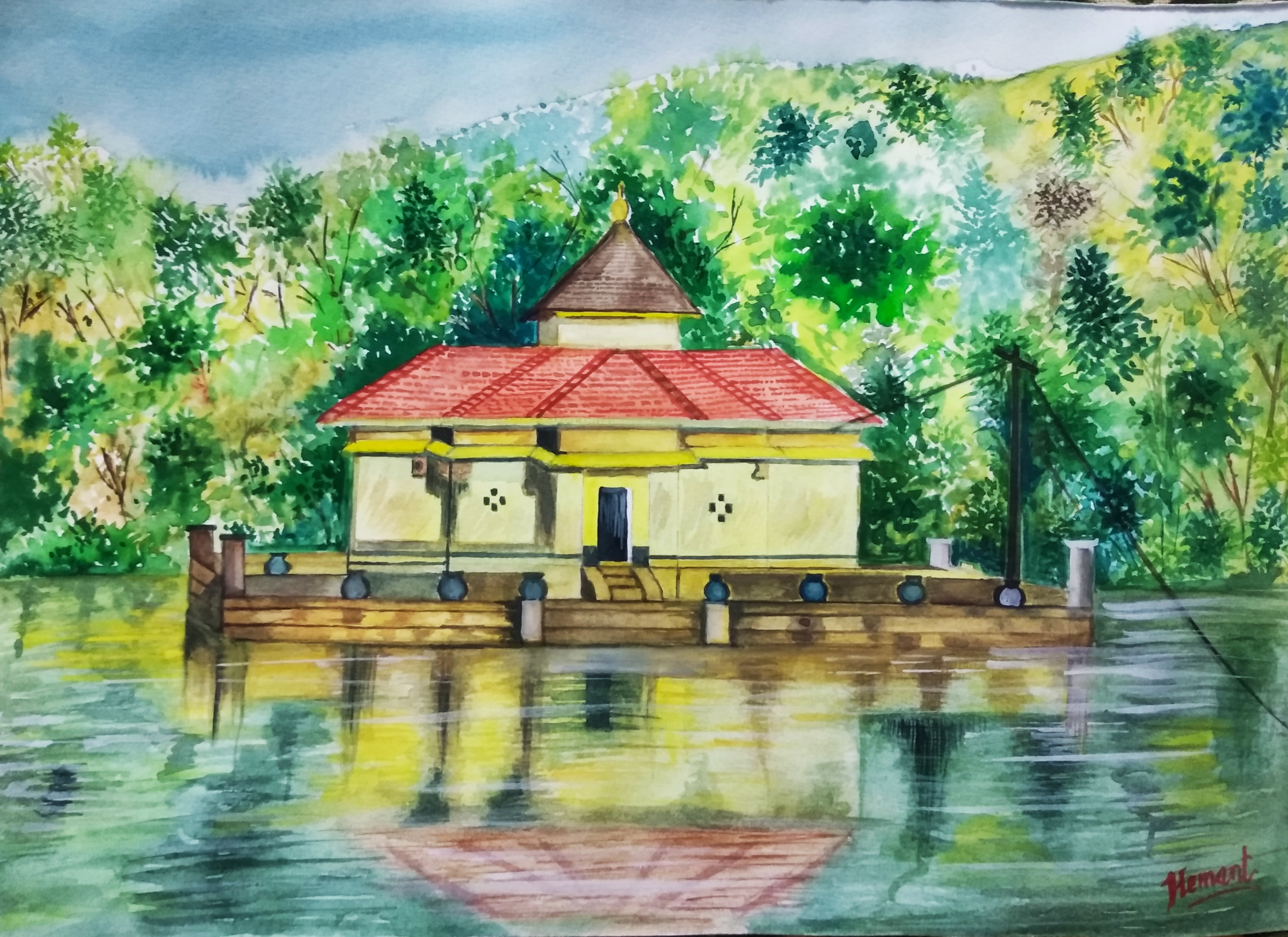
Watercolor Painting of Kere Basadi, Varanga.

== See also ==
- Karkala
- Shravanabelagola
- Jainism in Karnataka
