= Halingali =

ಹಳಿಂಗಳಿ
- village
- Location in Karnataka, India ಹಳಿಂಗಳಿ (India)
- Coordinates: 16.5064°N 75.0892°E
- Country: India
- State: Karnataka
- District: Bagalkot
- Talukas: Jamkhandi

Population (2001)
  - Total: 6,628

Languages
  - Official: Kannada
- Time zone: UTC+5:30 (IST)

Halingali is a village in the southern state of Karnataka, India. It is located in the Jamkhandi taluk of Bagalkot district in Karnataka.

== Demographics ==
As of 2001 India census, Halingali had a population of 6628 with 3482 males and 3146 females.

== Bhadragiri, Digambar Jain Basadis ==
Bhadragiri Betta comprising hillocks spread across fifty-eight acres of land in the tiny hamlet of Halingali.

It is considered a holy place by the Jain community, Basadis have sprung up in the hillocks which attract thousands of pilgrims from across the state.

The head of the pilgrimage centre, Muni Sri 108 Kularatnabhushan Sagar Ji Maharaj has built an Mahavira Jal Temple on a lake here that resembles the Jal Mandir in Pawapuri of Bihar, dedicated to Lord Mahavia.

== See also ==
- Bagalkot
- Districts of Karnataka
