= Hadavalli =

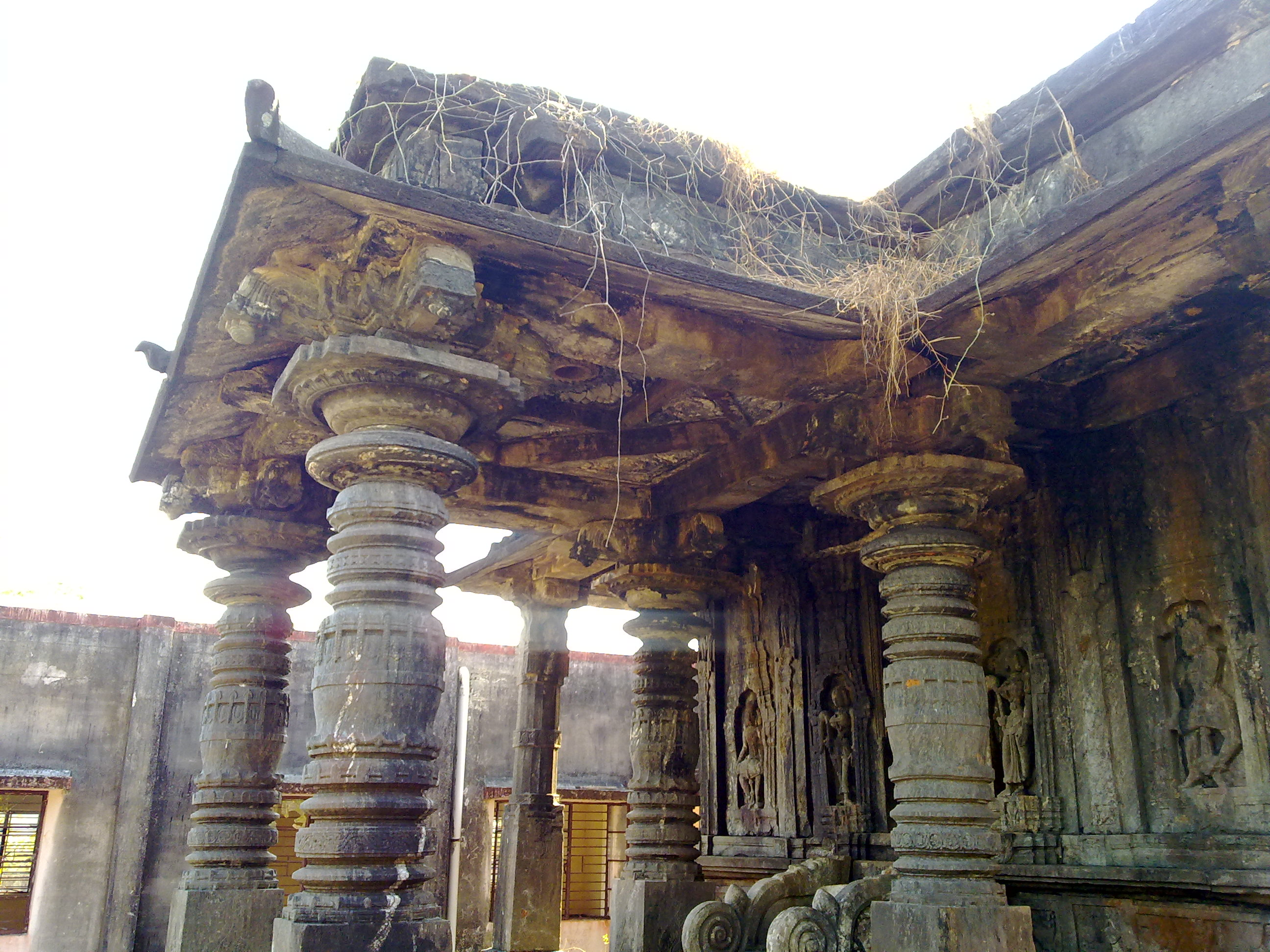
- Chandranatha Swami basadi, Hadavalli

Religion
- Affiliation: Jainism
- Deity: Adinatha
- Festival: Mahavir Jayanti

Location
- Location: Hadavalli, Uttara Kannada, Karnataka
- Interactive map of Hadavalli
- Coordinates: 14°01′53.0″N 74°38′07.2″E

Architecture
- Established: 14th century AD

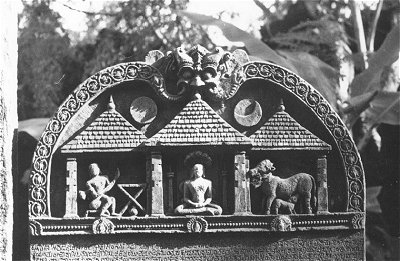

Hadavalli is a small village, situated about 17 km from Bhatkala in Uttara Kannada district of Karnataka, India.

== History ==
Hadavalli, which finds its name in history as Sangeetapura, was once believed to be an abode for musicians and also a center for art and architecture.

== Nature ==
There a number of Jain Basadi in Hadavalli. The basadis are housed in the Chandragiri and Indragiri hills that stand facing each other. It is said about these hills that the tatwapada (songs of principles), which used to be sung on Chandragiri, were interpreted by the scholars sitting on top of Indragiri. A special sound system like that of a dome was said to have been constructed on the hill for the same. Indragiri has two footprints inscribed on stone and on Chandragiri is a small basadi with no shrine.

== Temples ==
Though it is said that several basadis existed in the area, there are very few which have overcome the onslaught of time. Among them, the Chandranath basadi stands out as a prominent one. As the name itself suggests, the Chandranath basadi has a statue of Jain Teerthankara, Chandranath. The architecture of the place dates back to the 14th century when it was said to be the capital of Saluva dynasty.

Said to be built in the Vijayanagara Empire style, the Chandranath basadi is supported by 24 pillars, with the doors and pillars inside containing detailed carvings.

There are many other basadis adjacent to Chandranath basadi such as Parshwanath and Neminath basadi, besides the Padmavati temple. The statues of 24 teerthankara have been displayed at the renovated Padmavathi temple.

The Padmavati temple remains in possession of a family which has statues of twenty four Thirthankaras. They are carved in black polished stone, each over half a meter tall. All the statues have inscriptions wrought in very small letters. The temple looks like a house from outside. Regular puja (worship) takes place every day.

It is also said that 132 statues, which were taken from here for an exhibition in Belgaum, were never returned. Nobody now knows where these statues are.

== See also ==
- Jainism in North Karnataka
- Jain Bunt
- Udupi
- Mangalore
- Jainism in Maharashtra
