= Gundwad =

- Village
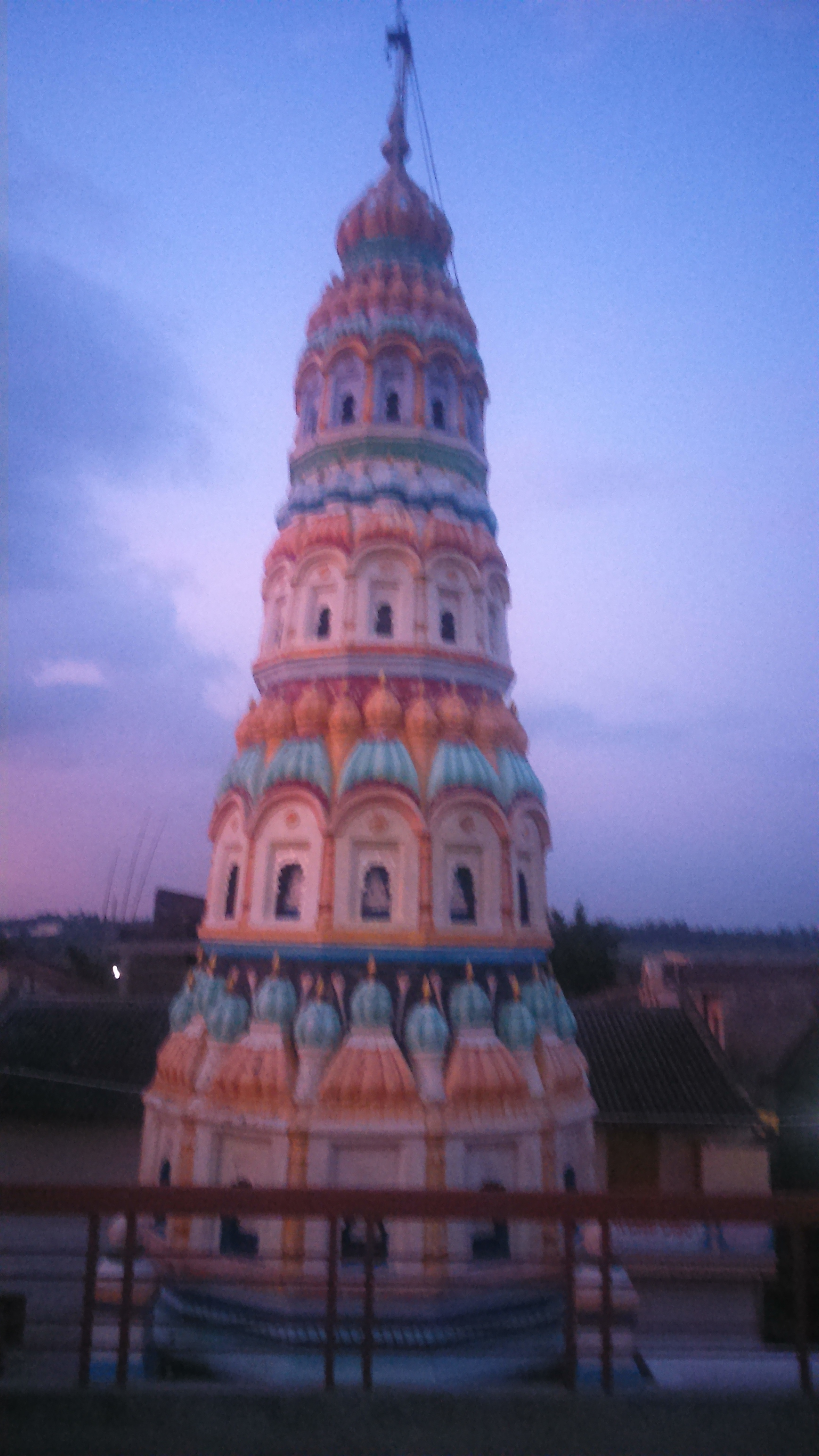
- Jain Basadi

- Location in Karnataka, India Gundwad (India)
- Coordinates: 16.645012°N 74.902912°E
- Country: India
- State: Karnataka
- District: Belgaum
- Talukas: Raybag

Government
  - Body: Gram Panchayat

Area
  - Total: 2 km^{2} (0.77 sq mi)

Languages
  - Official: Kannada
- Time zone: UTC+5:30 (IST)
- PIN: 591311
- Vehicle registration: KA 23
- Nearest city: Belgaum
- Lok Sabha constituency: Chikkodi
- Vidhan Sabha constituency: Kudachi
- Civic agency: town Panchayat

Gundwad is a village in Belgaum district in the southern state of Karnataka, India. situated on the bank of Krishna River. There is a Parshvanatha Basadi in the village which can be seen from few kilometers. Majority population in the village are Jains.The last Puncha Kalyna pooja held with lot of bhakti and enthusiasm in 2022.

== Agriculture ==
Most of the people in this village are into agriculture. Mainly they grow sugarcane and some seasonal crops like sunflower, peanuts, soya, watermelon and vegetables like brinjal, onions, and tomato, green chilies. The Krishna river makes Gundwad a well-irrigated and fertile area.

== Climate ==
Situated in the north of Belgaum district, which lies in the elevated terrain of north-western Karnataka. Gundwad receives rainfall from both the northeast and the southwest monsoons and the wettest months are June–September. June and August have a good deal of rainfall, while the winters have very little. The coldest month is December with an average low temperature of 23.3 °C and the hottest month is may with an average high temperature of 40 °C. Winter temperatures rarely drop below 20 °C (54 °F), and summer temperatures seldom exceed 30–40 °C. The driest month is January, with 10 mm of rainfall.

India is said to be gamble with monsoon, under extreme conditions Gundwad has faced flood in the past. During extreme floods, village has been evacuated in boat as its surrounded by Krishna river. Following are the list in descending order of years where extreme flood conditions recorded in Gundwad.

- 2019 Karnataka floods
- 1914
- 2005

== Location ==
Kudachi is the nearest railway station to Gundwad which is 7.5 km away. Krishna river separates Gundwad and Ainapur, Athni. Belgaum Airport is the nearest airport.

== See also ==
- Belgaum
- Districts of Karnataka
