= Varanga =

- village
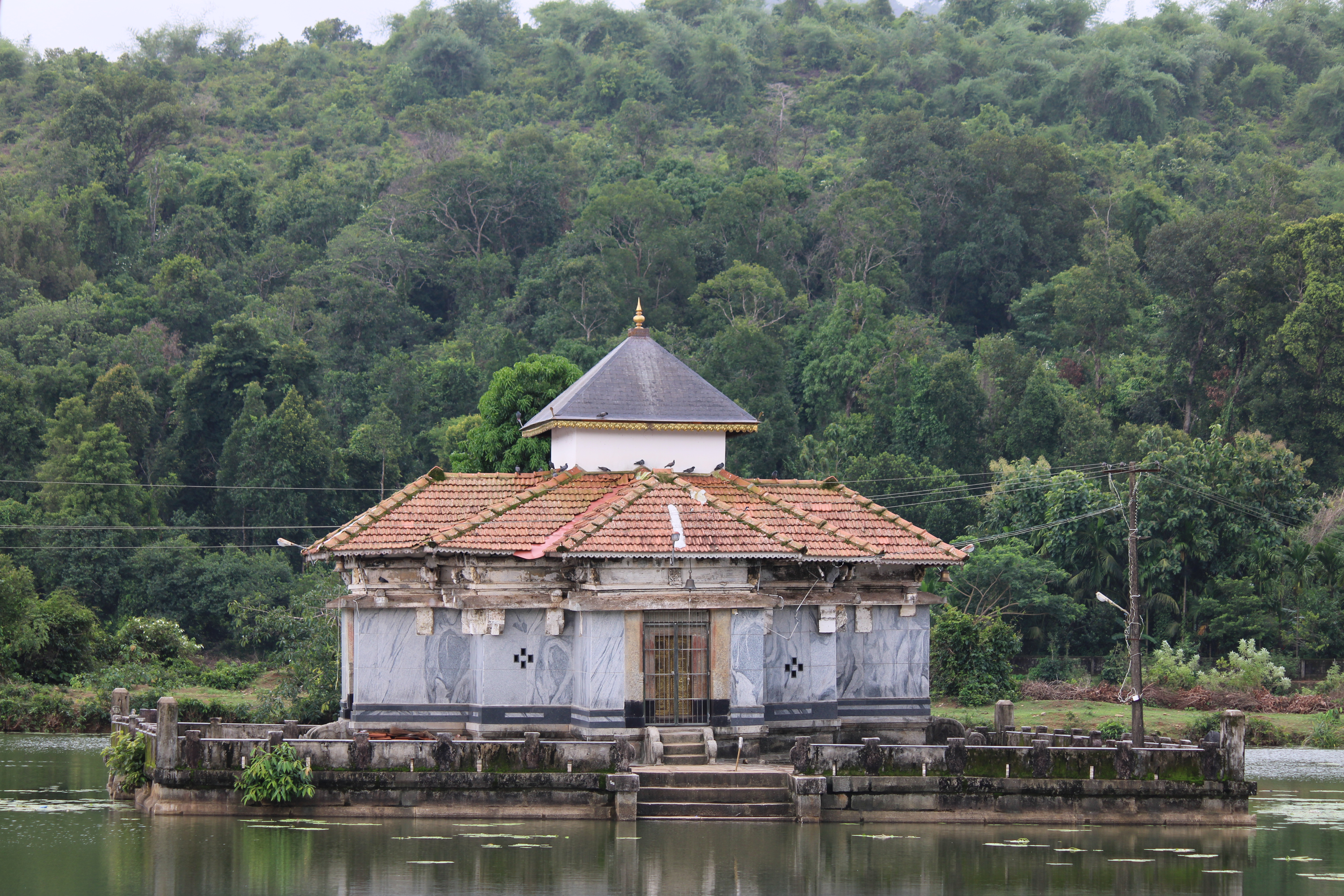
- Kere Basadi

- Location in Karnataka, India Varanga (India)
- Coordinates: 13°23′46.53″N 75°0′30.14″E
- Country: India
- State: Karnataka
- District: Udupi

Government
  - Body: Village Panchayat

Languages
  - Official: Kannada
- Time zone: UTC+5:30 (IST)

Varanga is a village in Karkala Taluk in Udupi district of Karnataka, India. According to the 2011 census, it has a population of 4,011. This village is an important Jain center.

== Tourism ==
=== Kere Basadi ===
Kere Basadi is a 12th-century temple, considered to be unique for being situated in the middle of a lake. The mulnayak of the temple is Parshvanatha, the 23rd Tirthankara. The temple is built in chaturmukha style, having four entrance and a chaturmukha idol. The temple also includes a Jain Matha.

=== Other Basadis ===
Neminatha Basadi is a stone temple built in 9th century. The shrine is 70 by 70 feet (21 m × 21 m) in dimensions with a thatched roof. The temple has a ornate torana housing an image of seated tirthankar.

The Kathale Basadi, Mathada Basadi, and Chandranath Basadi are other important temples in the region dating back 1,000 years.
