= Karkala =

Karla
- Town
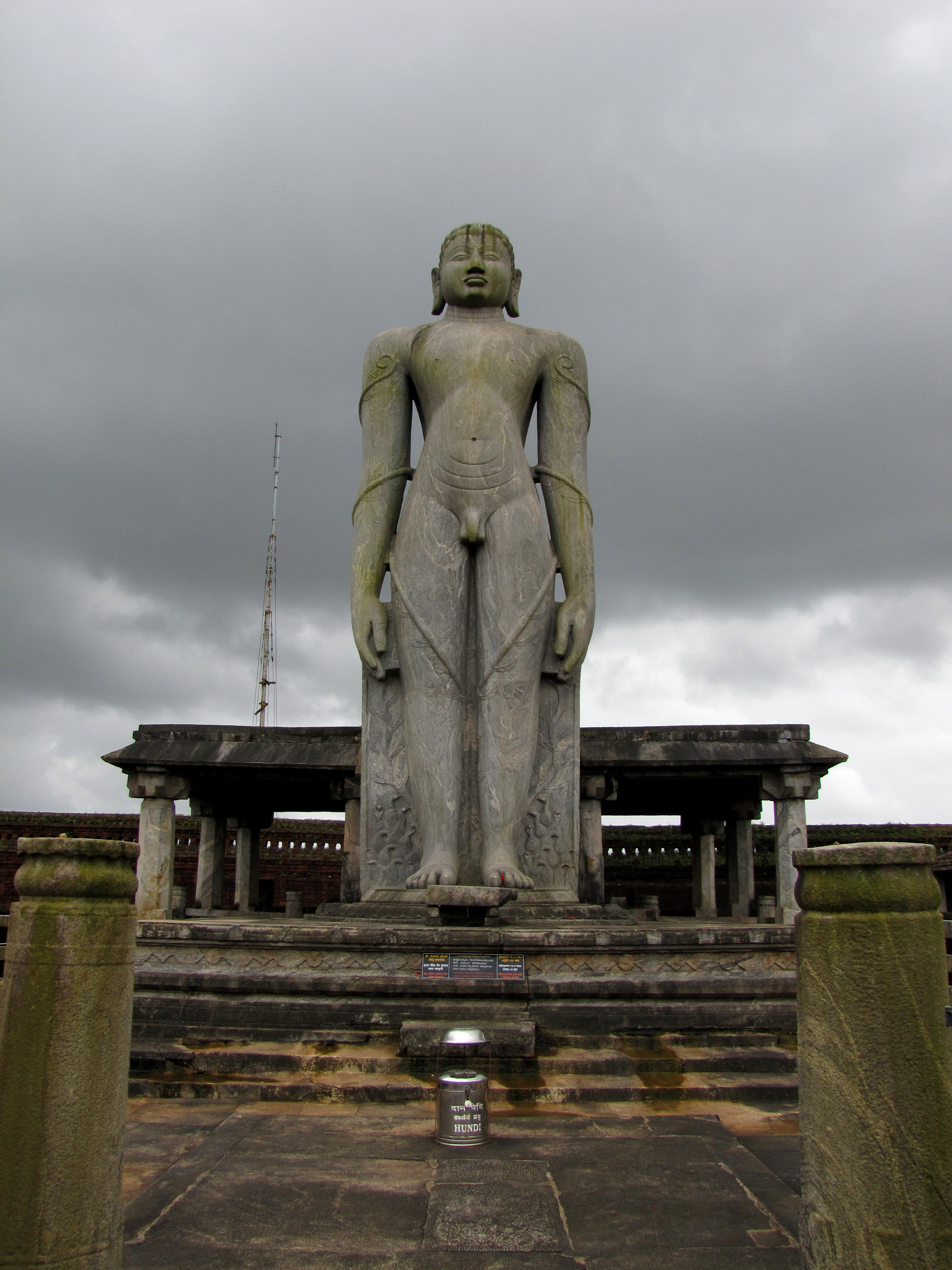
- Gommateshwar
- Nickname: Jain pilgrimage center
- Interactive map of Karla
- Coordinates: 13.2°N 74.983°E
- Country: India
- State: Karnataka
- District: Udupi
- Settled: 1912

Area
  - Total: 23.06 km^{2} (8.90 sq mi)
- Elevation: 80 m (260 ft)

Population (2011)
  - Total: 25,824
  - Density: 1,089.16/km^{2} (2,820.9/sq mi)
- Time zone: UTC+5:30 (IST)
- PIN: 574 104
- Telephone code: 91-(0)8258
- Vehicle registration: KA-20
- Official language: Kannada
- Sex ratio: 1.11 ♂/♀
- Website: www.karkalatown.mrc.gov.in

Karkala (Kannada: [kɑːɾkəɭə]) (Tulu: [kɑːɾlə]) is a town and the headquarters of eponymous Karkala taluk in the Udupi district of Karnataka state in India. It is well known as an important center of Jainism, with several ancient basadis (Jain temples) and the iconic 42-foot monolithic statue of Bahubali (Gommateshwara) dating back to the 15th century. Karkala lies near the foothills of the Western Ghats, and has a number of natural and historical landmarks, and is a major tourist and transit destination due to its strategic location along the way to Hebri, Sringeri, Kalasa, Horanadu, Udupi, Kollur, Subrahmanya and Dharmasthala.

== Etymology ==
Black granite is abundant in the area, and used widely in the local architecture. Hence, the name of the town is derived from kari-kal, meaning black stone. There is still a place called as Kariya Kall in the city which means 'Black Rock' in Tulu and Kannada languages. The name 'Kariya Kall/ ಕರಿಯಕಲ್ಲ್ changed to 'Karikal/ಕರಿಕಲ್' and eventually to 'Karkal/ಕರ್ಕಲ್/ಕಾರ್ಕಳ್'. However, some studies assert that the original name was 'Kari Kola' meaning 'elephant lake' in Tulu and Kannada languages, which today is known as 'Anekere'. The current official name "Karkala" is in use since the times of the British, while it is still referred to as "Karla" by the local Tulu population.

== History ==
Karkala dates back to the beginning of the 10th century. The town was called Pandya Nagari during the period of Jain rule.

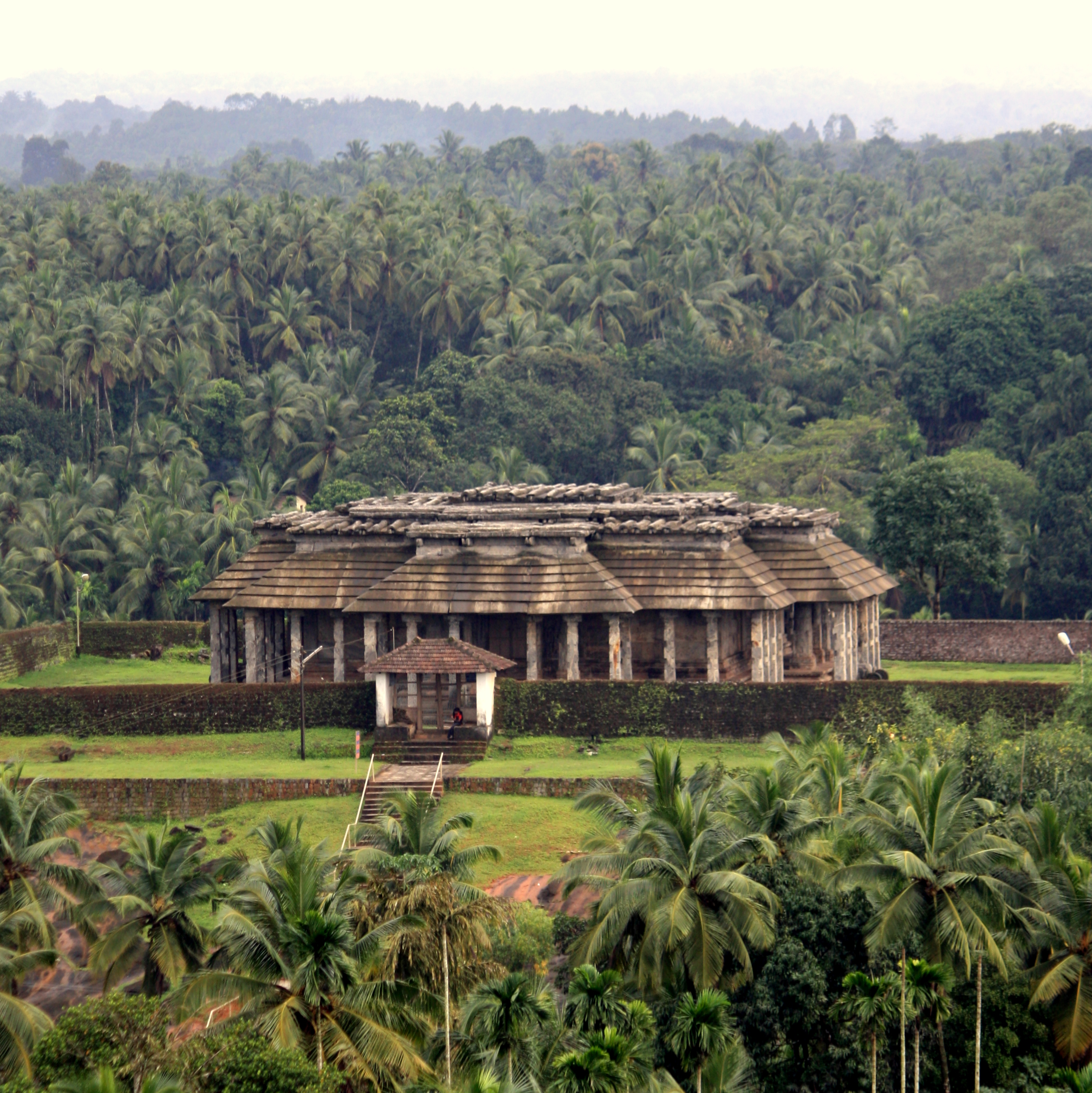
Chaturmukha Basadi

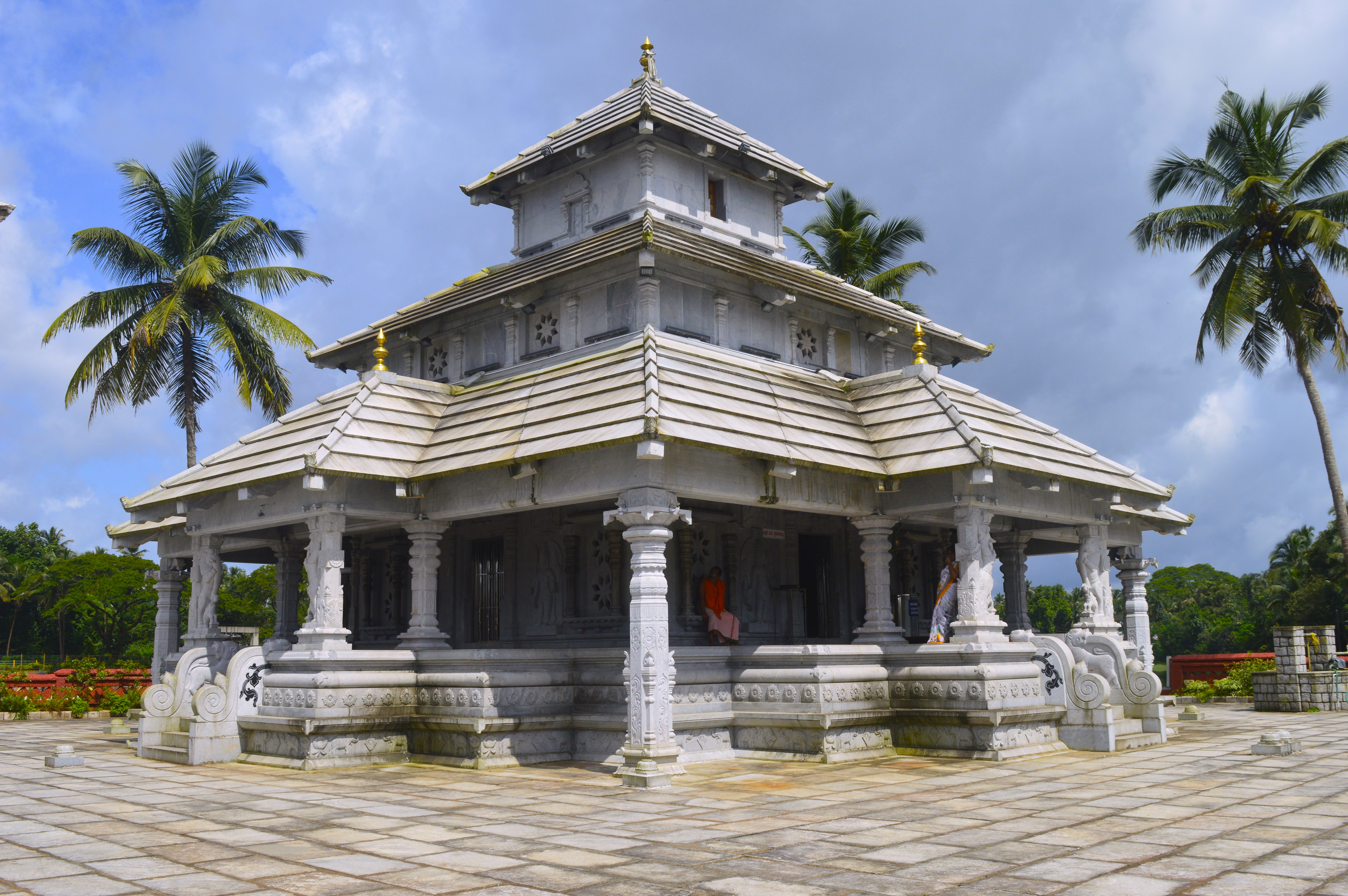
Kere Basadi

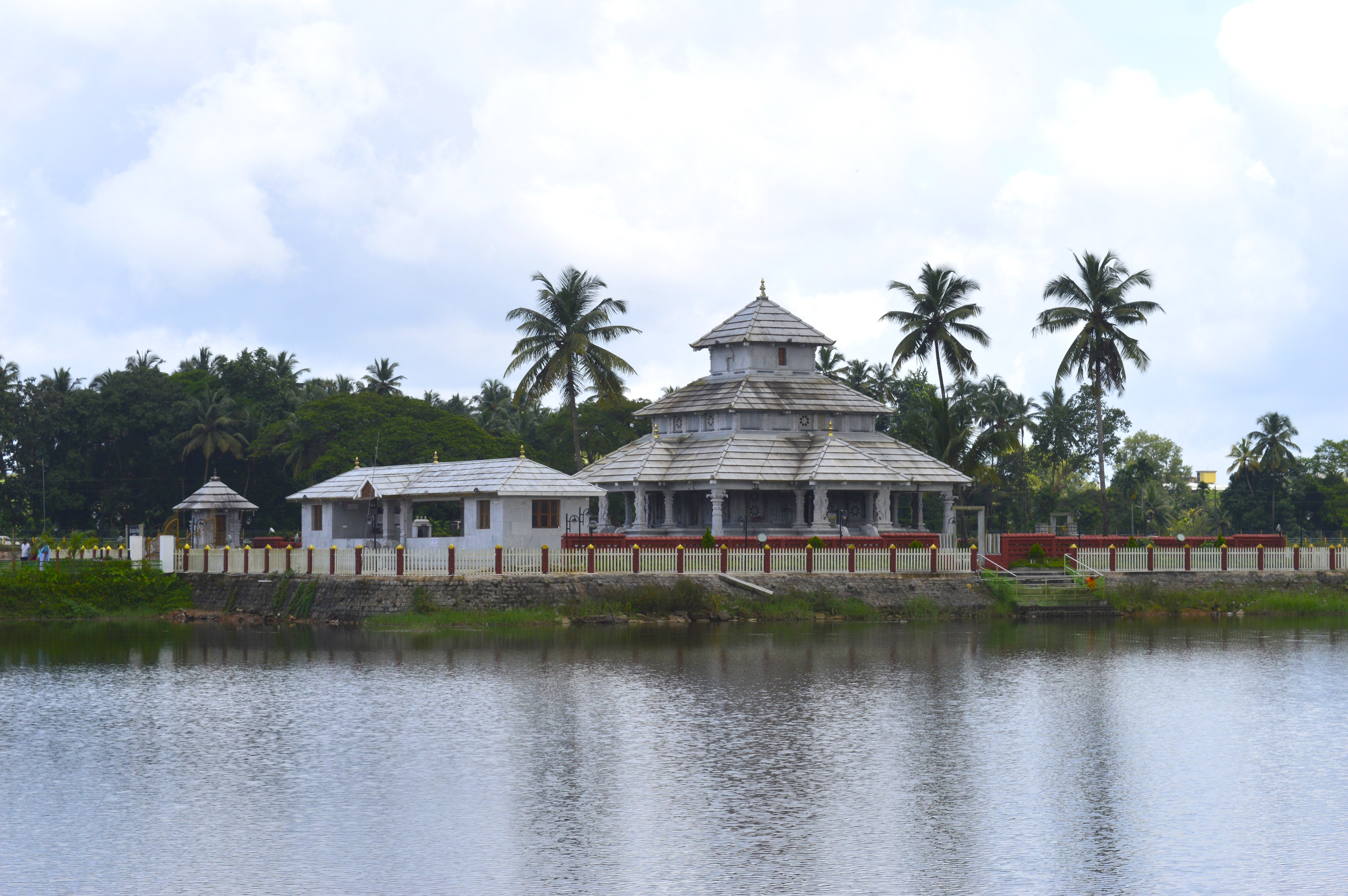
Anekere kere basadi (transl. Elephant lake, Lake Temple

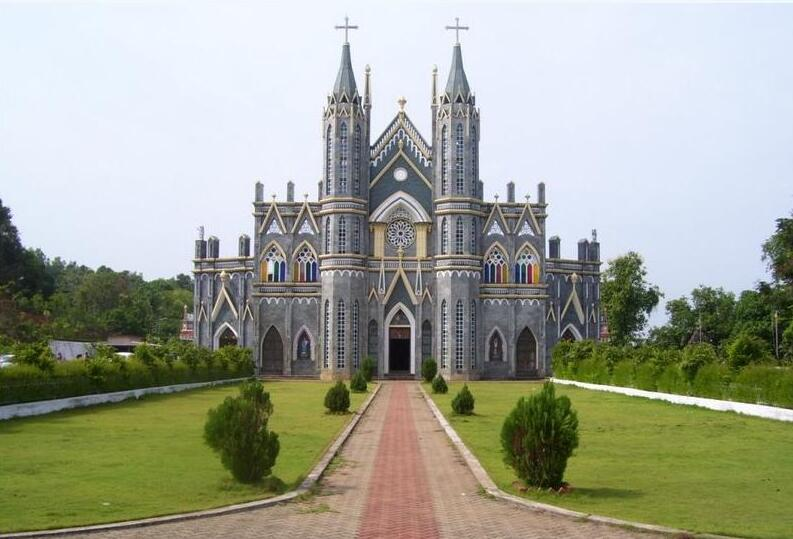
St. Lawrence Shrine Basilica

The Alupas were the first to rule the region who were Originally Jain rulers, and their rule was followed by the Santaras, who were the feudatories of Alupas for many years. The town attained political and cultural importance from the time of the Kalasa-Karkala kingdom that was established by King Bhairava between 13th and 16th centuries.

The royal family of Karkala rose to prominence from the time of the rule of the Hoysalas. During the Vijayanagara period this family reached new heights of glory as their kingdom extended over a wider area comprising Sringeri, Koppa, Balehonnur and Mudigere in Chikamagalur and most of the Karkala taluk.

King Veera Bhairava constructed the basadis at Karkala and endowed land and money to numerous temples and basadis. Ramanatha and Veerapandya were his two sons and Ramanatha died early during his father's time. So in his memory, a scenic lake called Ramasamudra was created, which still survives to this day.

King Veera Pandya, at the insistence of his Guru Lalitakeerti, the pontiff of Karkala Jaina Math, installed a large statue of Bahubali on the rocky hill of Karkala. The date of the installation has been ascertained as 13 February 1432. He also installed the Brahmadeva Pillar in front of the statue in 1436. His successor, Abinava Pandya installed a carving of manastambha in front of the Neminatha Basadis in Hiriyangadi in 1457 AD. An intricately carved 54-foot-high (16 m) pillar stands in front of the Basadis.

Abhinava Pandya's successor was Pandya VI, who is attributed to the construction of the Kere Basadis in the middle of a lake called Anekere in 1545 AD. Immadi Bhairava (Bhairava II), who ruled after him, constructed the Chaturmukha Basadi on top of a small rocky hill in 1586 AD. This Basadis has four identical entrances from the four directions leading to the Garbagriha and hence is popularly known as Chaturmukha or Four-Faced. It is also referred to as Tribhuvana Tilaka Jina Chaityalaya and Ratnaraya Dhama in some inscriptions. The Chaturmukha Basadi is built in the form of a square hall with a lofty doorway and pillared porticos on each of its four sides along with a pillared verandah. The roof is flat and is made of massive granite slabs. It has life size statues of three Jain Theerthankaras on each side and small images of 24 Tirthankara. In all, there are 108 pillars inside and outside the temple.

There are 18 Basadis of antiquity, including Mahaveera Basadi, Chandranathaswamy Basadi, Adinathaswamy Basadi, Ananthanatha Basadi, Guru Basadi, and Padmavati Basadi. However, the rulers of Karkala were tolerant towards other religions, with temples of other religions being constructed, including the temples of Anantashayana and Venkataramana, Mahamaya Mukhyaprana, and Sri Aadi-Shakthi Veerabhadra Swamy.

After the rule of the Pandyas, the region was annexed by Tippu Sultan, and thereafter passed on to British rule. The St Lawrence Church was built in 1845 in a village called Nitte (Attur hamlet) where people of all religions congregate every year in January for the feast of St Lawrence.

== Landmarks ==
Karkala is an important pilgrimage location for Jains. There are several Hindu temples, Jain Basadis, mosques, churches, and lakes in Karkala.

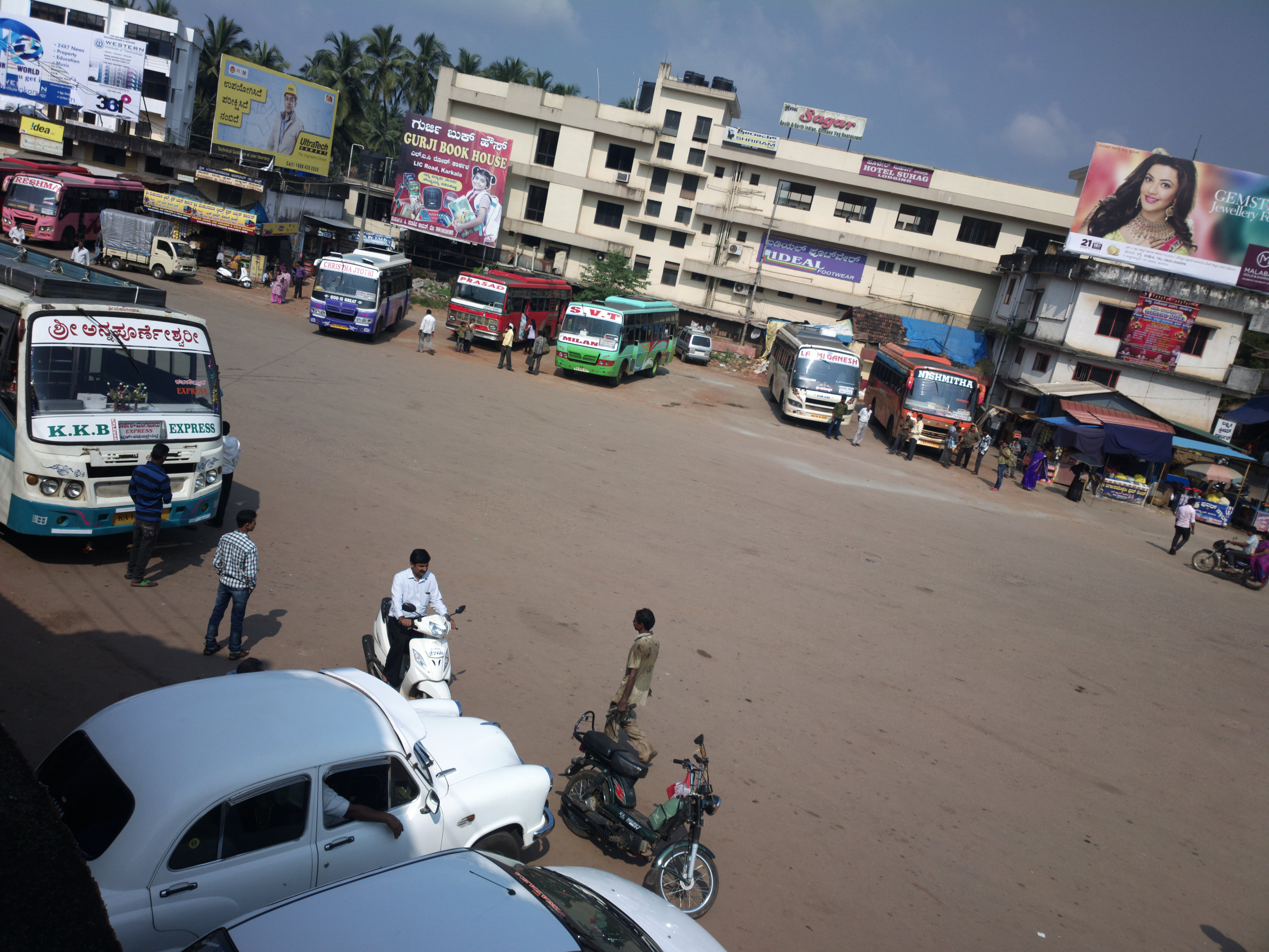
Bus stand, Karkala

Karkala has famous educational institutions like NITTE College, Bhuvanendra College, Christ King Educational institutions, and Jnanasudha Educational College.

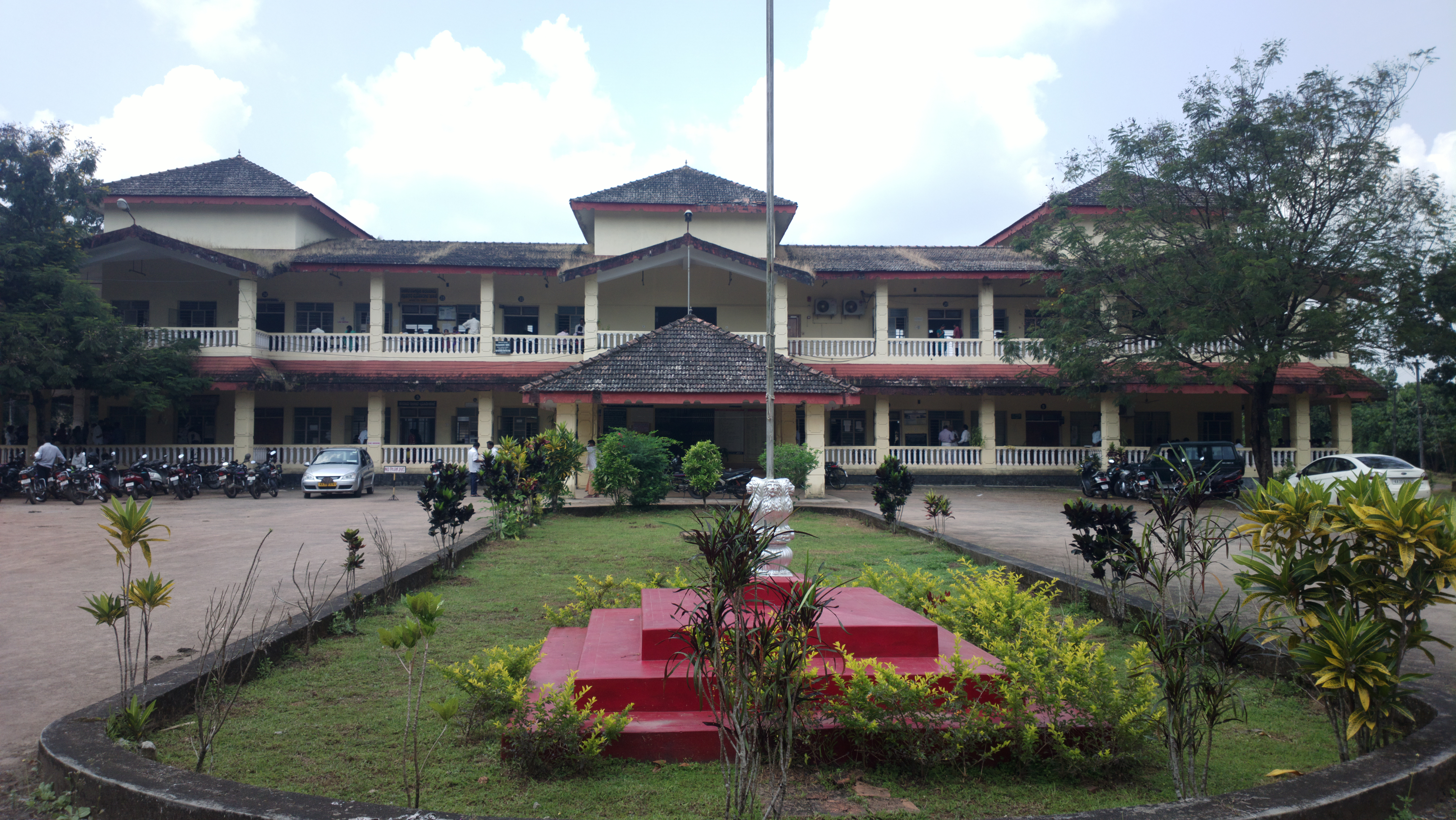
Taluk Office, Karkala

ASI protected sites in Karkala are:

- Ananthapadmanabha Temple, Ananthashayana
- Chaturmukha Basadi
- Gommateshwara Statue
- Manasthamba
- Hiriyangadi
- Sri Venkataramana Temple, Karkala
- St. Lawrence Shrine
- Parashurama Theme Park, Karkala

== Geography ==
Karla is located at 13.2°N 74.98°E. It has an average elevation of 81 metres (265 feet).

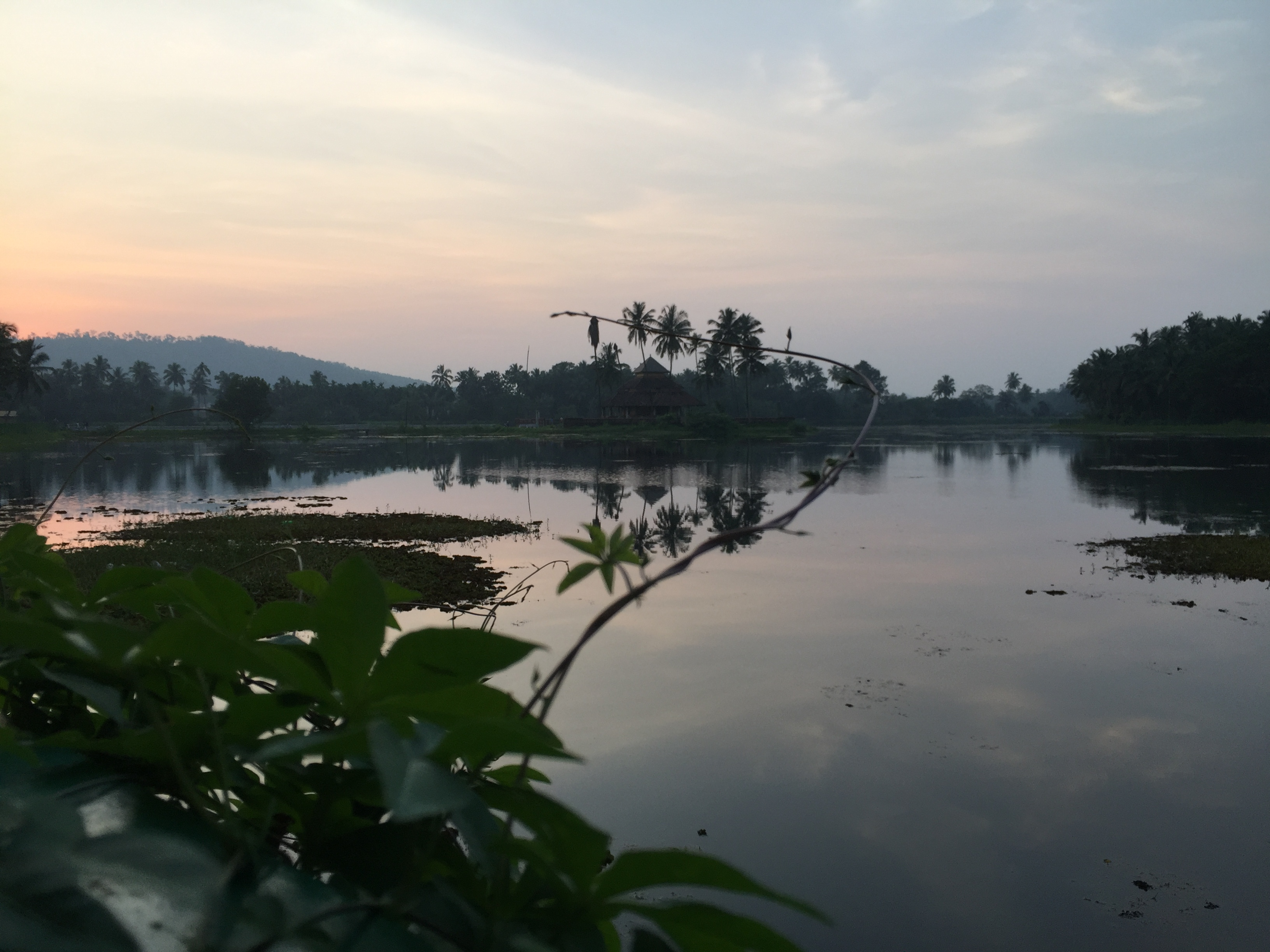
Anekere Lake, Karkala

It has a large number of picturesque lakes, such as:

- Ramasamudra Lake,
- Kamala Kere,
- NagarBavi,
- Anekere,
- Sigadi Kere,
- Matadha Kere,
- Shivathi Kere
- Jogina Kere.

Situated at the foothills of the Western Ghats, Karkala has an undulating landscape, dotted with black granite outcrops, while the western part of the town is predominantly coastal plains that stretch about 25 km west towards the Arabian Sea.

=== Meteorological details ===
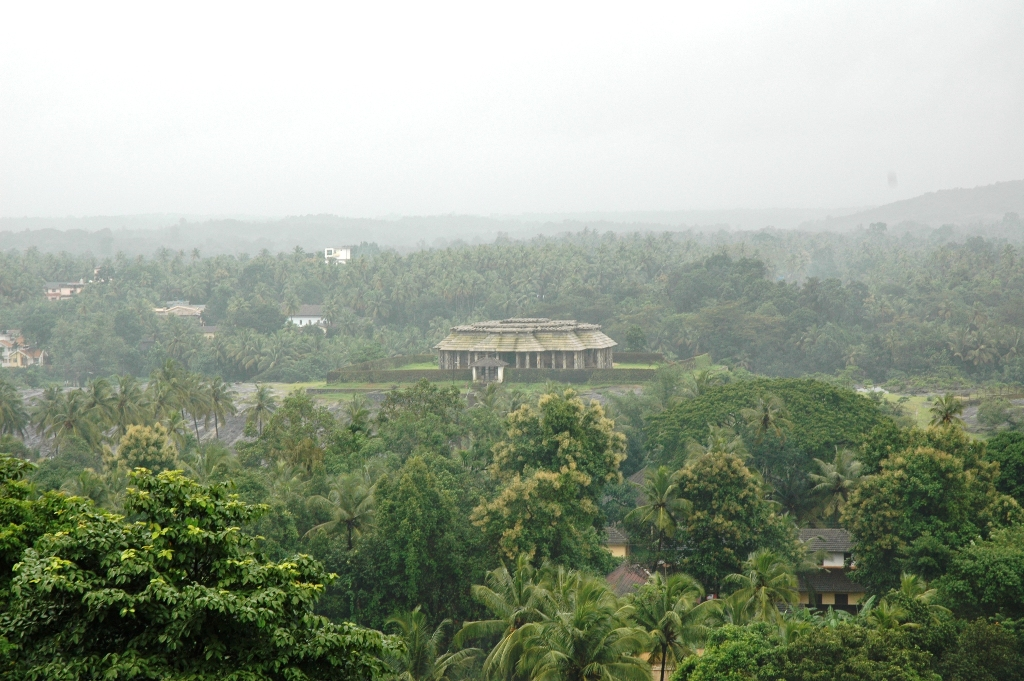
Karkala scenic view (Chaturmukha Jain Basadi)

Climate data for Karkala, India (Karkala)
Month	Jan	Feb	Mar	Apr	May	Jun	Jul	Aug	Sep	Oct	Nov	Dec	Year
Record high °C (°F)	38 (100)	38 (100)	42 (108)	41 (106)	41 (106)	37 (99)	32 (90)	33 (91)	33 (91)	36 (97)	35 (95)	35 (95)	41 (106)
Mean daily maximum °C (°F)	31 (88)	33 (91)	34 (93)	34 (93)	34 (93)	30 (86)	28 (82)	28 (82)	30 (86)	30 (86)	31 (88)	30 (86)	34 (93)
Mean daily minimum °C (°F)	22 (72)	24 (75)	26 (79)	28 (82)	28 (82)	27 (81)	26 (79)	25 (77)	25 (77)	25 (77)	24 (75)	22 (72)	22 (72)
Record low °C (°F)	17 (63)	16 (61)	19 (66)	23 (73)	23 (73)	23 (73)	23 (73)	23 (73)	20 (68)	20 (68)	18 (64)	17 (63)	16 (61)
Average rainfall mm (inches)	9 (0.4)	9 (0.4)	19 (0.7)	39 (1.5)	99 (3.9)	663 (26.1)	629 (24.8)	288 (11.3)	153 (6.0)	133 (5.2)	57 (2.2)	19 (0.7)	2,117 (83.3)
Source: MSN Weather

== Demographics ==
Religion in Moodabidri (2011)
1. Hinduism (76.5%)
2. Islam (14.9%)
3. Christianity (5.87%)
4. Jainism (2.60%)
5. Sikhism (0.03%)
6. Buddhism (0.02%)
7. Other or not stated (0.08%)

As of 2001 India census, Karkala town had a population of 25,118. Males constitute 51% of the population and females 49%. Karkala has an average literacy rate of 82%, higher than the national average of 59.5%: male literacy is 85%, and female literacy is 79%. In Karkala, 9% of the population is under six years of age. According to recent statistics by town municipality, 25,635 people currently reside in this town, while as per the recent statistics Karkala taluk has a population of 2.10 Lacs (previous 2001 census is 2,04,571).

Hinduism is the largest religion in Karkala, with Sthanika Brahmins, Rama kshathriya, Bunts, Sapaliga/Sapalya, Billavas, Ganigas, Rajapura Saraswat Brahmins (RSB), Goud Saraswat Brahmins (GSBs), Chitpavan Brahmins, Shivalli Brahmins, Vishwakarma Brahmins, Devadiga and Mogaveera forming the major communities. There is also a significant Roman Catholic and Protestant Christian presence, and Deobandi Hanafi Muslim communities settled in the town, Muslims of Dakhini Karkala Speak Urdu as their mother tongue.

== Culture and tradition ==
The people of Karkala follow the Tuluva culture. Distinctive features of this culture include rituals of Bhuta Kola, Nagaradhane and Yakshagana. Tuluva New Year is called Bisu.

Pilinalike or Tiger Dance is a unique form of folk dance in Tulu Nadu. The tiger is considered as the mount of Goddess Durga, and the dance is performed during the Dasara and Krishna Janmashthami festivals. Bhuta Kola or spirit worship is practised across the region, usually at night, invoking the spirits via an oracle, accompanied by traditional music and practices.

The most popular local sport is Kambula, or buffalo racing, which is conducted in paddy fields. Koridakatta (Cockfighting) is another sport for village people. The Tuluva people have a high regard for nature and snakes in particular, so Nagaradhane, or snake worship, is also practised with the belief that the Naga Devatha (Snake God) will protect their communities.

== Language ==
Karkala is a multilingual town. Tulu is the native language of the people, while the official language is Kannada. Konkani and Dakhni are also widely spoken in the town.

== Administration and transportation ==
Being a part of Udupi district, Karkala is in the Udupi-Chikkamagalur Lok Sabha Constituency.The Karkala Town Municipal Council (ಕಾರ್ಕಳ ಪುರಸಭೆ) is the municipal corporation of the town, responsible for all public works and development.

Roadways are the main mode of transportation in Karkala. The town is well connected to Udupi, Moodabidri and Padubidri, and to Sringeri and Kalasa on the Western Ghats. The main roadways serving Karkala are:

- National Highway NH 169 (Solapur—Mangalore)
- Karnataka State Highway SH 1 (Karkala-Padubidri) which connects to National Highway 66 at Padubidri
- Karnataka State Highway SH 37 (Karkala-Bailur-Manipal-Udupi)
- Karnataka State Highway SH 1 (Karkala-Hebri)

The nearest railhead is at Udupi while the airport closest to Karkala is at Bajpe in Mangalore. There is an extensive public transport system connecting Karkala to Udupi and Mangalore.

== Photo gallery ==
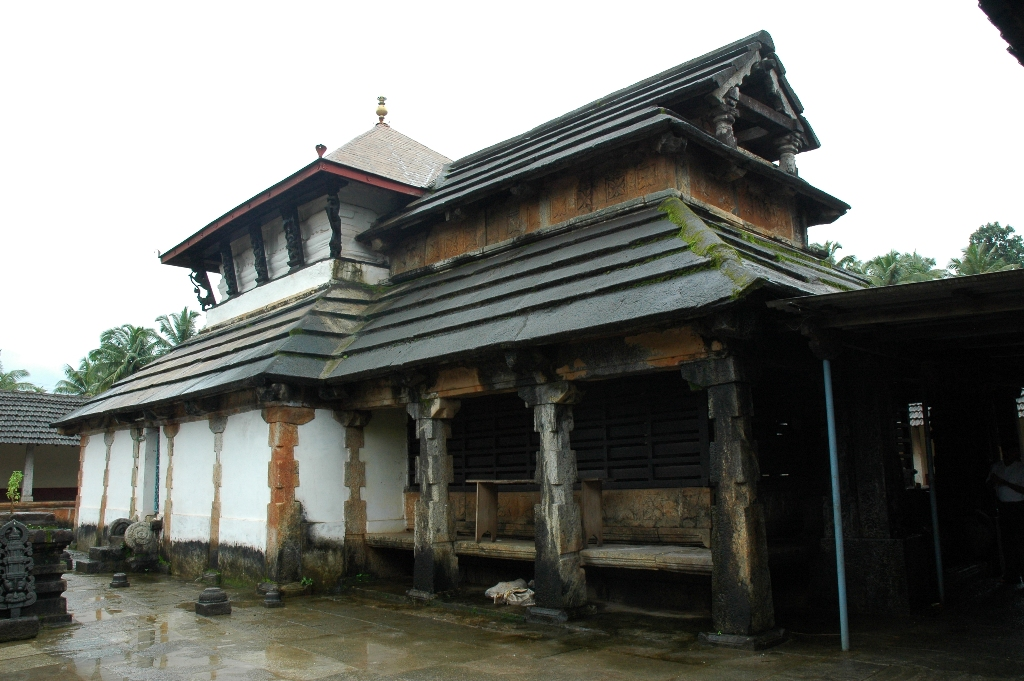
Ananthapadmanabha Temple, Karla

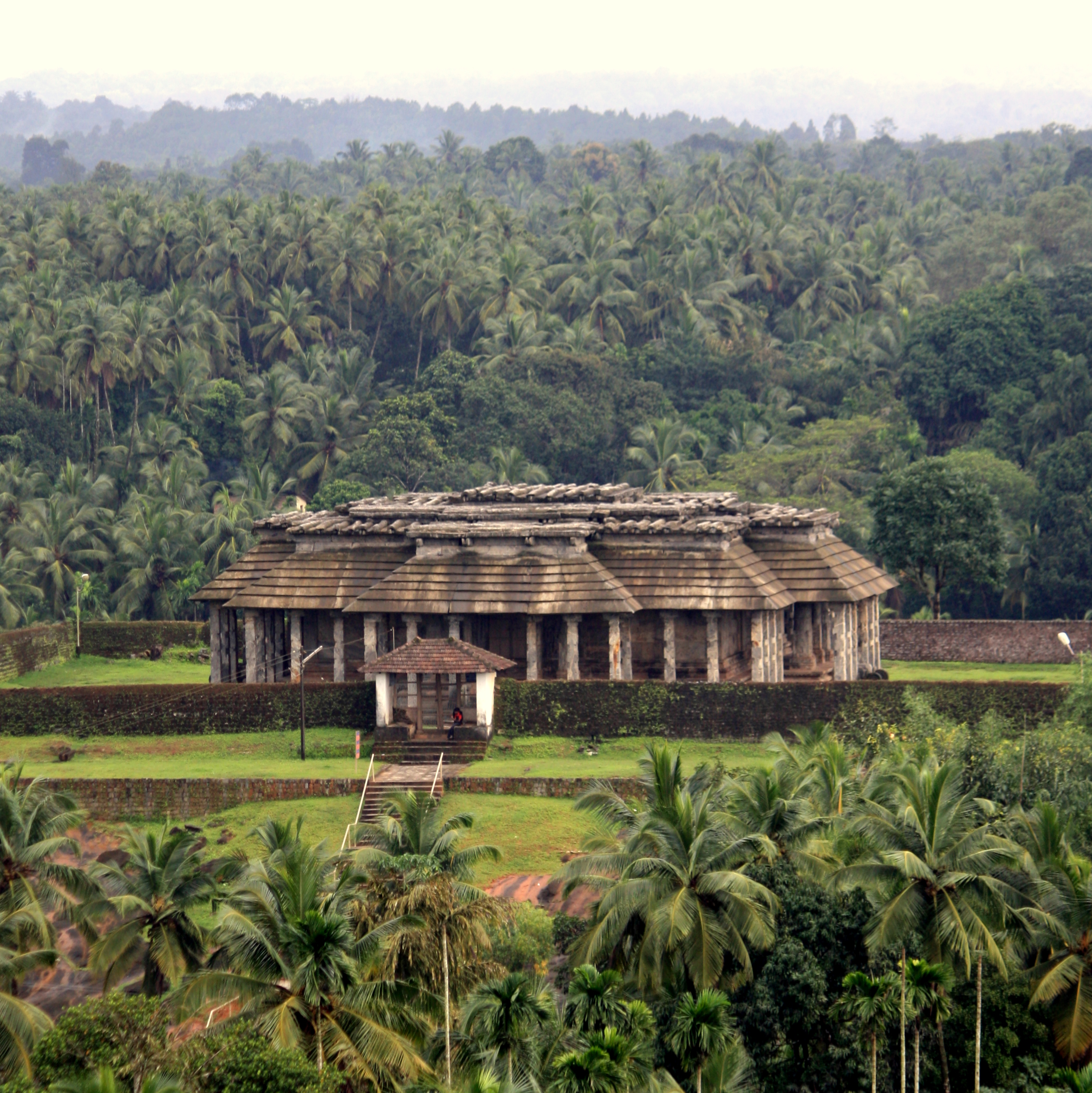
Chaturmukha Basadi

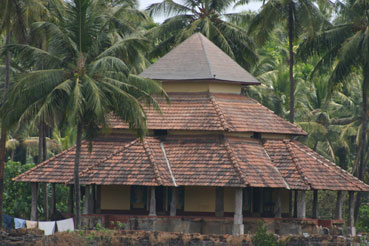
Padmavati Basadi

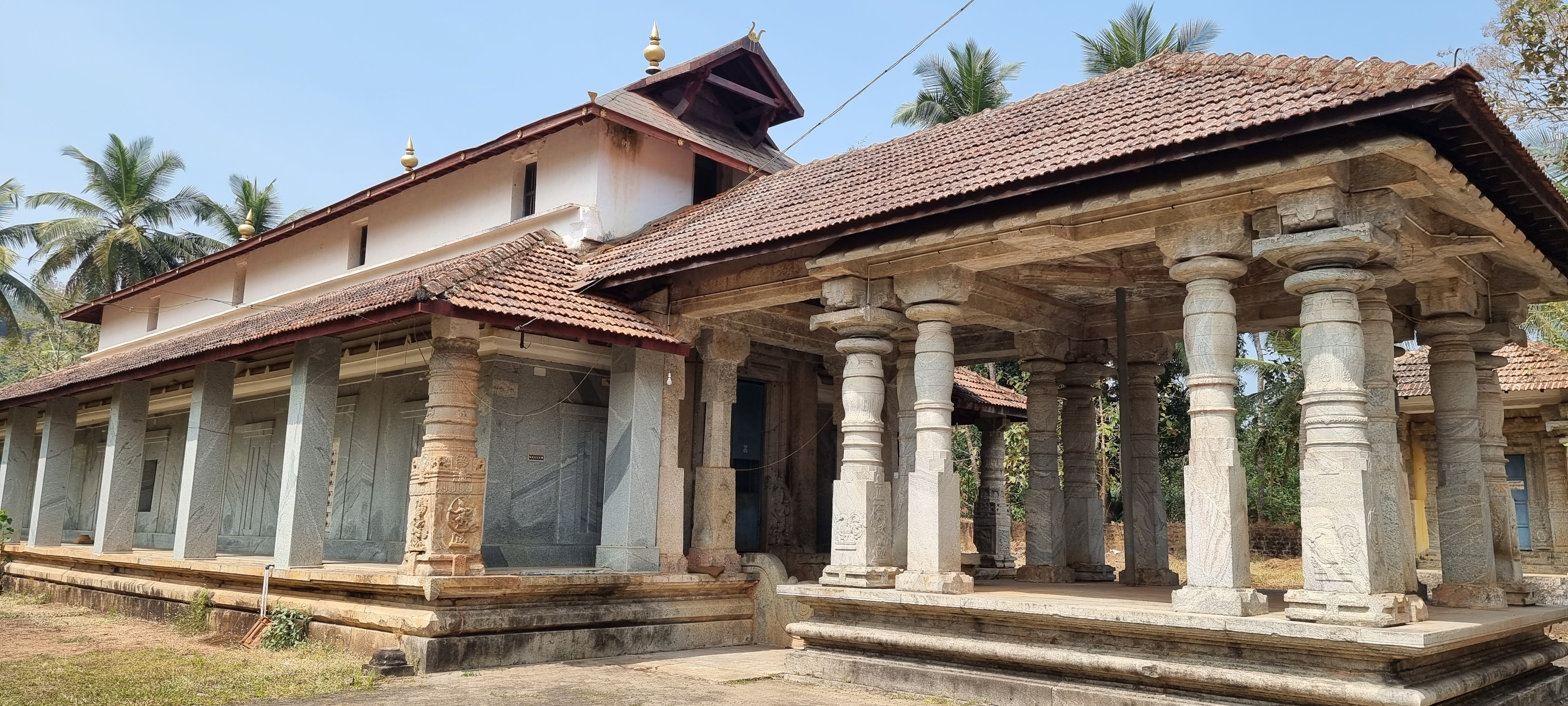
Gururaya basadi, Karkala

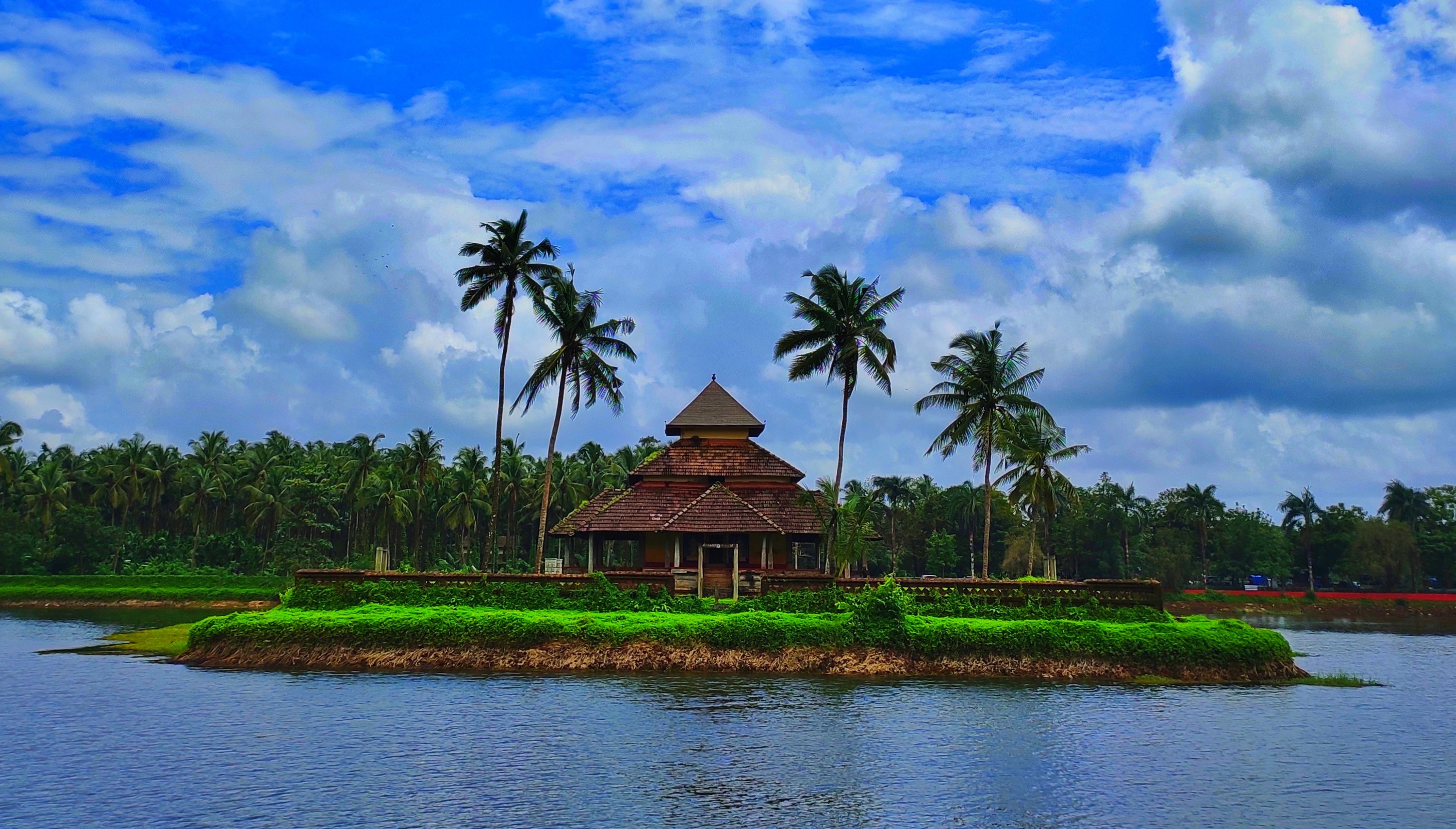
Anekere Basadi at the center of pond in Karla

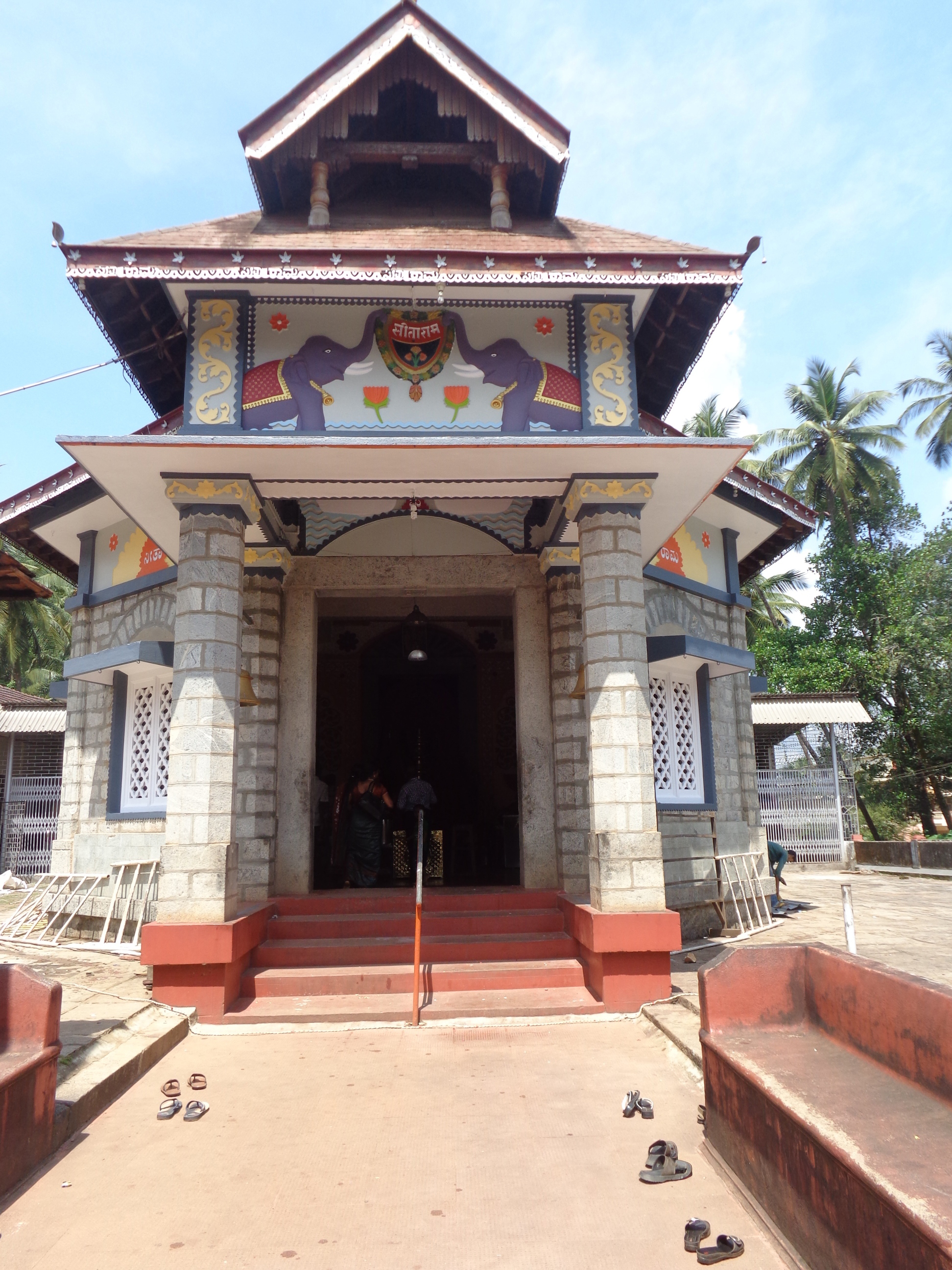
Veeramaruthi Temple, Karla

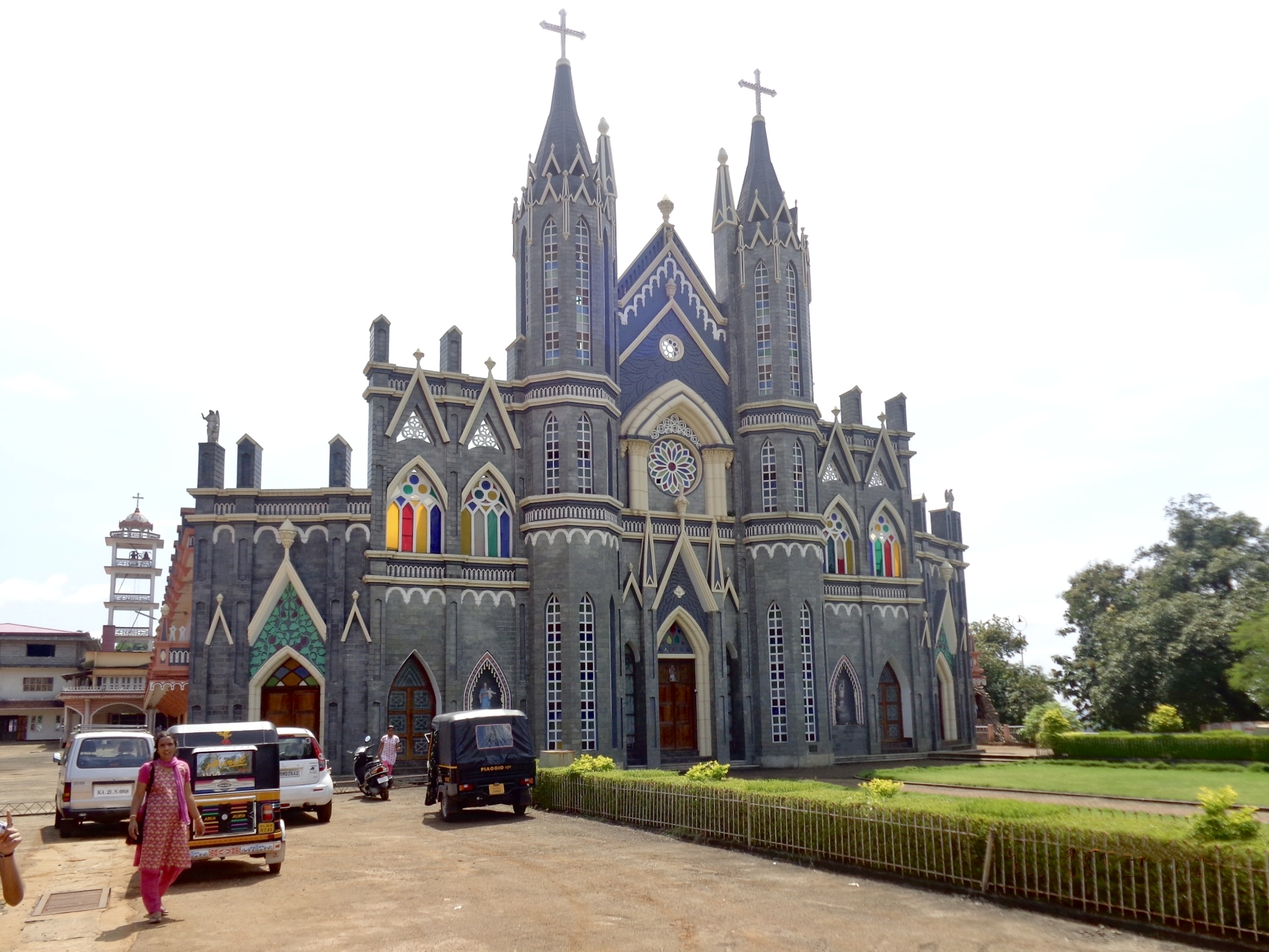
St lawrence Church, Karla

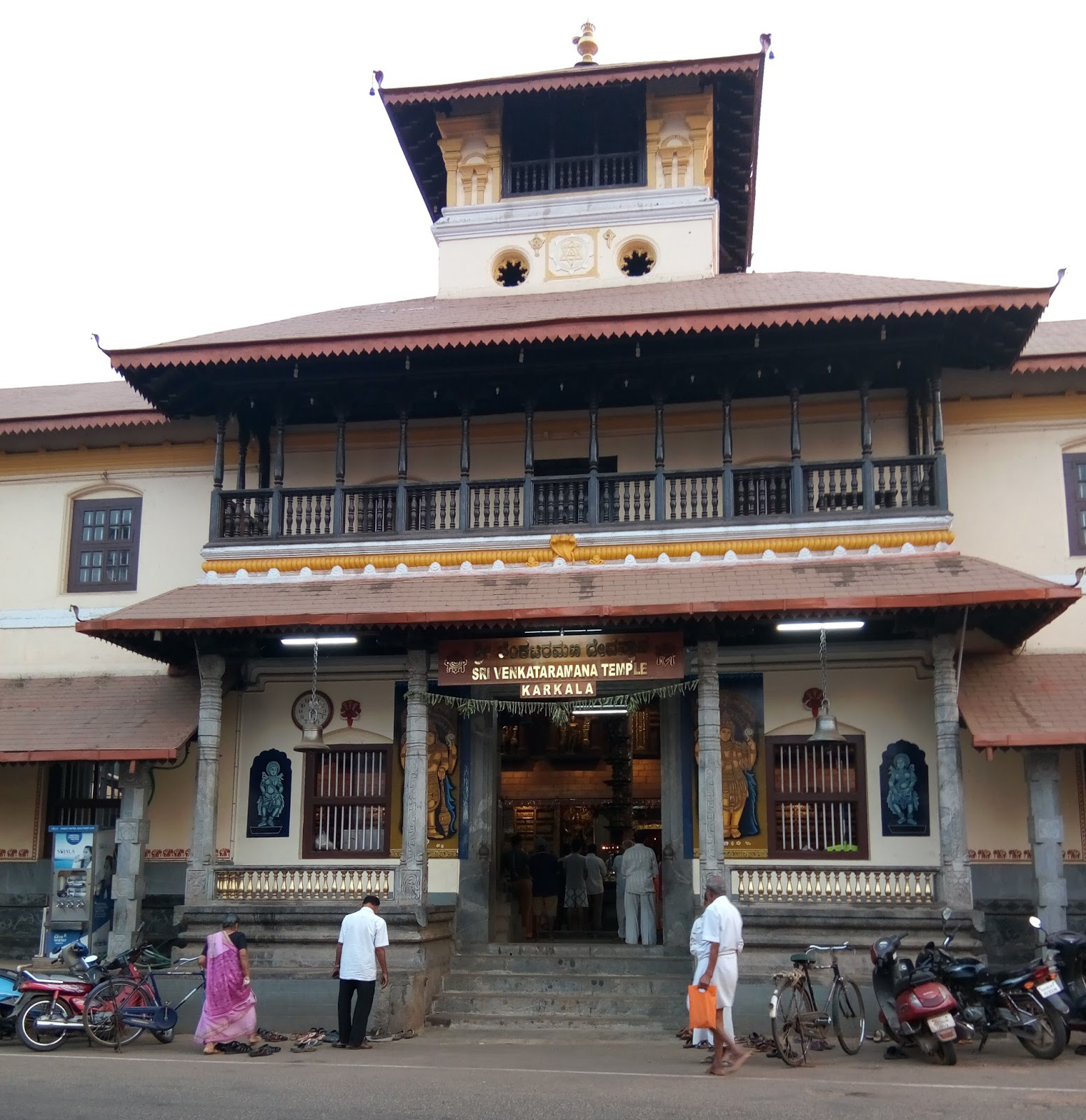
Venkataramana Temple, Karla

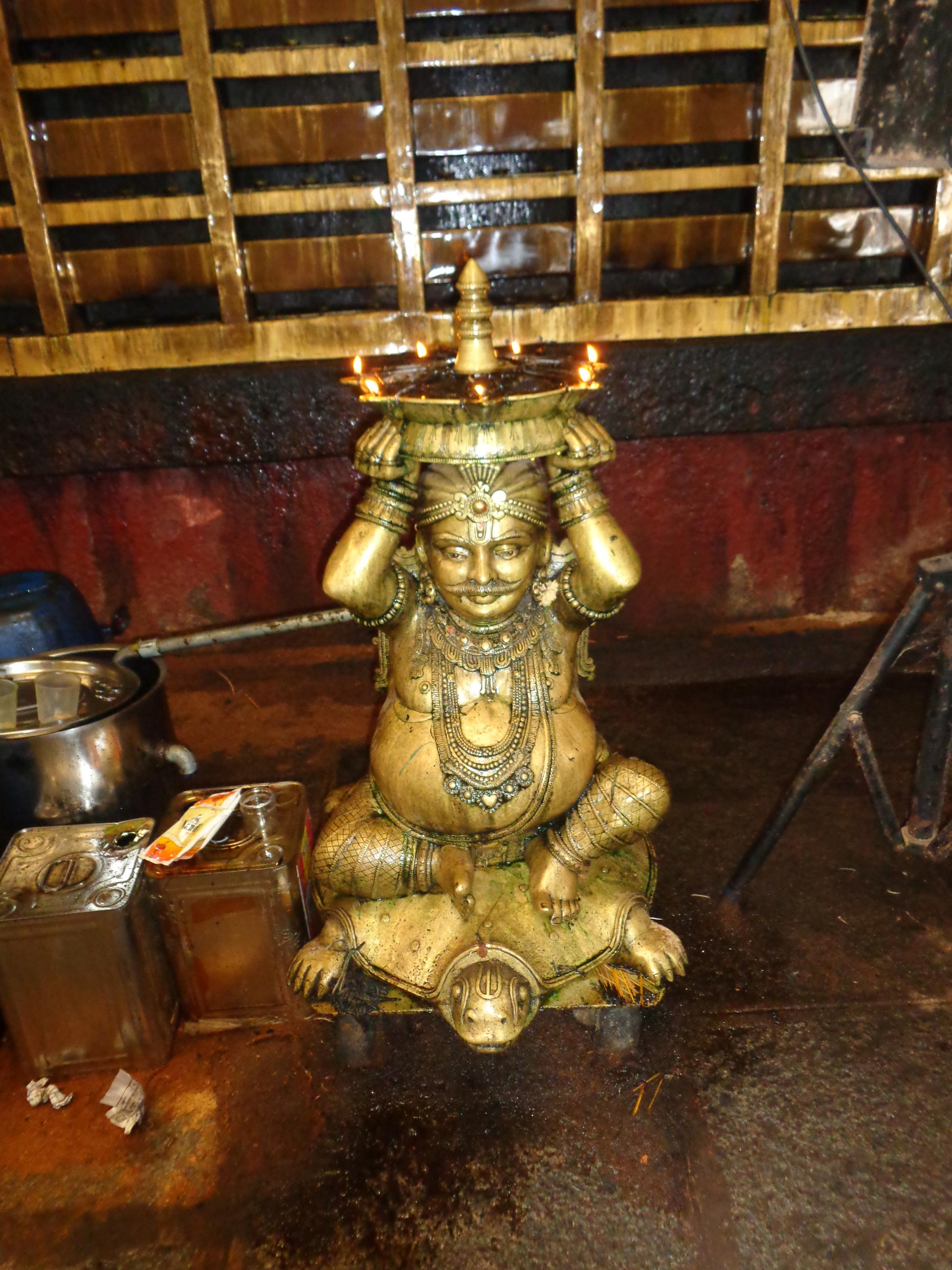
The Deepadhaari at Venkataramana Temple, Karla
