= Gommateshwara statue, Karkala =

Monolithic statue of Bahubali in Karnataka

Gommateshwara (Bahubali)
- ಗೊಮ್ಮಟೇಶ್ವರ ಪ್ರತಿಮೆ ಕಾರ್ಕಳ '
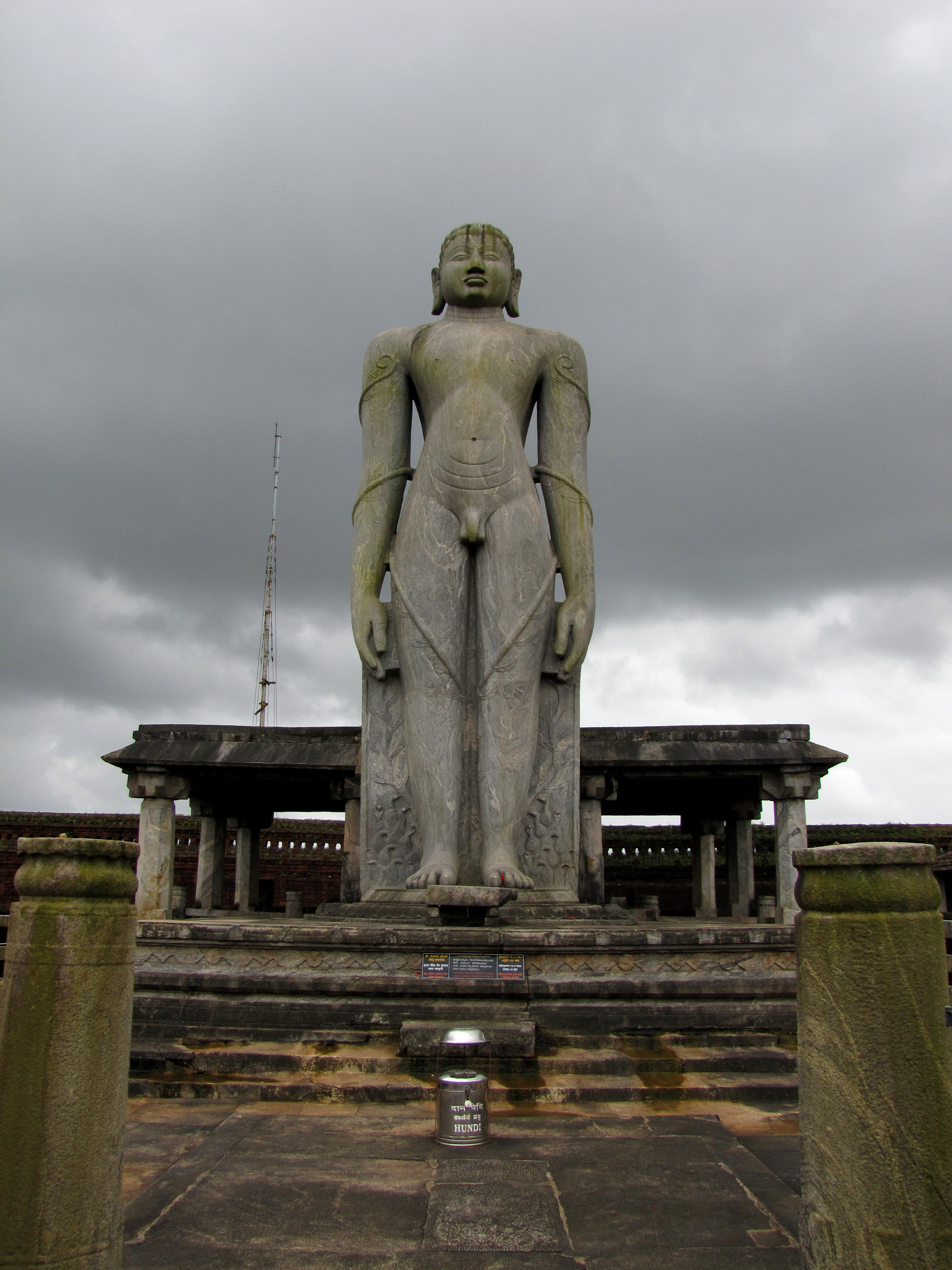
- The monolithic statue of Bahubali

- Location within India Location within Karnataka

Religion
- Affiliation: Jainism
- Deity: Bahubali
- Festivals: Mahavir Jayanti, Das Lakshana
- Governing body: Karkala Jain Math

Location
- Location: Karkala, Karnataka
- Coordinates: 13°12′13.6″N 75°00′20″E

Architecture
- Creator: Veera Pandya Bhairarasa
- Established: 1432 C.E.

Specifications
- Height (max): 42 feet (13 m)
- Temple: 18

Gommateshwara statue, Karkala (ಗೊಮ್ಮಟೇಶ್ವರ ಪ್ರತಿಮೆ ಕಾರ್ಕಳ) is located at Karkala in the Indian state of Karnataka. It is the second tallest statue of Bahubali in the world with the largest statue located at Shravanabelagola. The statue was commissioned by the local ruler Veera Pandya Bhairarasa, son of Bhairava, and was consecrated on 13 February 1432. An inscription associated with the monument records that Vira Pandya undertook the work at the prompting of the Jain preceptor Lalitakirti of the Panasoge lineage of the Desigana.

== History ==
Gommateshwara statue at Karkala was built in 1432 CE by Veera Pandya Bhairarasa' of Santara dynasty on advice from Lalitakirti, the Bhattaraka of Karkala Jain Matha. Contemporary epigraphical evidence provides a precise account of the monument's patronage. The inscription describes Vira Pandya as the son of Bhairava of the Lunar race and records that he caused the image of Bahubali to be made. The inscription further states that Vira Pandya was prompted to undertake the work by the Jain teacher Lalitakirti, who belonged to the Panasoge lineage (Panasogevali) of the Desigana. Lalitakirti was the spiritual preceptor of Vira Pandya. The consecration of the image is precisely dated by the inscription. The calendrical details were calculated by epigraphist Franz Kielhorn as corresponding to Wednesday, 13 February 1432 CE. The statue was inspired from the larger Gommateshwara statue at Shravanabelagola built in 983 CE.

'Kalkuda' was a great sculptor who built the Gommateshwara statue in Karkala. After he completed building beautiful temples and monumental statues, the ruler of Karkala cut off his left arm and right leg so that he could not create such beautiful sculptures for any other king. The story concerning Kalkuda belongs to local tradition; the inscription recording the construction and consecration of the statue names Vira Pandya and his preceptor Lalitakirti but does not identify Kalkuda as the sculptor.

Karkala Gommatesvara Charitre, composed by Chadura Chandrama in 1686 CE, is poem describing the mahamastakabhisheka at Karkala.

== Inscription ==
An inscription associated with the Gommateshwara statue provides the principal contemporary evidence for its construction. The record was published in Epigraphia Indica, volume VII. The record attributes the monument to Vira Pandya, son of Bhairava, and states that he caused the image of Bahubali to be made. It further names Lalitakirti of Panasoge as the Jain teacher who prompted the ruler to undertake the work. Lalitakirti belonged to the Panasoge lineage of the Desigana. The same name occurs in a later Karkala inscription concerning the construction of the Chaturmukha Basadi, leading the editors of Epigraphia Indica to conclude that Lalitakirti was a hereditary title borne by Jain teachers of Panasoge who served as spiritual preceptors to the chiefs of Karkala. The inscription gives calendrical information for the consecration of the image. On the basis of these details, Franz Kielhorn calculated the date as Wednesday, 13 February 1432 CE. The inscription is consequently important not only for dating the monument but also for documenting the relationship between the Jain religious establishment of Panasoge and the ruling family of Karkala during the 15th century.

== Statue ==
The idol of Lord Bahubali, carved out of a single rock of granite, is 42 feet (13 m) tall, 10.33 feet (3.15 m) wide and is said to be the second tallest statue of Bahubali in the world. The idol is placed on a 5 feet (1.5 m) pedestal and enclosed by cloistered prakaram. The monument is situated on the rocky hill known as Gommata Betta at Karkala. The statue is a free-standing monolith carved in granite and represents Bahubali in the standing meditative posture known as kayotsarga. In the entrance room, a few sculptures of Tirthankaras are displayed. In front of the temple is a manastambha with image of Yaksha within a niche. The statue is depicted in kayotsarga posture with curly hair ringlets, large ears and palms stretching up to knees. The monumental image belongs to a wider Karnataka tradition of colossal representations of Bahubali. Earlier examples include the celebrated image at Shravanabelagola, while later examples include the monolith at Venur. The idol weighs over 80 tonnes. It is located 300 feet (91 m) above sea level.

Gommateshwara statue at Shravanabelagola, Dharmasthala, Venur, Gommatagiri along with the one in Karkala are the five monolithic statues of Bahubali in Karnataka. The monolithic colossal statues of Bahubali at Shravanabelagola, Karkala and Venur are considered as wonder of the world. The Karkala monument is protected as a Monument of National Importance by the Archaeological Survey of India.

== Mahamastakabhisheka ==
Mahamastakabhisheka is organised every 12 years. As the Mahamastakabhisheka begins, consecrated water is sprinkled onto the participants by devotees carrying 1,008 specially prepared vessels (Kalashas). The statue is then bathed and anointed with libations such as milk, sugarcane juice, and saffron paste, and sprinkled with powders of sandalwood, turmeric, and vermilion. The event has been attended by multiple political personalities including D. B. Chandregowda & V. S. Ramadevi in 2002, Vajubhai Vala in 2015. The next Mahamastakabhisheka is scheduled to be held from 18 to 28 February 2027.

== Other temples ==
Neighbouring areas have 18 Jain Basadis including Chaturmukha Basadi, Karkala, and Kere Basadi, Anekere. Moodabidri is another important Jain centre near Karkala.

== See also ==
- Kumbhoj
- Statue of Ahimsa
- Navagraha Jain Temple
