= Parashurama Theme Park, Karkala =

Theme Park in Karnataka, India

Coordinates: 13.28264°N 74.93419°E

Parashurama Theme Park is a tourist destination built on Ummikkal hill in Bailur near Karkala in Udupi district. A bronze statue of Lord Vishnu's sixth avatar, Parashurama, is placed on the top of the building on the hill. This bronze statue is 33 feet tall, holding an axe in right hand, bow in left hand and raised left leg.

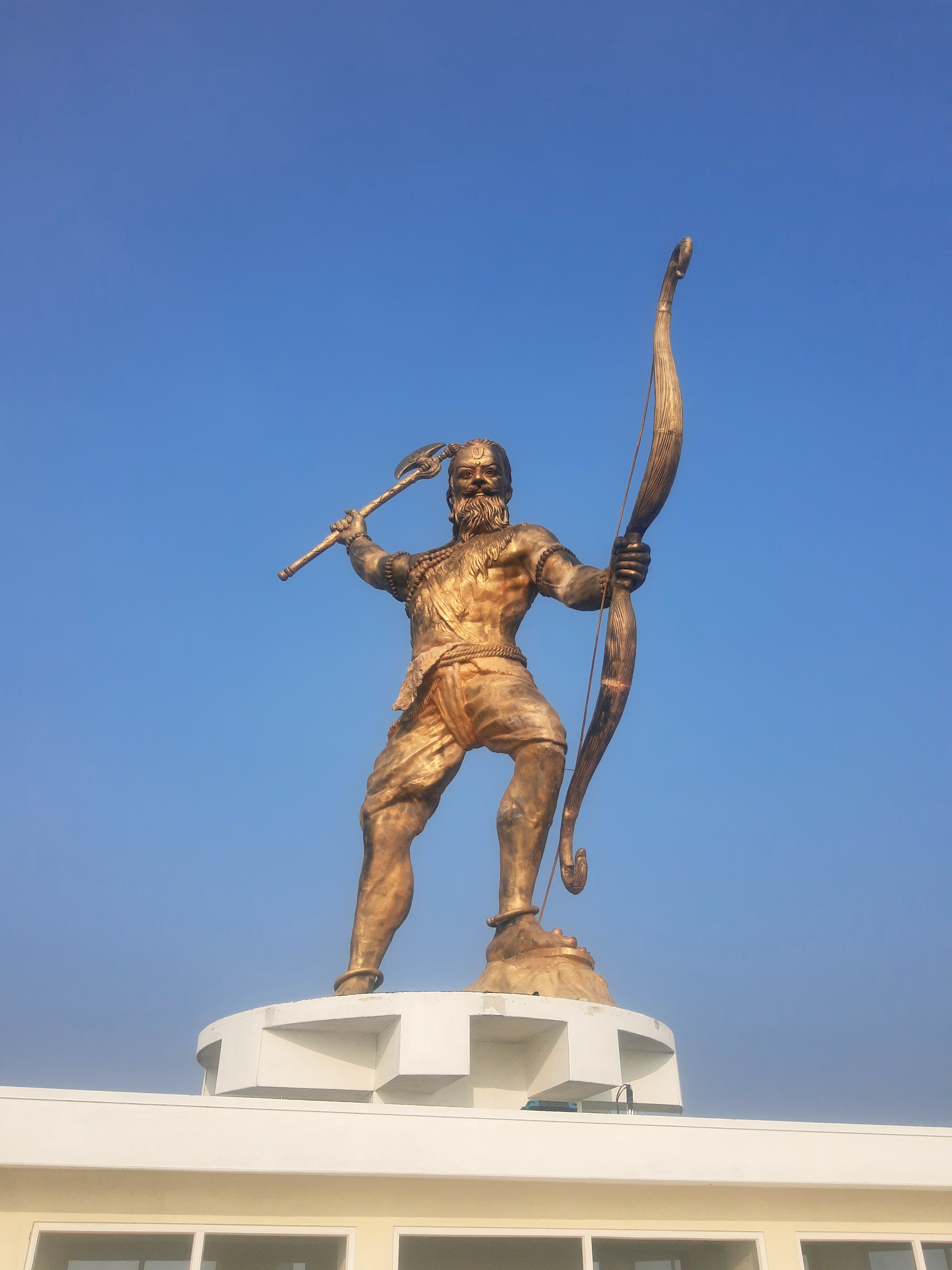
Statue of Parashurama in Parashurama Theme Park

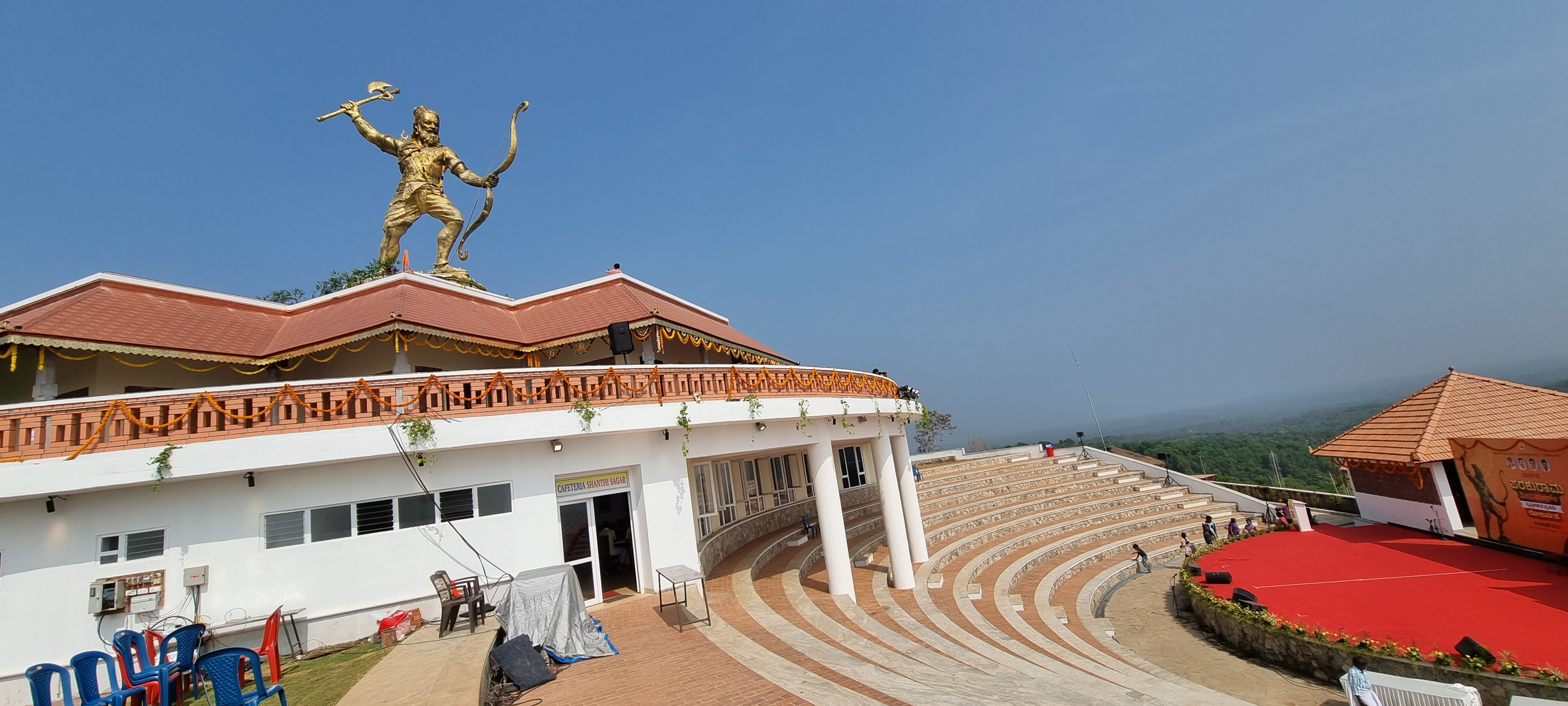

The project has been started at an estimated cost of Rs 10 core in collaboration with Department of Tourism, Kannada and Cultural and other departments. Currently the theme park has a Bhajana Mandir, modern audio -visual museum, a 509-seater amphitheatre, a viewpoint on a 450 feet hill, a hallway with mural painting of Parashurama and a restaurant added to the cultural heritage.

== Parashurama ==
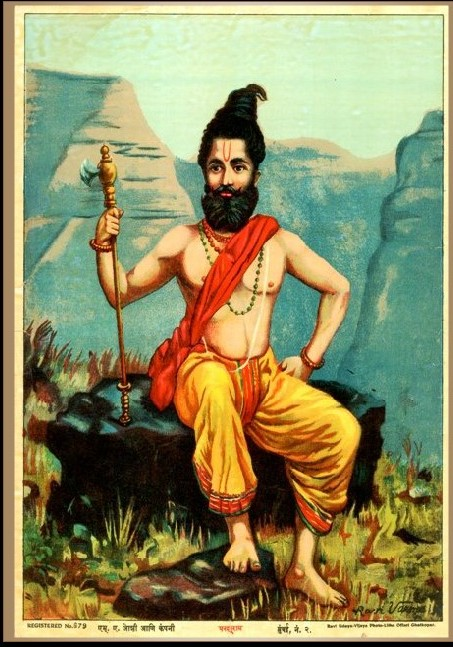

The project has been started at an estimated cost of Rs 10 crore in collaboration with Department of Tourism, Kannada and Culture and other departments and other works related to the park are in progress. Currently, the theme park has a Bhajana Mandir, a modern audio-visual museum, a 500-seater amphitheater, a viewpoint on a 450 feet hill, a hallway with mural paintings of Parashurama and a restaurant added to the cultural heritage. The statue of Parashurama installed on the hill is already attracting thousands of tourists from different parts of the country. The park has been established by Nirmithi Kendra in Udupi district.

== Plan ==
Though reputed to be the creation of Kaiuthiva Parashurama, there were no vestiges related of it. In this background, the idea of constructing a Parashurama theme park in Karkala was mooted in 2017. Not only did he propose this fact at the Coastal Bandhu's "Friendship Gathering" event in Pune, he also promised to complete the project within two years of the start of construction.

== Parashurama on the ruined mound ==
A ruined stone mound in Karkala has now got a new look. Yarlapadi Ummikal Kunja, Bailur, Karkala, Udupi, a hill of boulders, is now a hot spot for tourists. The statue of Sri Parashurama, who said to be the creator of Tulu Nadu.

== Unveiling of the bronze statue ==
An idol of Parashurama made entirely of bronze with bow and ax in hand can be seen here. Parashurama Theme Park was inaugurated on 27 January 2023. A 33 feet tall, 15 ton heavy bronze statue of Parashurama has been installed at a height of 57 feet from the ground.15 tons of bronze used for the construction of this statue of Parashurama.
