= Chaturmukha Basadi, Karkala =

Jain temple in Karkala, Karnataka, India

- ಚತುರ್ಮುಖ ಬಸದಿ
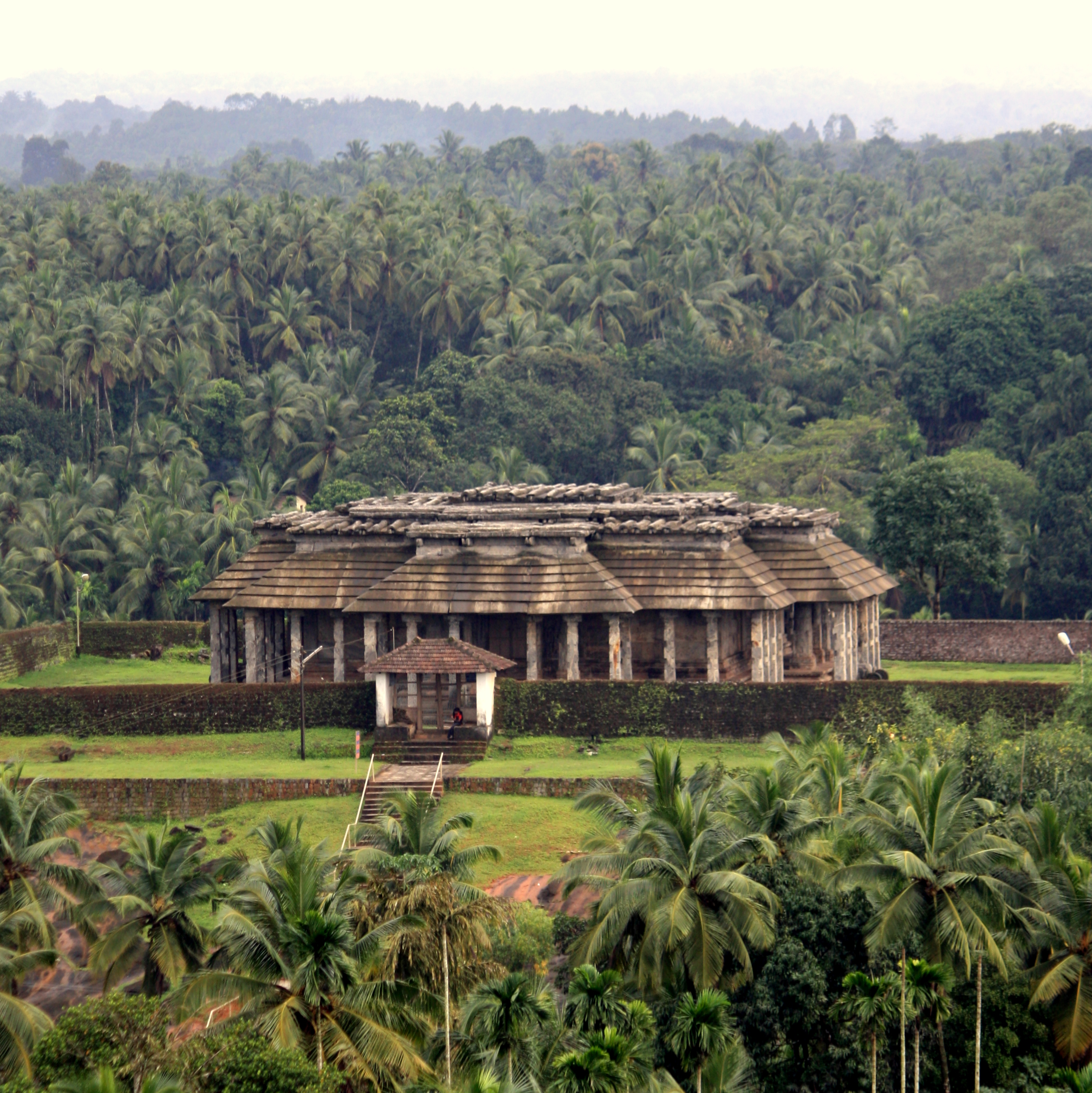
- Chaturmukha Basadi at Karkala

Religion
- Affiliation: Jainism
- Deity: Aranath, Mallinath and Munisuvratnath
- Festivals: Mahavir Jayanti, Das Lakshana
- Governing body: Karkala Jain Math

Location
- Location: Karkala, Udupi, Karnataka
- Interactive map of Chaturmukha Basadi, Karkala
- Coordinates: 13.2°N 74.983°E

Architecture
- Creator: Immadi Bhairarasa Vodeya
- Established: 1432 A.D.
- Temple: 1

Chaturmukha Basadi is a symmetrical Jain temple situated in Karkala, Karnataka, India. It is one of the most famous monuments in Karkala.

== History ==
The Chaturmukha Basadi was by Immadi Bhairarasa Vodeya in 1586. The history of the temple is recorded in a long inscription of Bhairava II dated 1586 CE. According to the inscription, Bhairava II constructed the temple on Chikkabetta hill at Pandyanagari in the vicinity of the Gommateshwara statue. The record names the temple Tribhuvanatilaka-Jina-Chaityalaya and describes it as sarvatobhadra and chaturmukha, referring to its symmetrical four-faced plan.

Bhairava II belonged to the ruling family of Kalasa-Karkala. Krishna Sastri's analysis of the inscription and related records identifies him as a direct descendant of the Kalasa chiefs, whose political centre had shifted towards Karkala by the 16th century. The temple was established within an already important Jain sacred landscape. The nearby colossal image of Bahubali had been installed by Vira Pandya in 1432 CE.

== About temple ==
It has four symmetrical faces and is thus called chaturmukha (four-faces) basadi. The temple enshrines idols of Aranatha, Mallinatha and Munisuvrata. This basadi, carved granite rocks, is known as Tribhuvana Tilaka Jina Chaityalaya or Ratnatraya dhama from inscriptions.

The inscription records the installation of Jina images within the temple and describes the arrangements made for their regular worship. It faces the famous Karkala Bahubali statue, installed in 1432 by Veera Pandya. The two monuments stand on opposing rocky elevations within the historic Jain landscape of Karkala. The Chaturmukha Basadi was constructed on Chikkabetta, while the inscription specifically locates it in the presence of the Gommateshwara image.

It faces the famous Karkala Bahubali statue installed in the year 1432 by Veera Pandya of the Santara dynasty on February 13, 1432, on the instructions of the Bhattaraka of Karkala, Lalitakeerti.

== Architecture ==
Chaturmukha Basadi is constructed principally of granite and takes the form of a symmetrical four-sided temple. Each of its four sides is provided with an entrance, accounting for its name. The structure consists of a square hall with pillared porticoes and entrances on all four sides. The roof is flat and formed from massive granite slabs. The architectural conception of the monument is explicitly reflected in its inscriptional description as sarvatobhadra, a term associated with a structure accessible or auspicious from all sides, and chaturmukha, referring to its four symmetrical faces.

The temple contains life-size standing images of Aranatha, Mallinatha and Munisuvrata, together with representations of other Tirthankaras.

== Inscription ==
A major inscription of Bhairava II survives inside the temple. It is engraved on a 4 feet 4 inches (1.32 m) by 3 feet 2 inches (0.97 m) black granite slab and positioned beside the western entrance to the sanctum. The upper part of the slab contains sculptural decoration. At the centre is a seated Jina beneath a triple umbrella and within a mandapa, flanked by lampstands. Representations of the sun and crescent moon also appear on the slab, together with a cow suckling its calf.

The inscription, dated 1586 CE, records the construction of the Tribhuvanatilaka-Jina-Chaityalaya by Bhairava II. The inscription documents foundation of the temple along with extensive arrangements for its maintenance and worship. It also records grants of villages, agricultural revenues and provisions for offerings, ritual bathing of the images, lamps, incense and annual ceremonies.

The village of Telara, identified with modern Tellar approximately 3 miles (4.8 km) northeast of Karkala, was granted to the Chaturmukha Basadi. The nearby villages of Ranjala and Nalluru also contributed revenue to the establishment. The detailed allocations recorded in the inscription include provisions for three daily acts of worship, rice offerings, ritual bathing of the images, Siddhachakra worship, fruit, sandalwood, incense, oil and annual ceremonies.

== Patronage ==
The inscription provides detailed evidence for the economic organisation of the temple. Bhairava II endowed the establishment with land and revenues intended to support its continuing ritual activities rather than merely financing its initial construction. The grants demonstrate the relationship between the Jain establishment and the Kalasa-Karkala ruling family during the late 16th century. The inscription also records the personnel responsible for worship at the different entrances of the four-faced temple.

== Conservation ==
The Chaturmukha Basadi is maintained as a protected monument by the Archaeological Survey of India. Conservation work undertaken by the ASI in 2006–07 included removal of deteriorated concrete from the roof and the laying of a fresh lime-concrete weatherproof course to prevent water leakage. The entrance mandapa, which had become sunken and displaced, was dismantled and reconstructed after strengthening its plinth. Cracked beams and roof slabs were repaired using non-corrosive stainless-steel dowels and reset in their original positions.

== Gallery ==
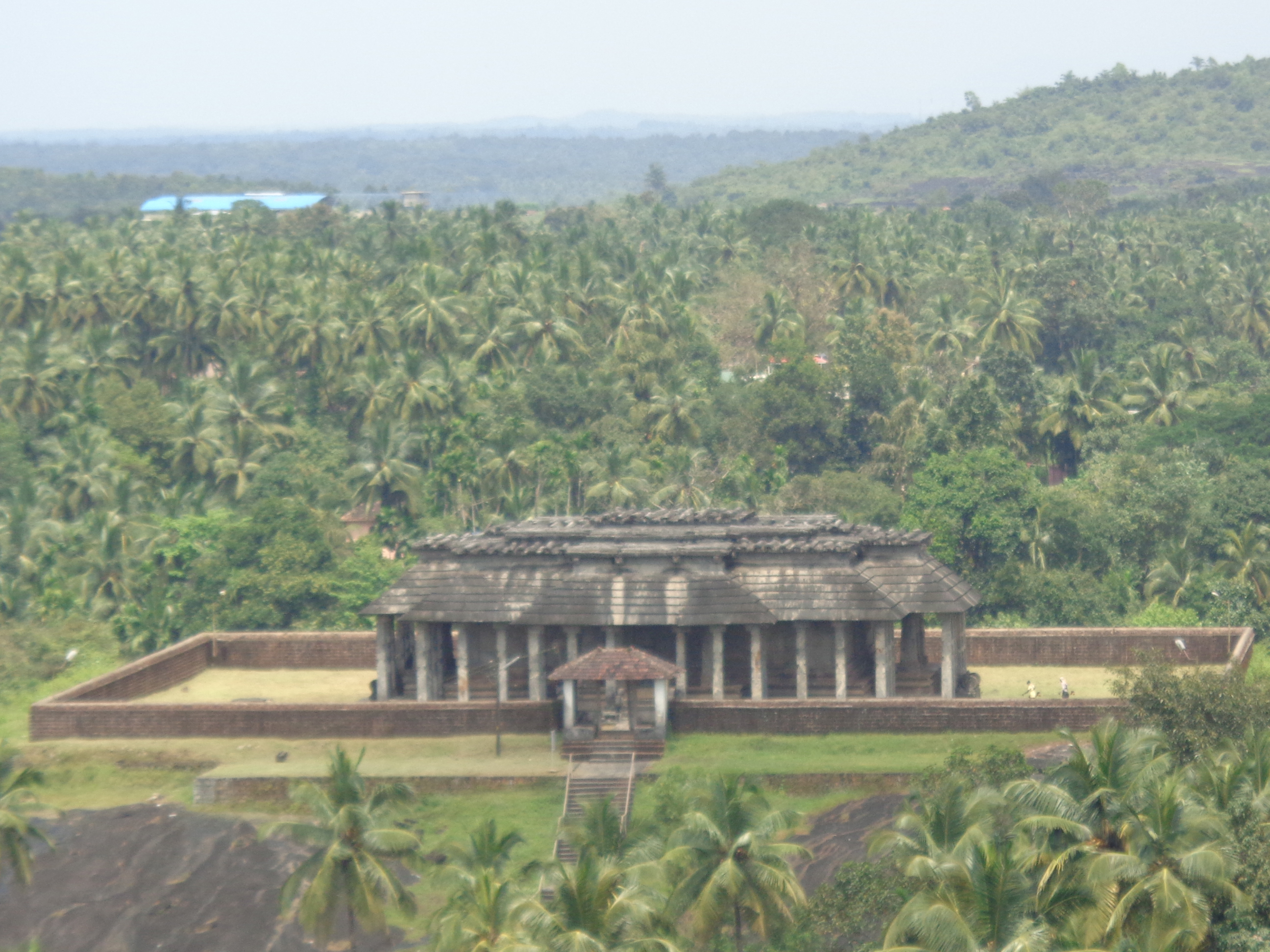
Chaturmukha Basadi (view from the Gommateshwara statue of Karkala)

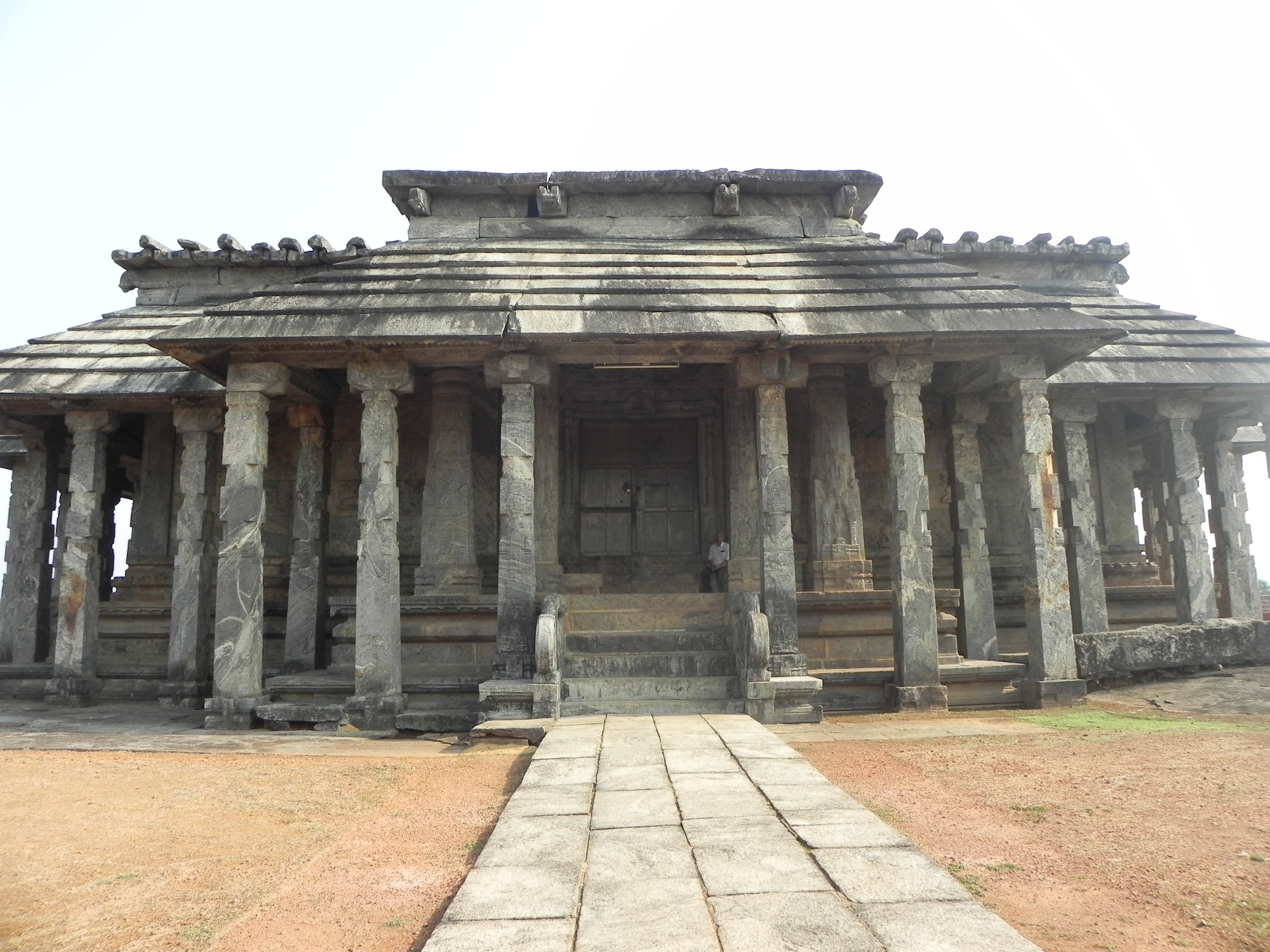
Chaturmukha Basadi

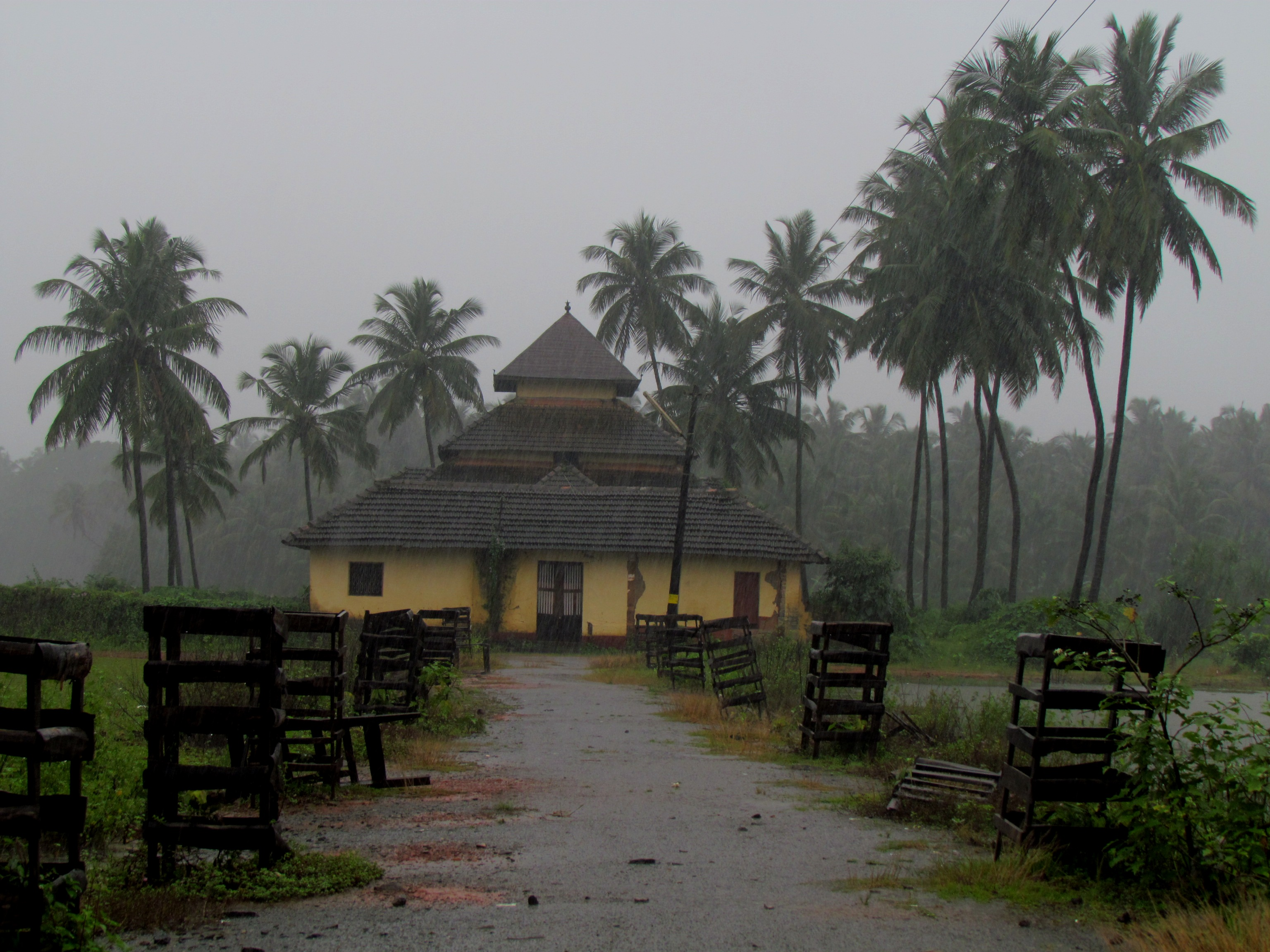
Kere Basadi

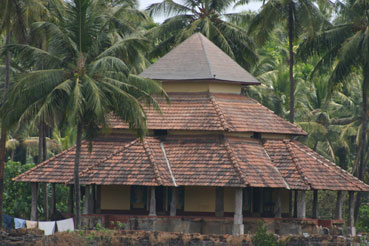
Padmavati Basadi, Varanga Jain temple

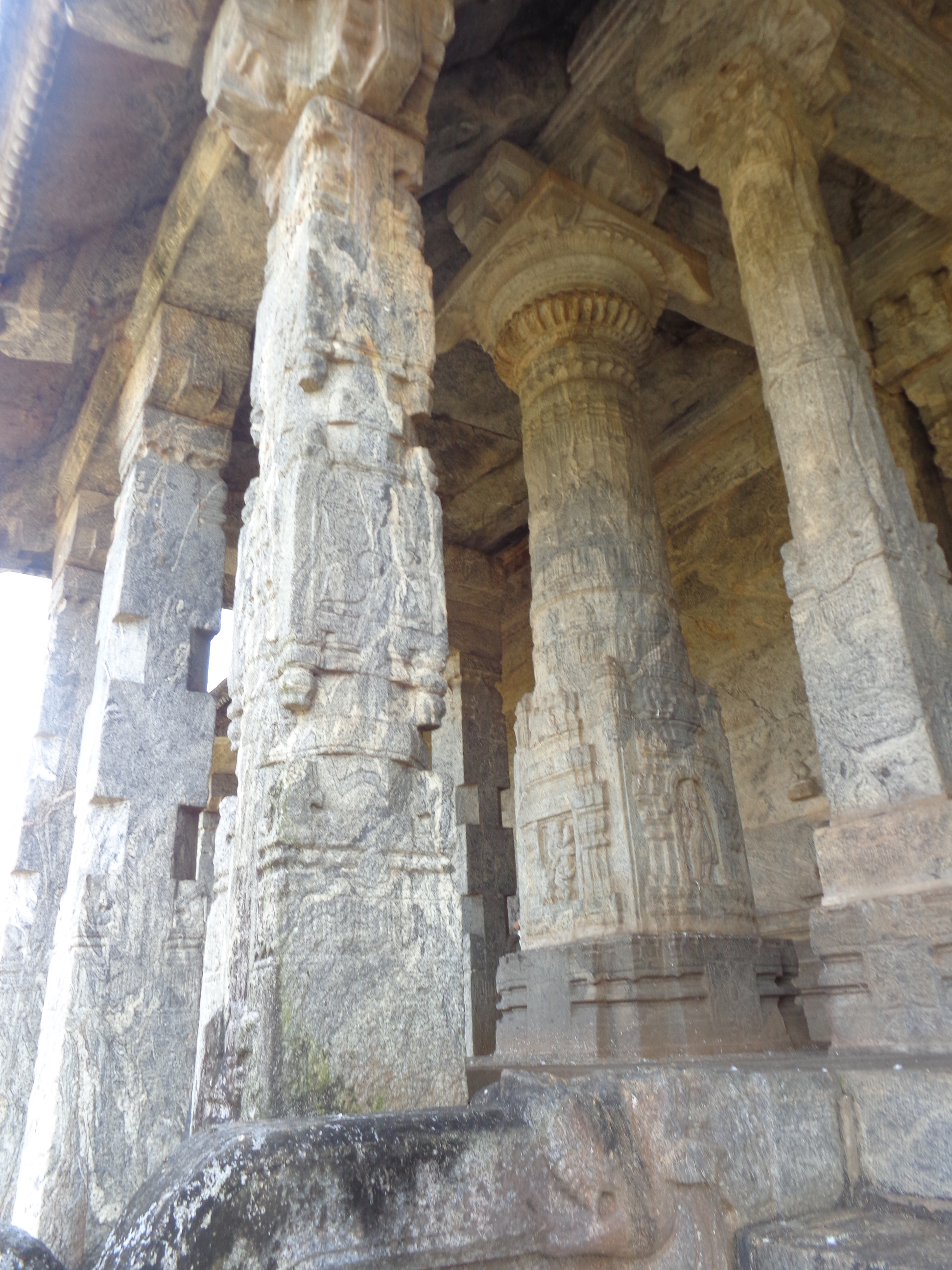
Pillar at Chaturmukha Basadi

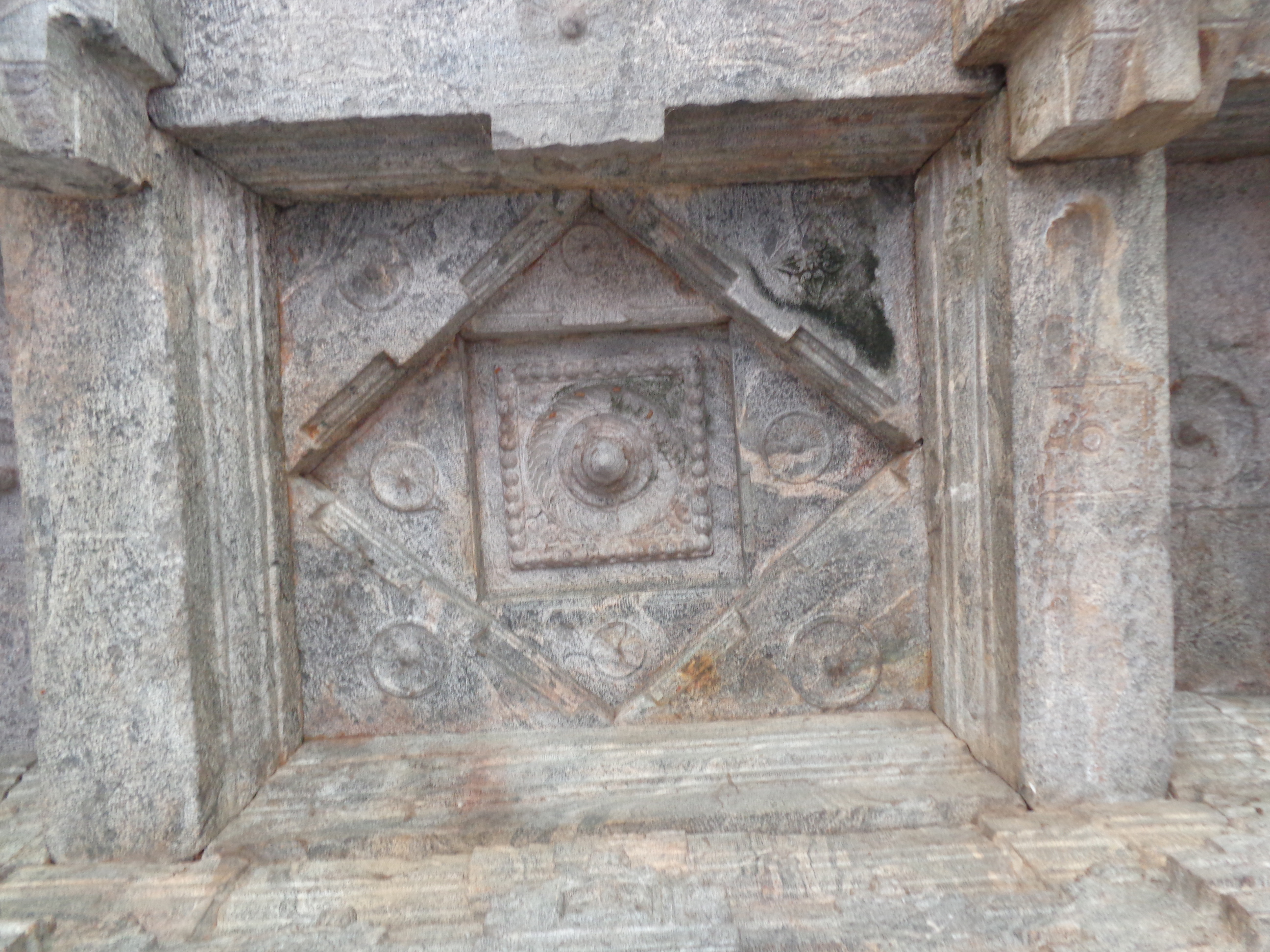
Roof at Chaturmukha Basadi

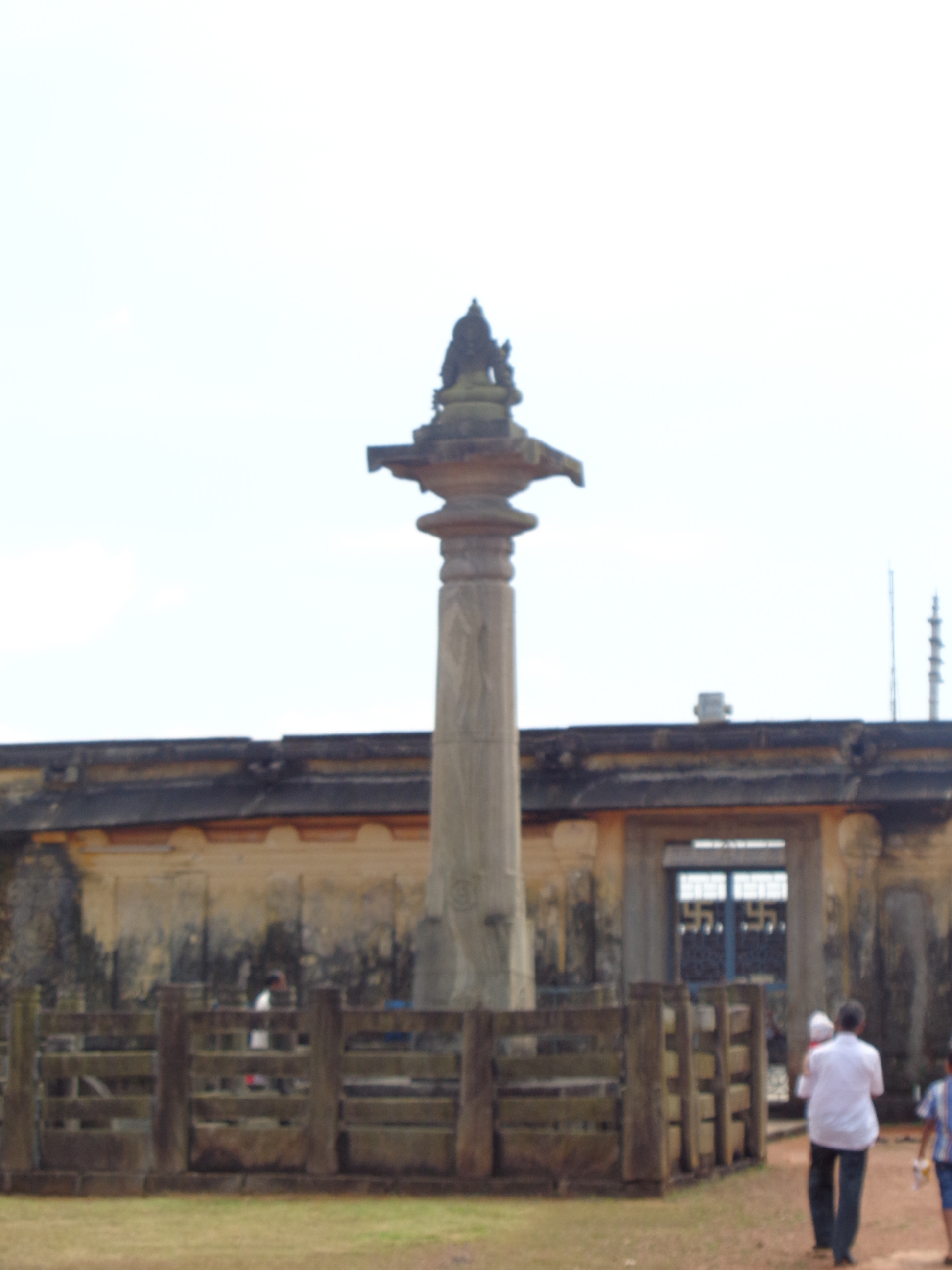
pillar at Gommateshwara statue

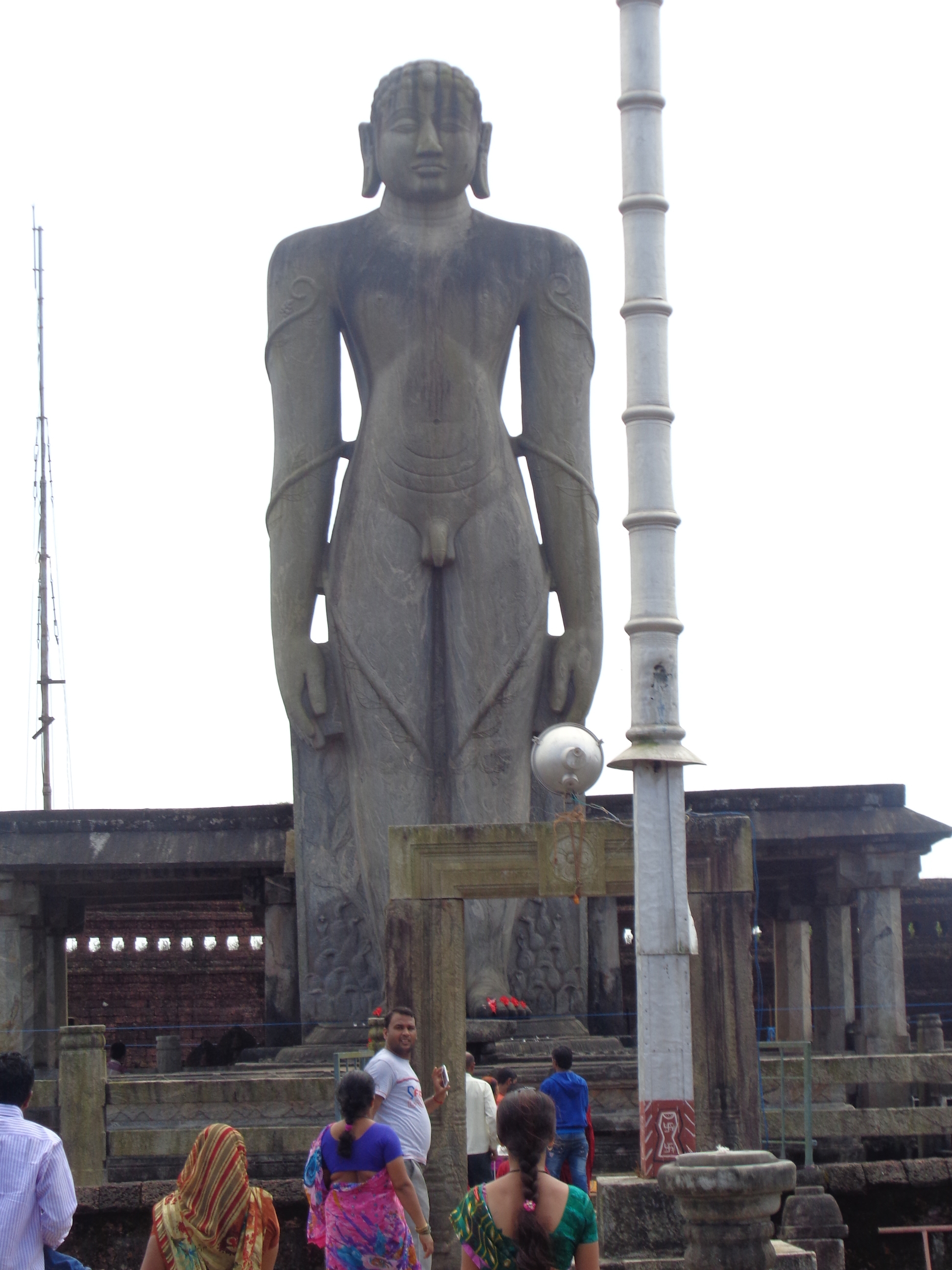
Gommateshwara Bahubali statue

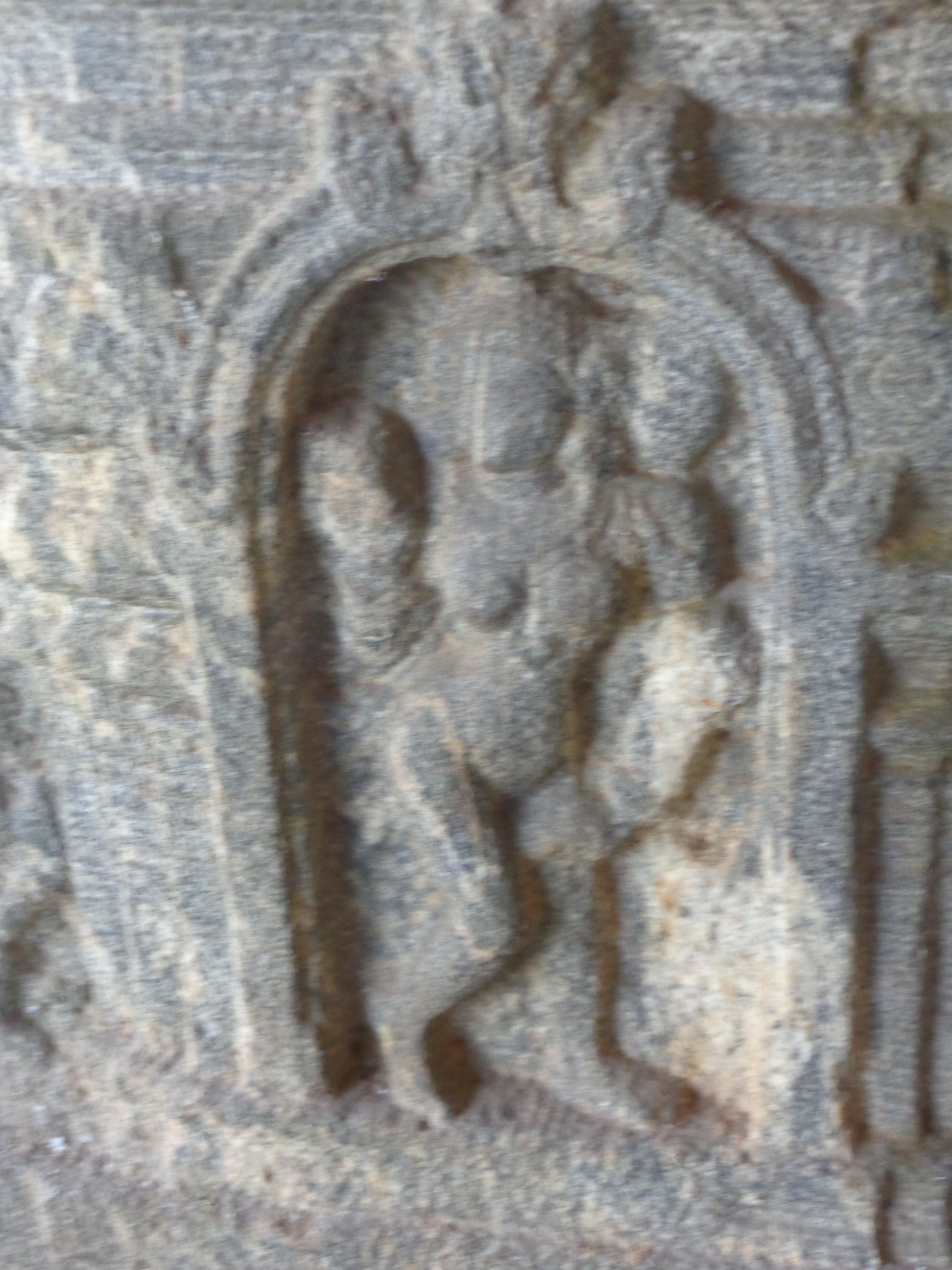
the shilpa at chaturmukha basati

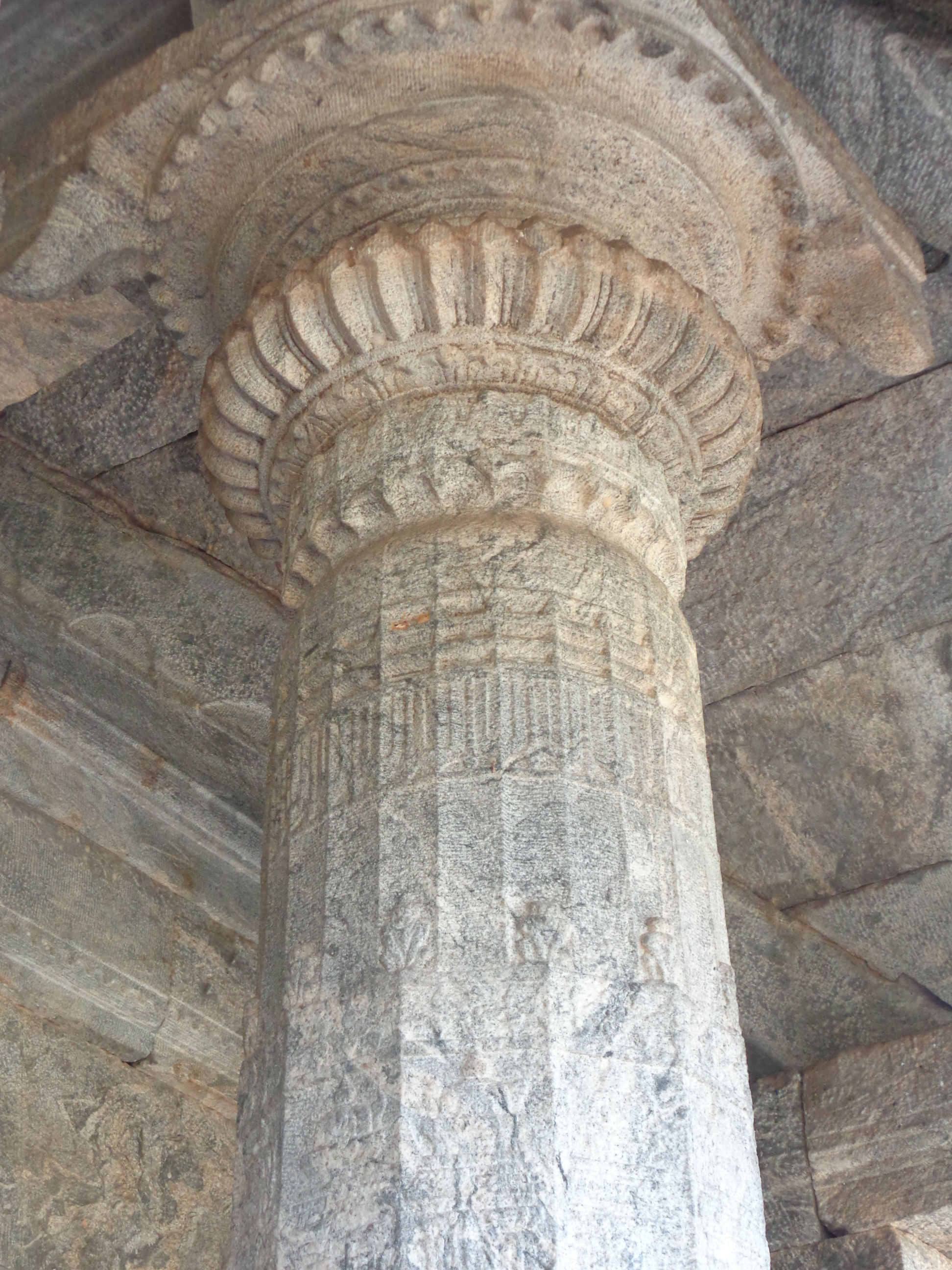
a pillar at chaturmukha basati

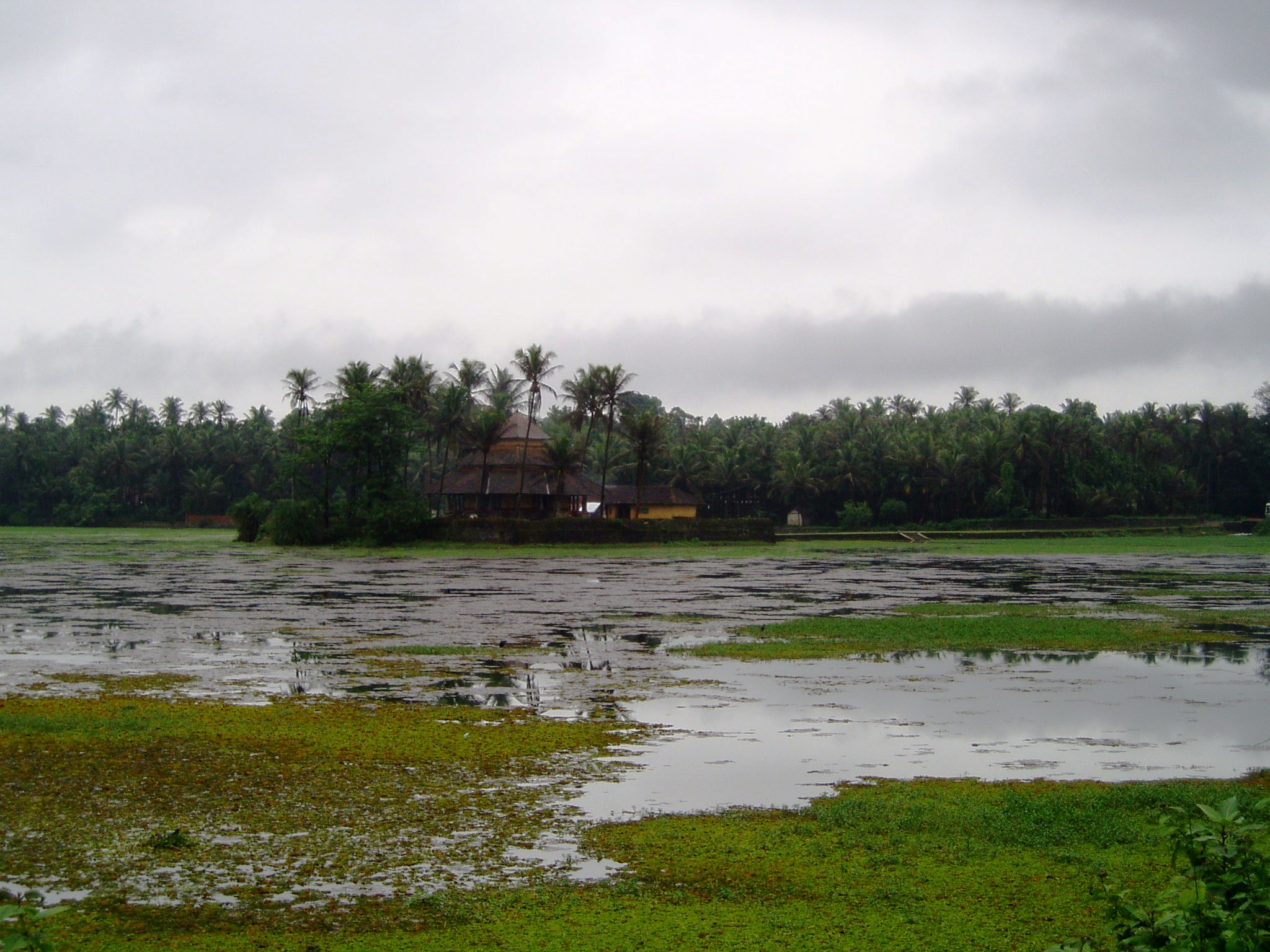
Varanga Jain temple at the center of pond in Karkala

== See also ==
- Kere Basadi
- Saavira Kambada Basadi
- Gommateshwara statue
