= Anekere =

Village in Karnataka, India with ancient Hoysala temple

- village
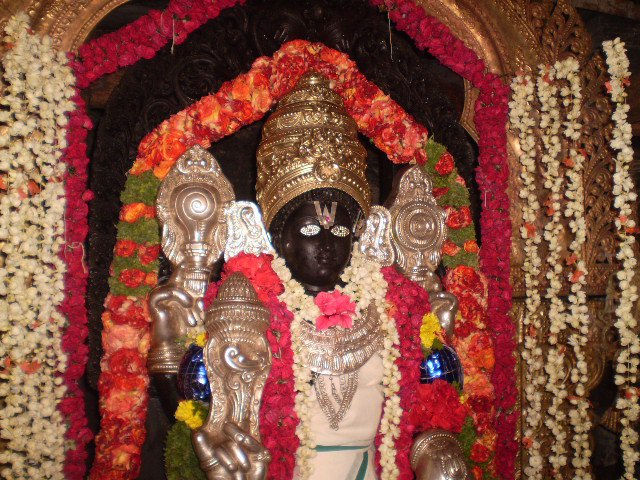
- The Lord Chennakeshava present in the Village

- Location in Karnataka, India Anekere (India)
- Coordinates: 12°54′40.89″N 76°20′33.86″E
- Country: India
- State: Karnataka
- District: Hassan
- Talukas: Channarayapatna

Government
  - Body: Village Panchayat

Languages
  - Official: Kannada
- Time zone: UTC+5:30 (IST)
- Postal code: 573116
- Telephone code: 08176
- Vehicle registration: KA-13
- Nearest city: Hassan, India
- Lok Sabha constituency: Shravanabelagola
- Vidhan Sabha constituency: Shravanabelagola
- Civic agency: Village Panchayat

Anekere is a village in the southern state of Karnataka, India. It is located in the Channarayapatna taluk of Hassan district. The village has a Chennakeshava temple built during the Hoysala Empire.

== Gallery ==
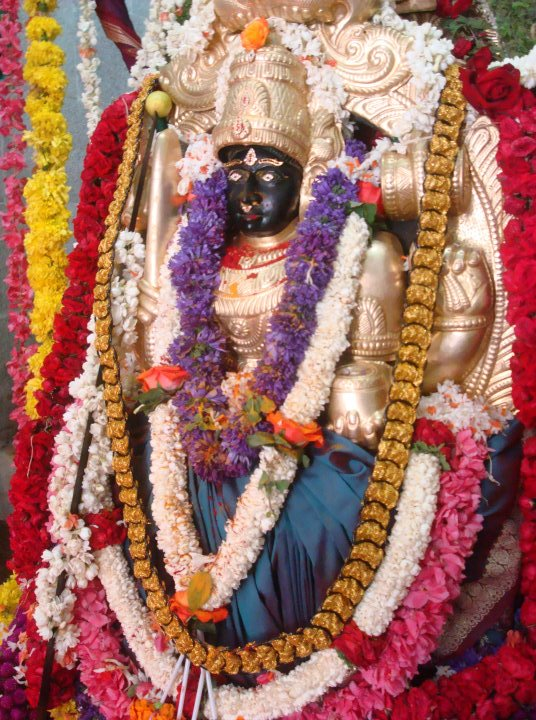
The village deity aanekere maarummu (ಆನೆಕೆರೆ ಮಾರಮ್ಮ)

The car festival (ruthOtsuvu) of aanekere maarummu is celebrated on the second Tuesday after the ugaadi festival. It is a big fair with 3 (three) ruthus (cars), one from anekere and the other two from neighboring smaller villages.

== See also ==
- Hassan District
- Districts of Karnataka
