= Shantinatha Basadi, Jinanathapura =

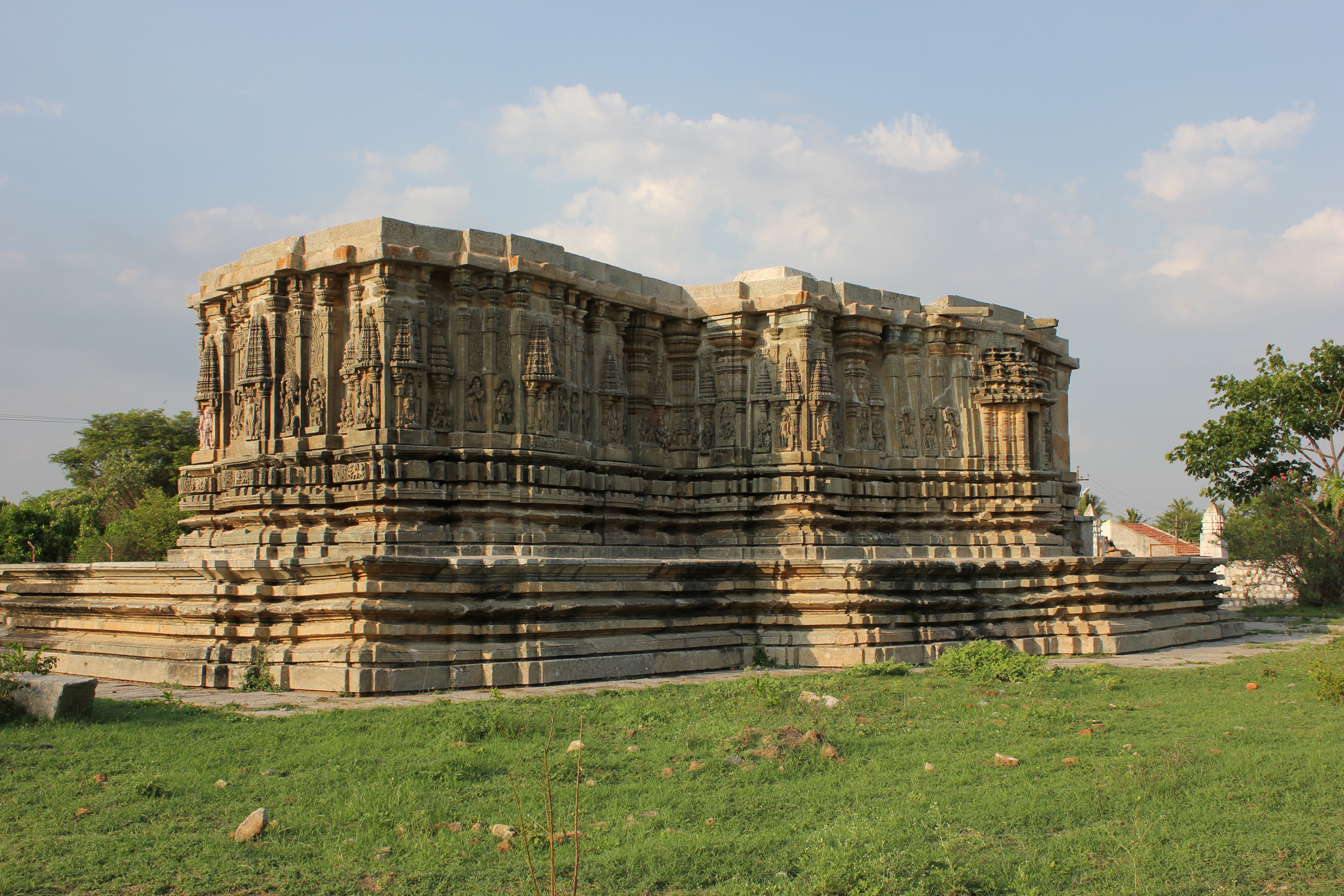
- Shantinatha Basadi in Jinanaathapura

- Location in Karnataka, India Shantinatha Basadi, Jinanathapura (India)

Religion
- Affiliation: Jainism
- Deity: Shantinatha
- Festival: Mahavir Jayanti

Location
- Location: Hassan district, Karnataka
- Coordinates: 12°51′40.9″N 76°29′11.6″E

Architecture
- Style: Hoysala architecture
- Creator: Vishnuvardhana
- Established: 1117 A.D.

Shantinatha Basadi (or Shanteshvara basadi), a Jain temple dedicated to the sixteenth Tirthankar Shantinatha is located in the historically important temple town of Jinanathapura near Shravanabelagola (also spelt "Jainanathapura"). It is a village in Channarayapatna taluk in the Hassan district of Karnataka state, India.

== History ==
Jinanathapura was founded by Ganga Raja, a commander and an influential Jain patron in the early 12th century during the rule of the noted Hoysala King Vishnuvardhana. The Shantinatha Basadi (also spelt "basti") is a fine specimen of the Hoysala style of architecture and was built in c. 1117 A.D. during the rule of King Veera Ballala II. According to the art historian Adam Hardy, the Basadi is a single shrine (vimana) construction with a closed mantapa and the building material used is Soap stone. The monument is protected by the Karnataka state division of the Archaeological Survey of India.

== Temple plan ==
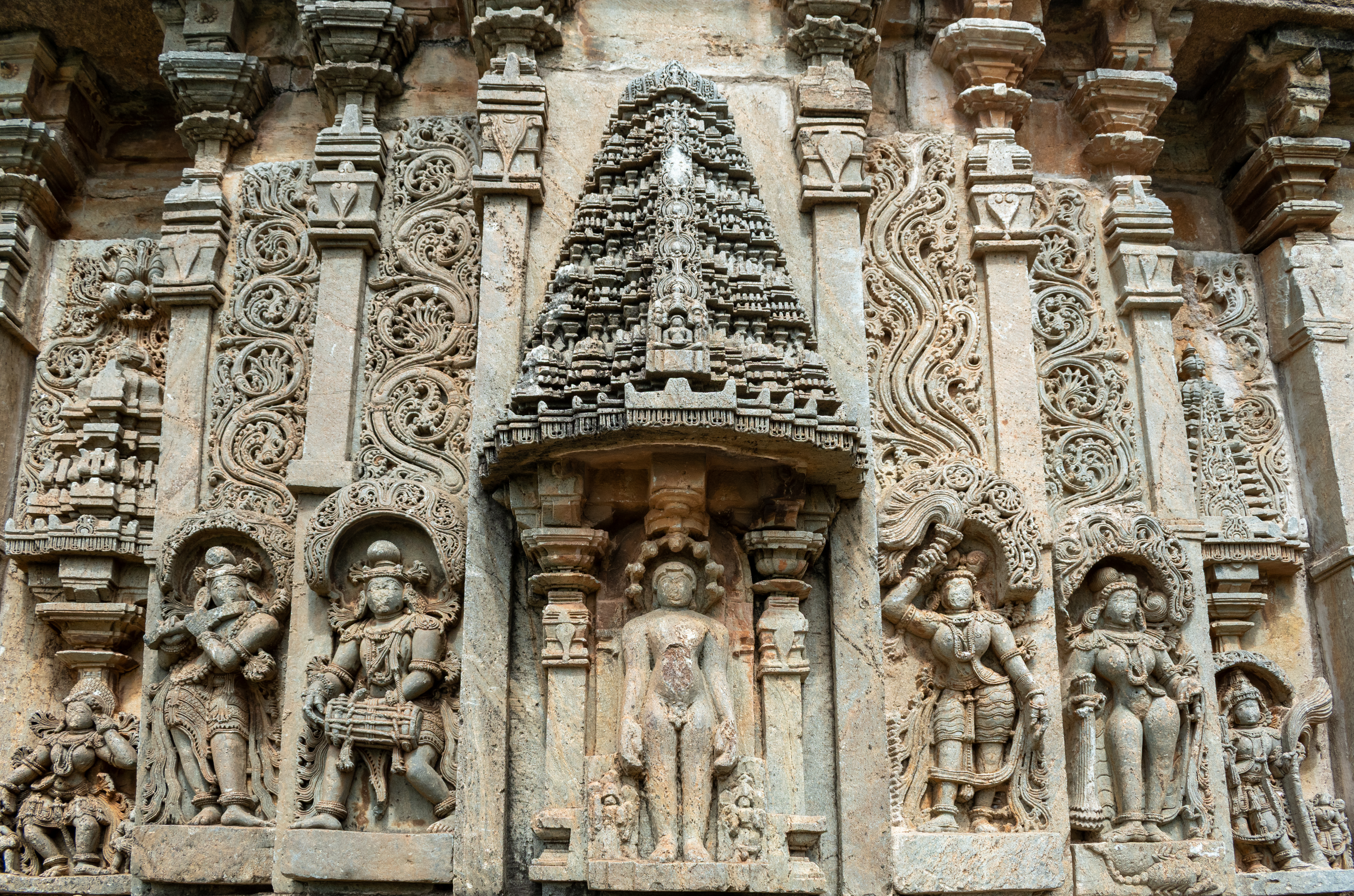
The temple's exterior is decorated with intricate carving

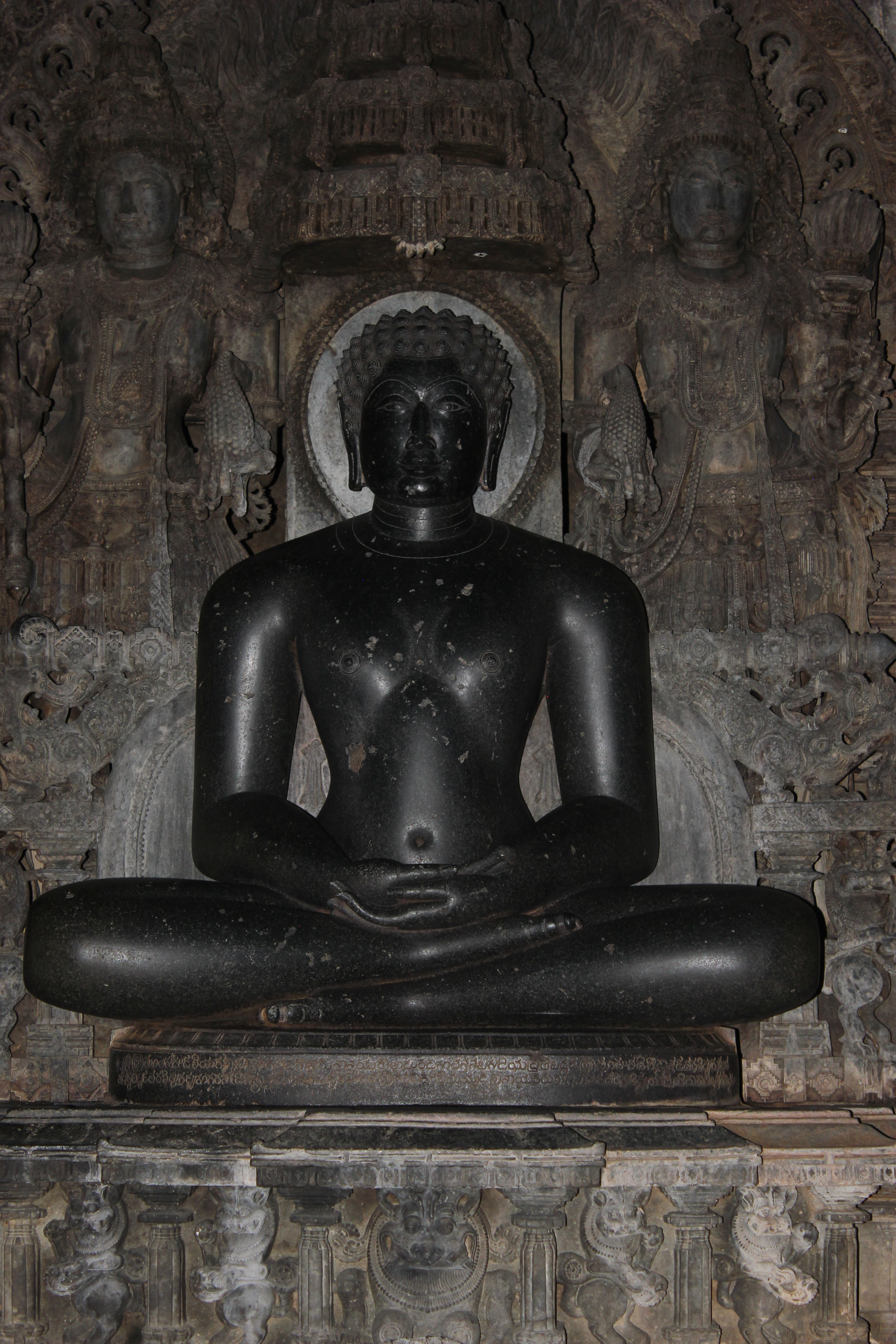
Seated image of Shantinatha with old Kannada inscription (1200 A.D.) engraved on the pedestal

The Shantinatha Basadi exhibits interesting departure from contemporary austere Jain temples (such as the Akkana Basadi) because of its rich and bold exterior panel relief, an idiom that was more common with the contemporary Hindu temples built by the Hoysala kings or by influential persons associated with the empire. A Kannada language inscription on the pedestal of the seated image of the Shantinatha reveals the Basadi was built by Recana (also called Recimayya, Recarasa and Recaprabhu), a general and minister of the king Ballala II. It also gives some information about his Jain preceptors. Recana, who was earlier in the service of the Kalyani Chalukyas and later the Southern Kalachuris appears to have transferred his loyalty to the Hoysala king. Inscriptions reveal that he built Jain temples at Lakkundi and Arasikere as well.

The temple stands on a jagati (platform) which is about a meter in height. According to art historian Gerard Foekema, being a single vimana (shrine) construction it qualifies as a ekakuta plan (a tower called shikhara over one shrine). The ceiling of the closed mantapa is supported by four lathe turned pillars. These are, according to art historian Percy Brown are key note Hoysala features. Despite the rich exterior decoration, the temple lacks the decorative bands of molding frieze that encircle the temple on the base of the outer walls, a feature that is characteristic of Hoysala temples of the 12th and 13th centuries. The interior walls of the Basadi is plain but the lintel decoration over the entrance to the sanctum is elaborate and consists of five Jainas (Jain monks), the central of which is a replica of the image of Shantinatha which sits on a seven sectioned throne inside the sanctum.

== Gallery ==
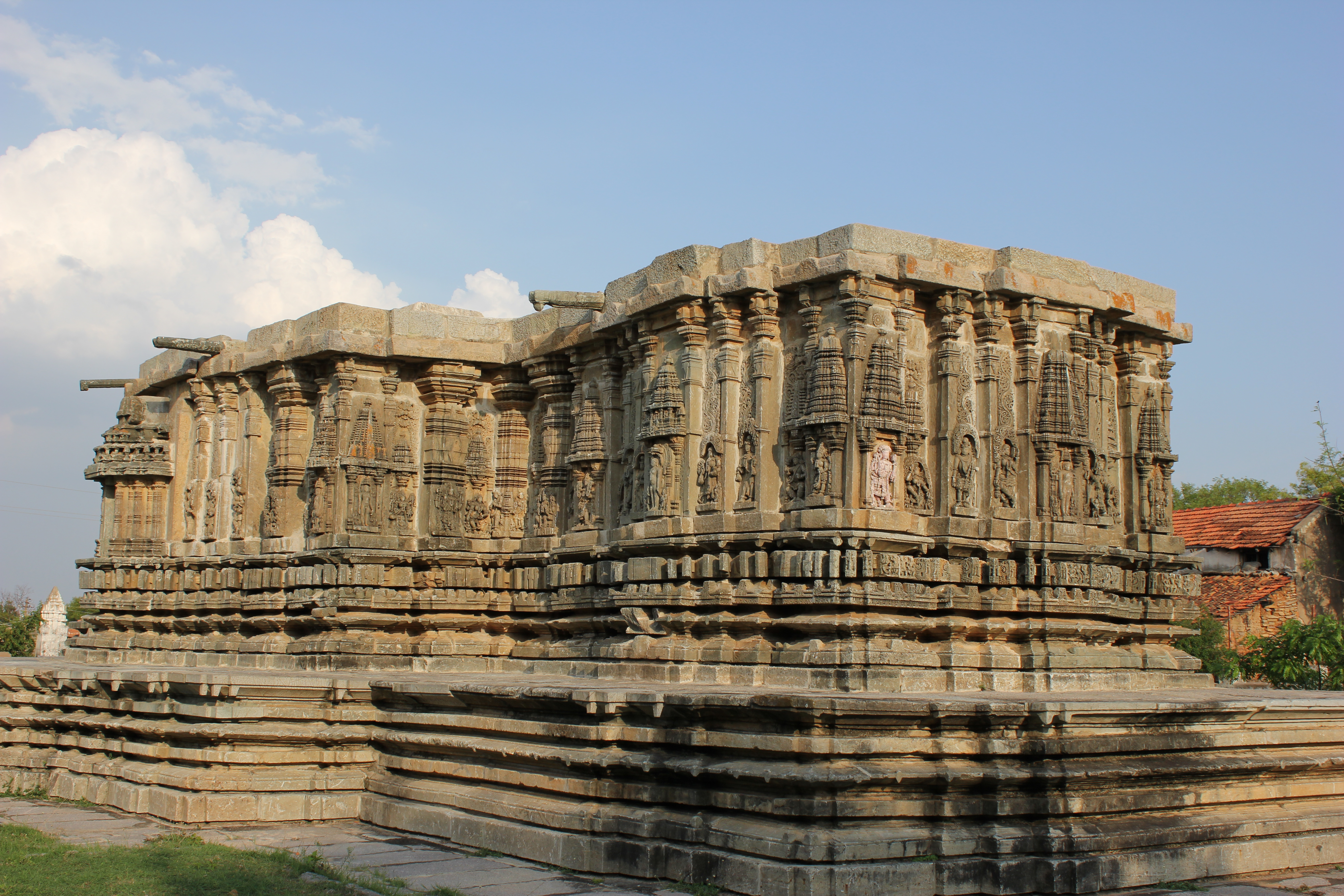
Rear view of Shantinatha basadi at Jinanathapura

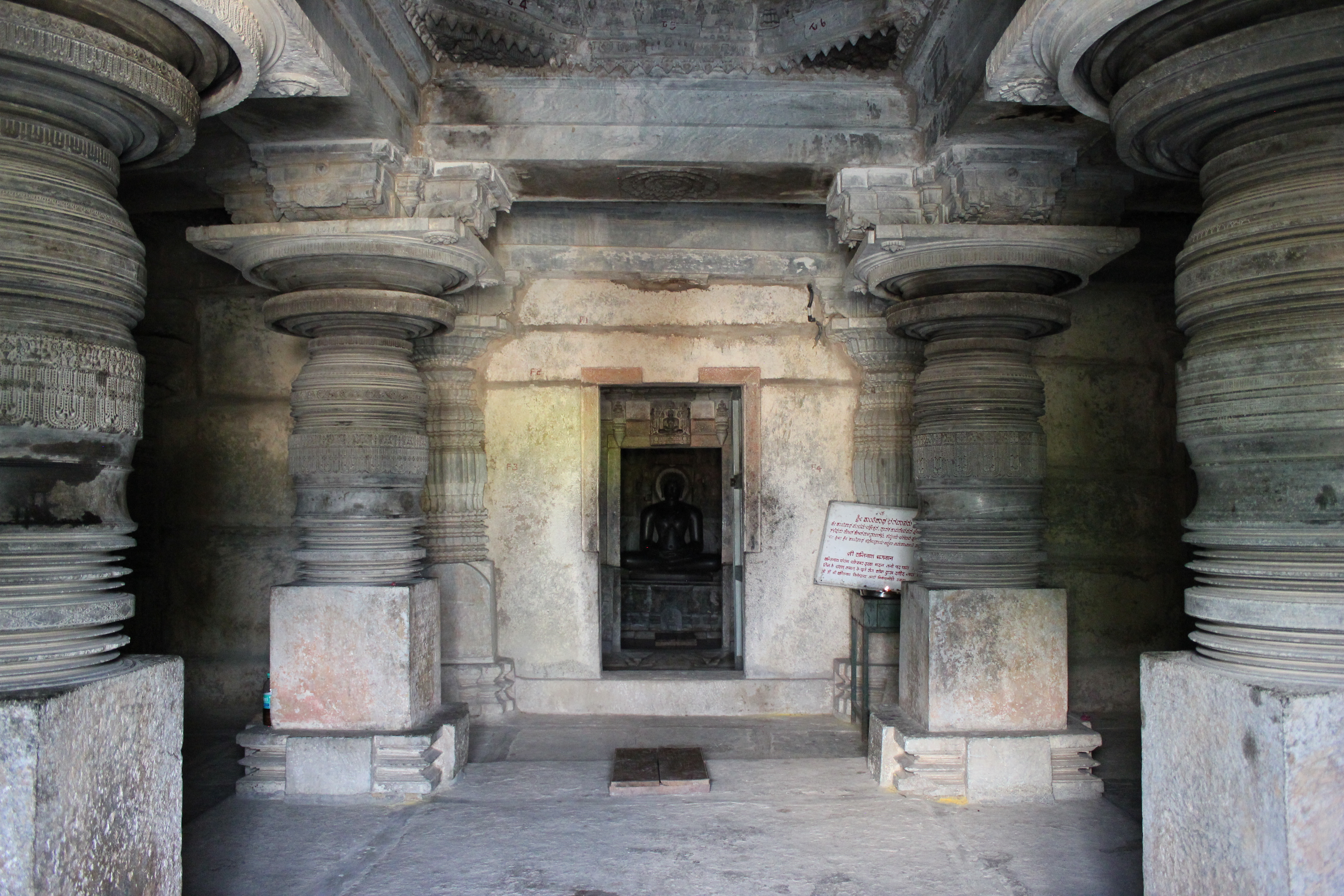
Closed mantapa with lathe turned pillars in Shantinatha Basadi in Jinanathapura

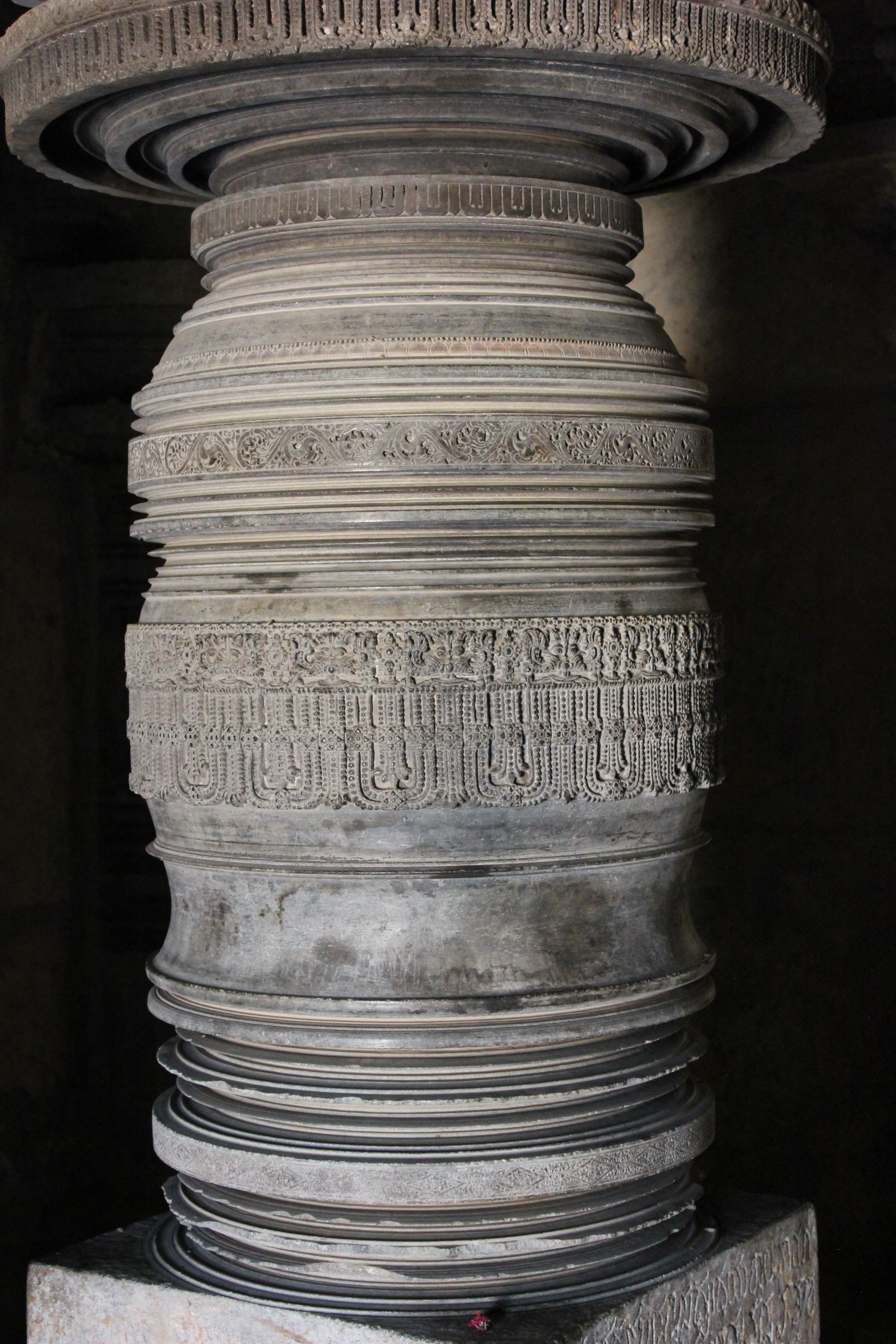
Decorative Pillar art in mantapa of Shantinatha Basadi in Jinanathapura

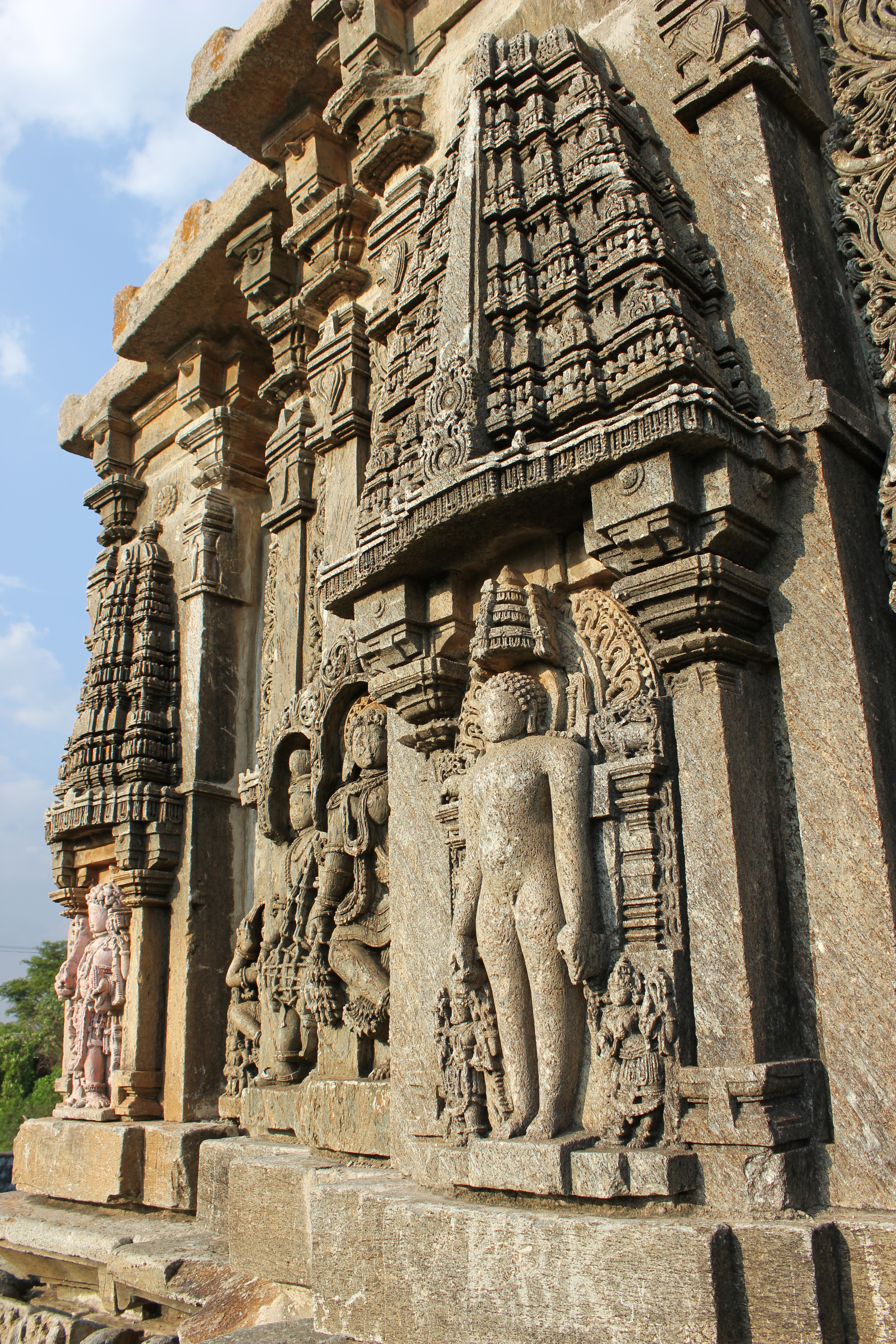
Shrine wall relief sculpture in Shantinatha Basadi in Jinanathapura

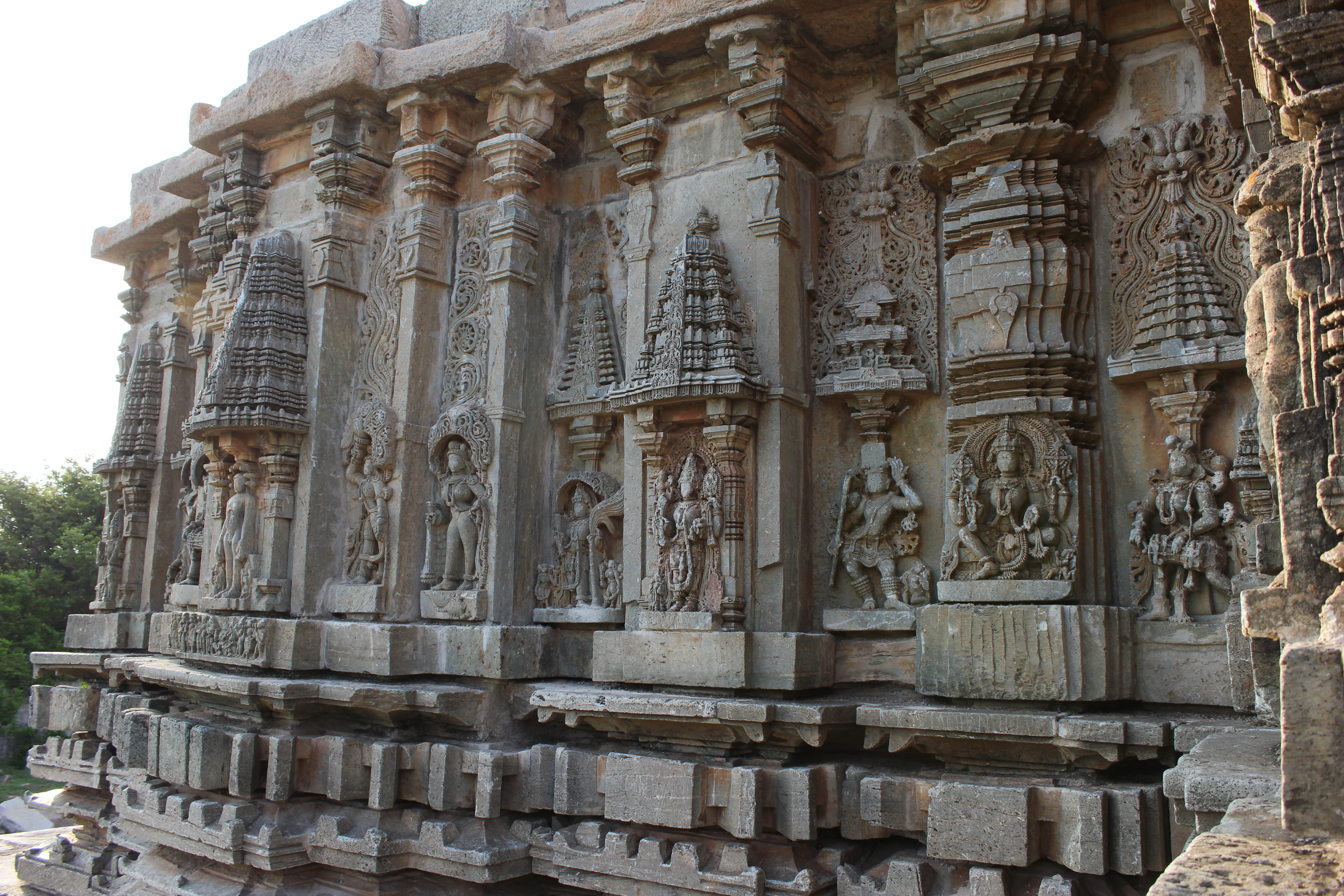
Shrine wall relief sculpture in Shantinatha Basadi in Jinanathapura

== See also ==
- Akkana Basadi
- Bhandara Basadi
- Shantinatha Basadi, Halebidu
