= Key Kawamura =

Spanish-Japanese architect and designer

Key Portilla Kawamura (born 1979, Oviedo, Spain) is a Spanish-Japanese architect, designer, creative entrepreneur and an international speaker specialised in workplace design and the future of work. He is the co-founder of the design studios Kawamura-Ganjavian and Studio Banana and the startups OstrichPillow and Moggie.

== Early life and education ==
Kawamura studied architecture at the University of East London under the guidance of Peter Salter, where he met Ali Ganjavian, with whom he would later co-found several initiatives. He later pursued postgraduate studies at the Architectural Association.

After completing his studies, Kawamura gained experience working in Tokyo with Kazuyo Sejima and in Basel with Herzog & de Meuron.

== Career ==
In 2000, Kawamura and Ganjavian co-founded the architecture and design studio Kawamura-Ganjavian (Studio KG) in London. The practice moved to Madrid in 2006, where they founded Studio Banana, the first co-working space in Spain and a multidisciplinary creative platform combining architecture, design, media, and strategy.

Kawamura gained international recognition in 2011 when the Ostrich Pillow—a product he co-designed—was featured in the Museum of Modern Art (MoMA) exhibition “Talk to Me.” In 2012, Ostrich Pillow was formalized as a startup focused on rest and wellbeing. In 2015, he co-founded Moggie, a wearable pet-tech company developed in collaboration with the Royal College of Art and MIT, offering AI-powered insights into feline behavior.

In the same period, Kawamura led the expansion of Studio Banana in Switzerland, opening offices in Lausanne and Basel, where it continued to develop a portfolio of public, cultural, and corporate projects.

Kawamura has been particularly active in the design of workplace and learning environments and the dissemination of his understanding of the evolution of workplace design and work dynamics while working for clients such as EY, Nestlé, the United Nations, and the International Olympic Committee.

== Selected Projects ==
As strategic lead for Work & Learning Environments at Studio Banana, Kawamura has overseen multiple projects, including:

- La Fontaine at Rolex Learning Center, EPFL (2011)
- McCann WorldGroup Headquarters, Madrid (2016)
- Emirates Room (Room XVII), United Nations Office at Geneva (2016)
- FTI Headquarters, Geneva (2016)
- Ernst & Young Weavespace, London (2017)
- International Olympic Committee Welcome Experience, Lausanne (2019)
- Losinger Marazzi HQ, Lausanne (2019)
- NTT Headquarters, Lausanne (2021)
- Nestlé R+D Accelerator, Lausanne (2022)
- IDEHAP Learning Lab, University of Lausanne (2023)
- Johnson & Johnson Workplace, Zug (2022)
- Audemars Piguet Manufacture, Le Locle (2023)
- QoQa Headquarters, Lausanne (2023)
- “Loops” meditative installation, Inselspital Bern (2024)
- Espacio Movistar, Telefónica Headquarters, Madrid (2024)

== Product Design ==
Key products developed under Kawamura’s creative direction include:

- kangaroo light: a portable, built in battery powered soft luminaire
- BINPAN: a hybrid dustbin/dustpan
- Cajonlight: a minimal, multi-position lamp
- Deskshell: a portable, sound-absorbing desk divider
- Ductpan: a dustpan with a funnel-shaped handle
- Giraffe: a cork space divider with integrated power hub

== Exhibitions ==
Kawamura’s work has been exhibited at prestigious venues including:

- Museum of Modern Art (MoMA), New York; "Talk to Me: Design and the communication between People and Objects". MoMA. MoMA.
- Triennale di Milano
- Transmediale, Berlin
- Fondazione Pistoletto, Biella
- Singapore Design Museum
- Milan Design Week "Kawamura-Ganjavian". Madrid Abierto. Madrid Abierto.

== Awards ==
- 2002 Special Mention, Minimum Prize, Fondazione Pistoletto.
- 2010 Espacio Iniciarte, Finalist, Saloni Awards, for the *Iniciarte cultural space at ARCO "Finalist X Saloni Awards". OHLAB. OHLAB.
- 2013 Credit Suisse Best Teaching Award for innovative design education.
- 2016 Best Pet Device, CES, for Moggie.
- 2020 Digital Signage Awards, Corporate & Workplace Category, for IOC project "IOC Agora: Project Documentation and Award". iArt. iArt.
- 2020 FINSA Award for User and Multimedia Experience (IOC)
- 2020 Best Interior Design Project Award at Advanced *Architecture Awards for IOC "Studio Interiors Summit". Rebuild. Rebuild.

== Teaching and Public Engagement ==
Kawamura has taught and lectured at institutions including:

- IED Instituto Europeo di Design, Director of transdisciplinary design Master Program, 2009-2010, Madrid, Spain
- Accademia di Architettura di Mendrisio, Italy
- ETH Zürich, Switzerland
- EPFL Lausanne, Facilitation of pedagogic workshops and director or architectural design studio at the ALICE laboratory, 2011-2014, Lausanne, Switzerland
- The Bartlett, University College London (UCL), United Kingdom
- University of East London, United Kingdom
- Undergraduate design studio director, 2010-2012, IE University, Madrid, Spain
- TEDx Basel, 2023, Basel, Switzerland
- Stanford University, United States
- Harvard University, 2015, Cambridge, United States
- Creative Mornings Sanctuary, 2023, Zürich, Switzerland
- Skolkovo School of Management Moscow, Russia
- Tokyo Designers Week, Japan
- Guggenheim Bilbao, Spain

== Publications ==
In 2019, Studio Banana published Think / Work Out of the Box, a book capturing its approach to workplace innovation and design thinking.
