= Simon Unwin =

British architect and writer (born 1952)

- Born: 1952 (age 73–74); Yorkshire, England
- Education: Chelsea School of Art; Welsh School of Architecture (PhD)
- Occupations: Architect and writer
- Organizations: Welsh School of Architecture (Senior Lecturer); University of Dundee (Professor of Architecture, 2004–09)
- Website: simonunwin.com

Simon Unwin (born 1952) is a British architect and writer.

== Life ==
He was born in 1952 in Yorkshire, but grew up in Wales.

He studied at the Chelsea School of Art in London and the Welsh School of Architecture in Cardiff. From the Welsh School of Architecture, he obtained a PhD, and he went on to become a senior lecturer there.

His book, Analysing Architecture, was first published in 1997 and is described as having a "reputation internationally as one of the best introductions to architecture". His first three books, including An Architectural Notebook: Wall (2000) and Doorway (2007), have been described as forming a trilogy.

From 2004 to 2009, he was Professor of Architecture at the University of Dundee, where he is now an emeritus professor.

He currently resides in Cardiff.

== Work ==
Unwin has written several books about architecture:

- An Architecture Notebook: Wall (2000) ISBN 0415228735
- Doorway (2007) ISBN 9780415458818
- Exercises in Architecture: Learning to Think as an Architect (2012) ISBN 9781136486623
- Analysing Architecture (fourth edition 2014) ISBN 9781317810940
- Twenty-Five Buildings Every Architect Should Understand (2015; first published in 2010 as Twenty Buildings Every Architect Should Understand) ISBN 9781317555025
- The Ten Most Influential Buildings in History: Architecture's Archetypes (2016) ISBN 9781317483243
- Children as Place-makers: The Innate Architect in All of Us (2019) ISBN 9781138046009
- Curve: Possibilities and Problems with Deviating from the Straight in Architecture (2019) ISBN 9781138045941
- Metaphor: An Exploration of the Metaphorical Dimensions and Potential of Architecture (2019) ISBN 9781138045439
