= Flora Samuel =

British architect, author and academic

Flora Samuel is a British architect, author and academic, former head of the schools of architecture at Sheffield University and the University of Cambridge.

She was educated at the University of Cambridge.

She worked for ten years at the Welsh School of Architecture, Cardiff. She was head of the MArch course at the University of Bath before, in 2009, becoming the Head of the School of Architecture at Sheffield University, the first woman to hold the post.

Samuel previously held the post of Professor of Architecture in the Built Environment at the University of Reading, where she helped set up a new industry-led architecture school in close collaboration with construction. She was appointed as the first RIBA Vice President for Research in 2018.

She became head of the School of Architecture at Cambridge University in 2023 and continues as Professor of Architecture (1970) and director of the Cambridge Urban Room.

== Publications ==
- "Le Corbusier: Architect and Feminist", Wiley-Academy, 2004, ISBN 0470-847-476
- "Le Corbusier in Detail", Architectural Press, 2007, ISBN 978-0-7506-6354-0
- "Le Corbusier and the Architectural Promenade", Birkhauser, 2010, ISBN 978-3-0346-0607-3
- Flora Samuel, 2018, Why Architects Matter: Evidencing and Communicating the Value of Architects (London, Routledge)
- Anne Dye and Flora Samuel, Demystifying Architectural Research (London: RIBA Enterprises, 2015)
