= Dean Hawkes =

British architect and academic (1938–2026)

- Born: 1938; Rochdale, Lancashire, England
- Died: 4 October 2026 (aged 87–88)
- Education: University of Cambridge
- Occupations: Architect; academic

Dean Hawkes (1938 – 4 October 2026) was a British architect and award-winning academic. His career combined practice, teaching and research.

== Life and career ==
Born in Rochdale, Lancashire in 1938, Hawkes studied at Regional College of Art, Manchester (Manchester School of Art) and Clare College, University of Cambridge.

From 1965 to 1995, he taught and researched at the Department of Architecture at the University of Cambridge, where he was a founder member and, later, Director of the Martin Centre for Architectural and Urban Studies. He held the Chair of Architectural Design at the Welsh School of Architecture, Cardiff University from 1995 – 2002. He held visiting professorships at the Chinese University of Hong Kong, the National University of Singapore, the Mackintosh School of Architecture, Glasgow School of Art, the Department of Architecture, Huddersfield University and the Leicester School of Architecture, De Montfort University. He was emeritus professor at Cardiff University and an emeritus fellow of Darwin College, University of Cambridge.

Hawkes was in practice between 1982 and 1994 with Stephen Greenberg as Greenberg and Hawkes. Projects were widely published and won a number of RIBA Architecture Awards. They were exhibited at the Royal Academy of Arts, London and at the Venice Biennale.

He published numerous books and essays on architecture and contributed to many journals, including the Architects' Journal and the Architectural Review.

Hawkes died on 4 October 2026.

== Awards ==
In 2000 Dean Hawkes received the international PLEA Award in recognition of his contribution to teaching, practice and research in the field of passive, low-energy architecture. In 2010 Dean Hawkes was awarded the Royal Institute of British Architects (RIBA) Annie Spink Award for architectural education. The honour is awarded by the RIBA biannually to those who have made a significant contribution to architectural education. He was described by the chair of the judging panel as "one of the most pre-eminent thinkers in architectural education" who had "an exceptional commitment to the environmental agenda from a time when this was not fashionable or mainstream thinking". In December 2016 Dean Hawkes was awarded an honorary Doctorate of Letters by the University of Westminster, London.

== Key publications ==
- D. Hawkes, J. Owers [1982] The Architecture of Energy, Longman, London.
- Dean Hawkes (1986) Modern Country Homes in England, Cambridge University Press, Cambridge. Paperback edition, (2011).
- Dean Hawkes [1995] The Environmental Tradition, Spon Press, London.
- Dean Hawkes, Jane McDonald, and Koen Steemers, [2001] The Selective Environment: An Approach to Environmentally Responsive Architecture, Taylor & Francis, London.
- D. Hawkes, Arup Partnership, W. Forster [2002] Energy Efficient Buildings: Architecture, Engineering, and Environment, W. W. Norton & Company, London.
- Dean Hawkes [2008] The Environmental Imagination, Spon Press, London.
- Dean Hawkes (2012) Architecture and Climate, Routledge, London.
- Dean Hawkes (2019) The Environmental Imagination, 2nd Edition, Routledge, London.
- Dean Hawkes (2021) The Architect and the Academy, Routledge, London.

== Key buildings ==
- House and Studio, Doughty Mews, Bloomsbury, London.
- House, Gisborne Road, Cambridge.
- House, Dottery, Dorset.
- Library, Maldon, Essex.
- Principal's Lodge, Newnham College, Cambridge.
