= Akkana Basadi =

Ancient Jain temple at Shravanbelgola

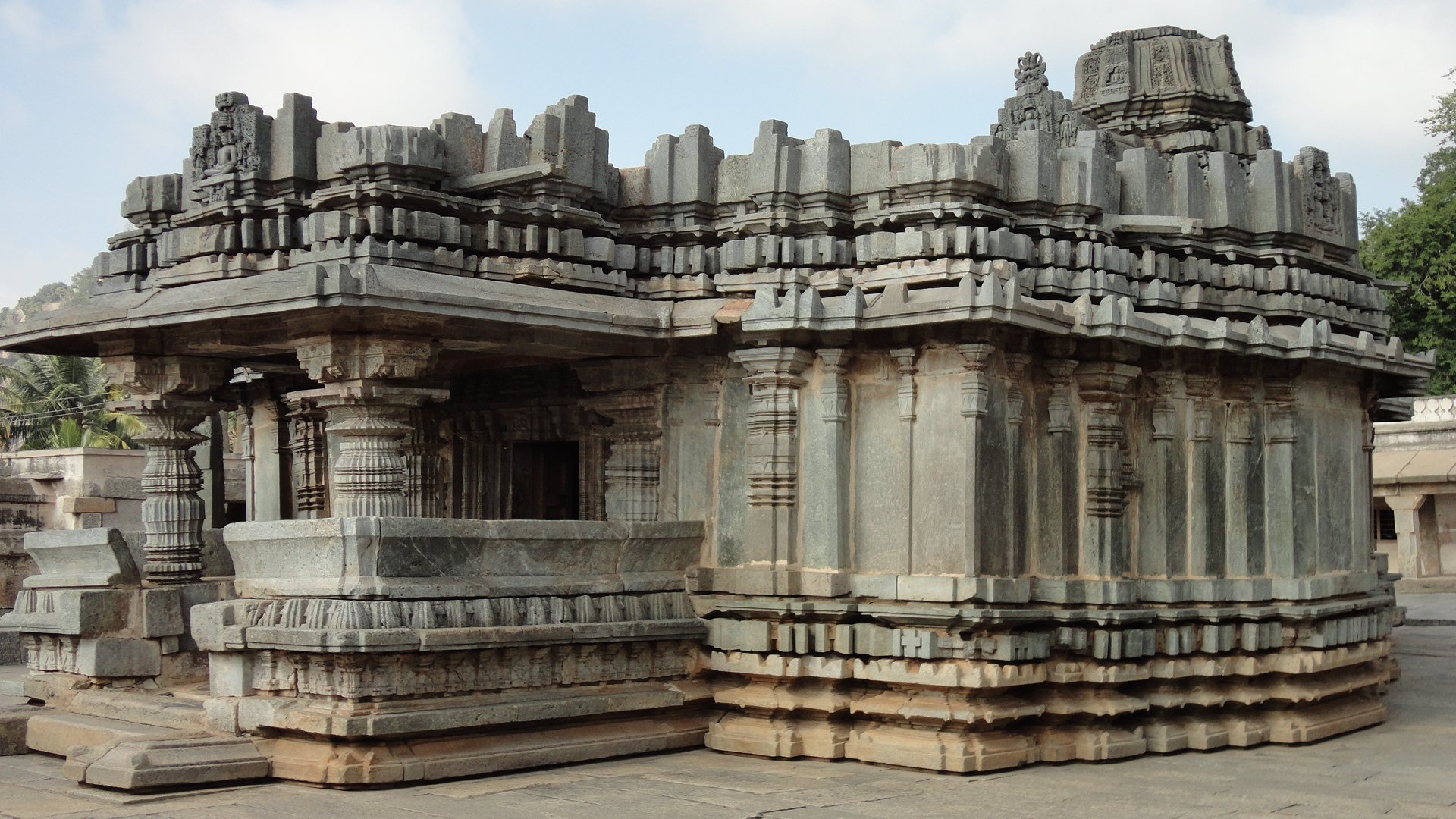
- Akkana Basadi at Shravanabelagola town

Religion
- Affiliation: Jainism
- Deity: Parshwanath
- Festival: Mahavir Jayanti

Location
- Location: Shravanabelagola, Hassan district, Karnataka
- Interactive map of Akkana Basadi
- Coordinates: 12°51′31.84″N 76°29′20.61″E

Architecture
- Style: Hoysala architecture
- Creator: Achala Devi
- Established: 1181 A.D.

Akkana Basadi (lit, temple of the "elder sister", basadi is also pronounced basti) is a Jain temple (basadi) built in 1181 A.D., during the rule of Hoysala empire King Veera Ballala II. The basadi was constructed by the devout Jain lady Achiyakka (also called Achala Devi), wife of Chandramouli, a Brahmin minister in the court of the Hoysala king. The main deity of the temple is the twenty-third Jain Tirthankar Parshwanath. The temple is protected as a monument of national importance by the Archaeological Survey of India. It is part of an Archaeological Survey of India Adarsh Smarak Monument along with other temples in the Shravanabelagola group of monuments.

== Temple plan ==
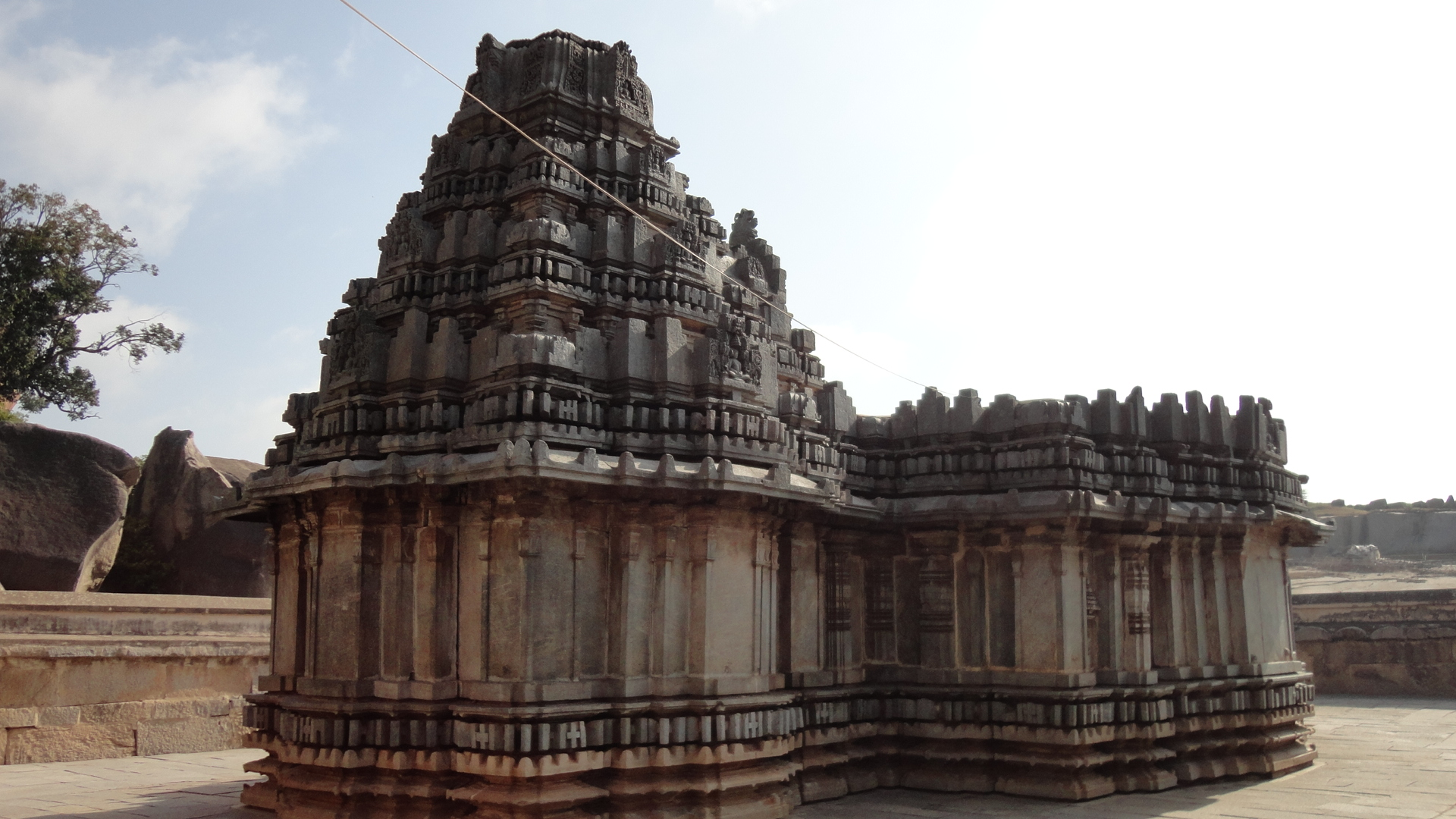
Rear view of Akkana Basadi at Shravanabelagola

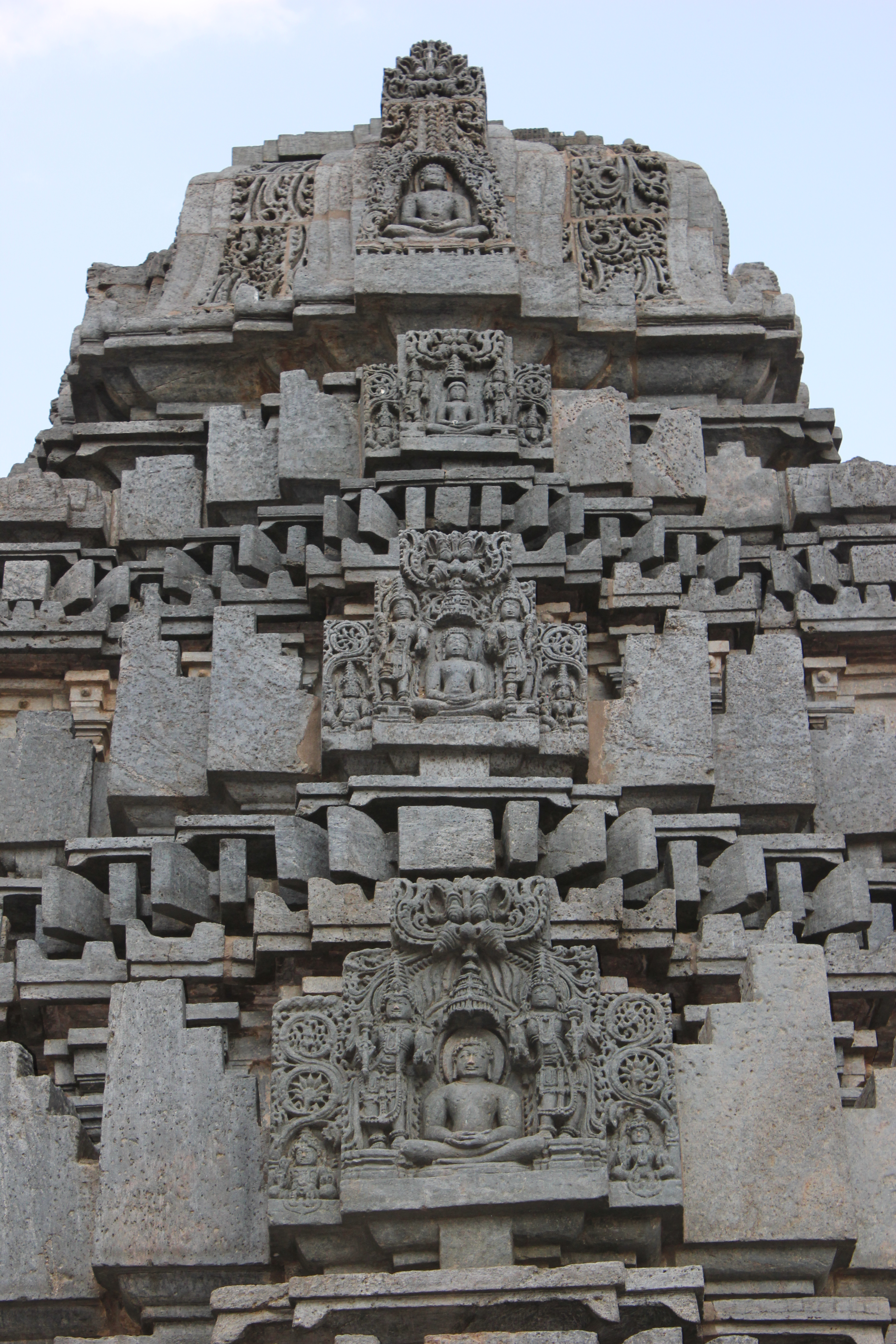
Kirtimukha relief on vesara shikhara (tower over shrine) at Akkana Basadi in Shravanabelagola

According to art historian Adam Hardy, the basadi is a simple single shrine with superstructure (ekakuta vimana) construction with a closed hall (mantapa). The material used is Soap stone. The sanctum (garbhagriha) that houses the standing image of Tirthankara Parshwanatha (under a seven headed snake canopy) connects to the hall via an antechamber (vestibule or sukanasi). From the outside, the entrance to the hall is through a porch whose awning is supported by lathe turned half pillars. According to art historians Percy Brown and Gerard Foekema, all these features are commonly found in Hoysala temples. According to historian Kamath, the use of Soap stone as basic building material was a technique the Hoysalas adopted from the predecessors, the Western Chalukyas. The temple which faces east is enclosed with in a bounding wall (prakara), while the entrance is from the south. Typical of a Jain basadi, the outer walls of the temple are plain, giving it an austere outlook. The temple stands on a base (adhisthana) that comprises five moldings.

The tower over the shrine (shikhara) is plain. However, on a projection on the east side is a panel sculpture in relief that depicts a saint with his attendants (yaksha, the benevolent spirits) on either side and a Kirtimukha (imaginary beast) over his head. This is a work of merit. The tower comprises three tiers, each ascending tier diminishing in height. Above the third tier is a dome like structure. This is the largest sculptural piece in the temple with a ground surface area of about 2x2 meters (amalaka, "helmet" like structure). The shape of the dome usually follows that of the shrine (square or star shape). The vestibule also has a short tower which looks like an extension of the main tower over the shrine. Gerard Foekema calls it the "nose" of the main tower. The temple features a 5 feet (1.5 m) idol of Parshvanatha sheltered by seven hooded serpent. The vestibule contains two free sculptures of the yakshas, Dharnendra and Padmavati. The door lintel and jamb of vestibule and the sanctum are decorative and have perforated screens on either side. The hall ceiling is supported by four centrally placed large lathe turned, bell shaped and polished pillars that divide the ceiling into nine "bays". The bay ceilings are rich in relief.

== Gallery ==
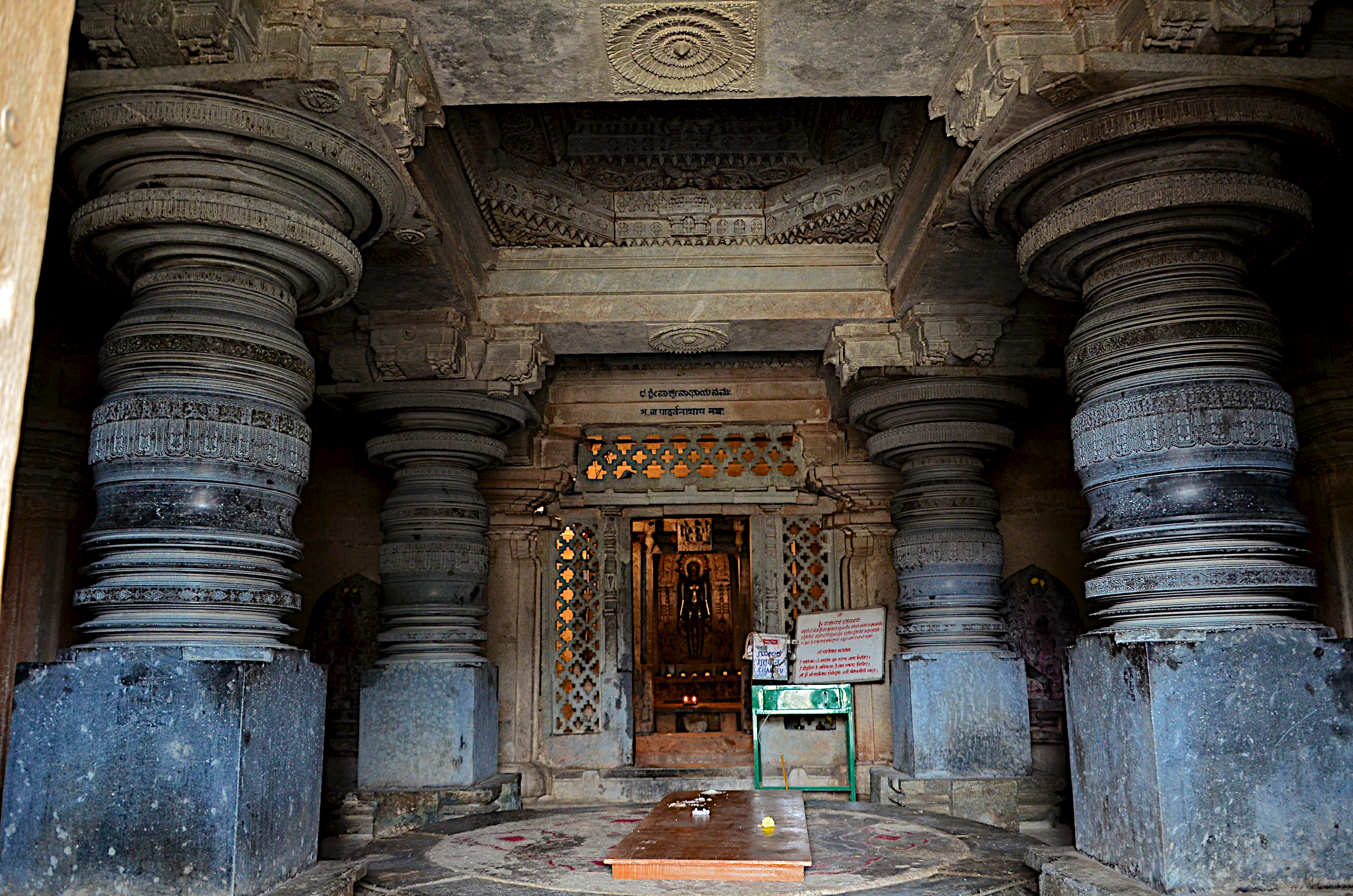
Ornate closed mantapa whose ceiling is supported by lathe turned bell shaped pillars

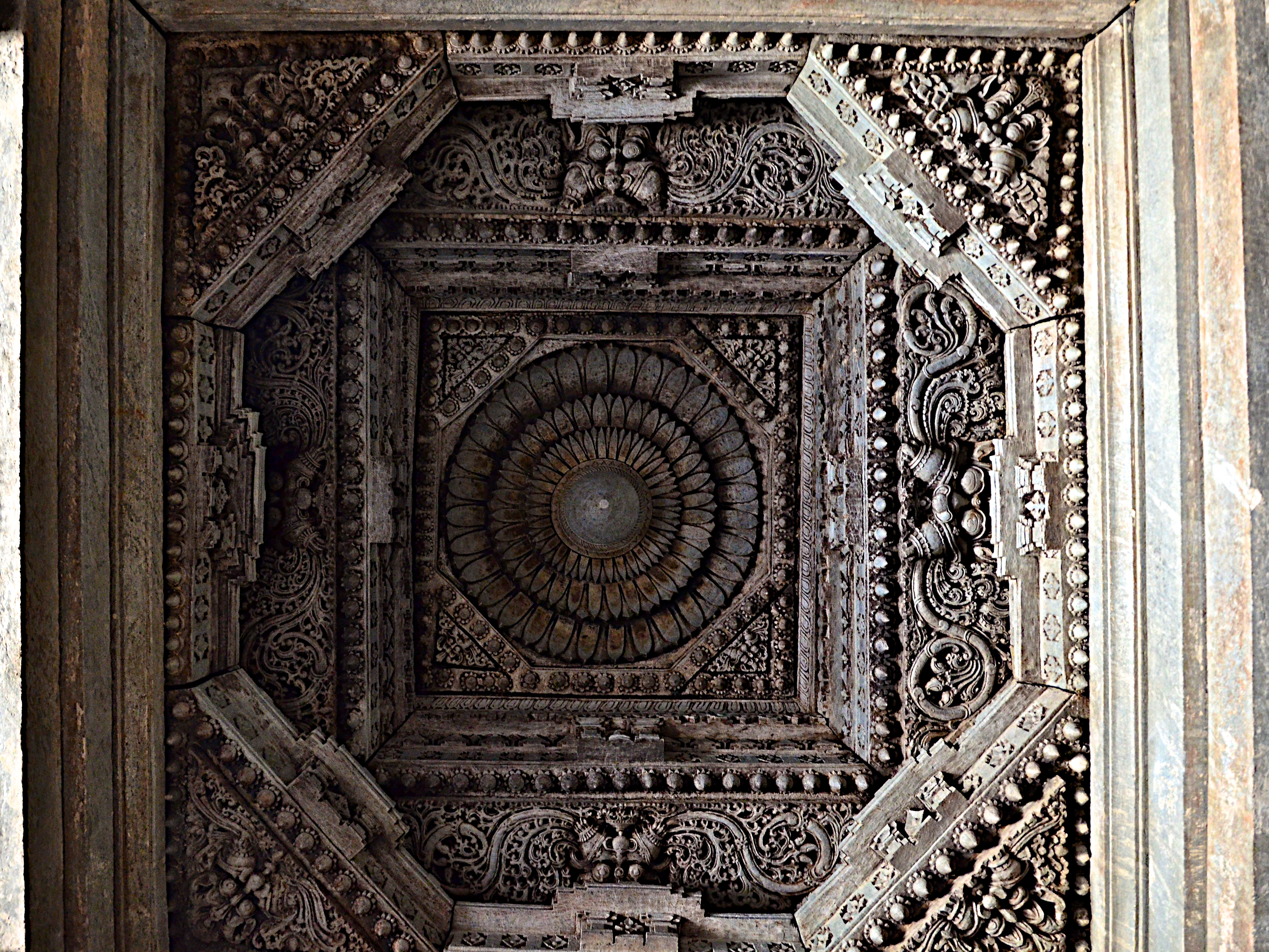
Decorative "bay" ceiling in Akkana Basadi

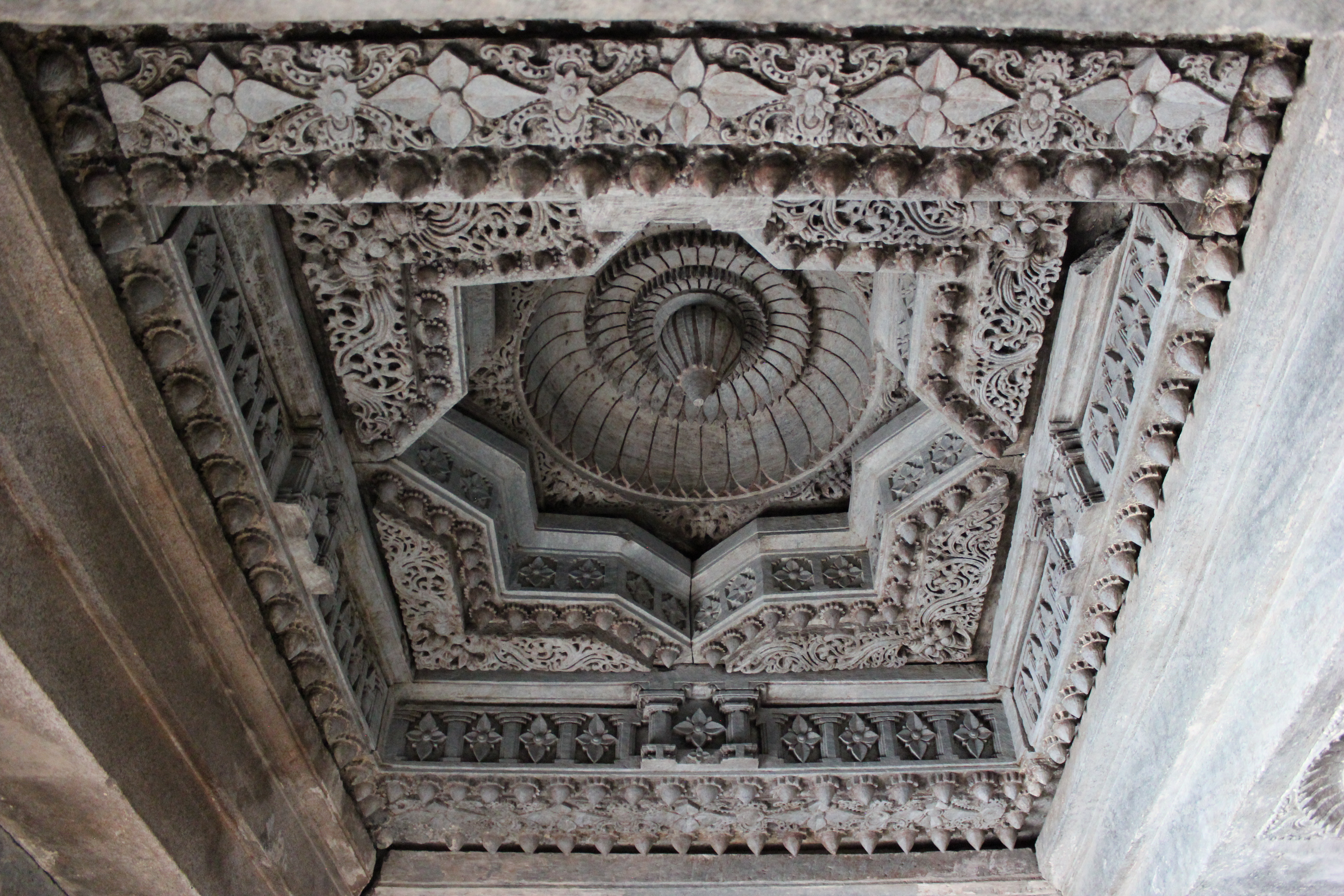
Decorative bay ceiling

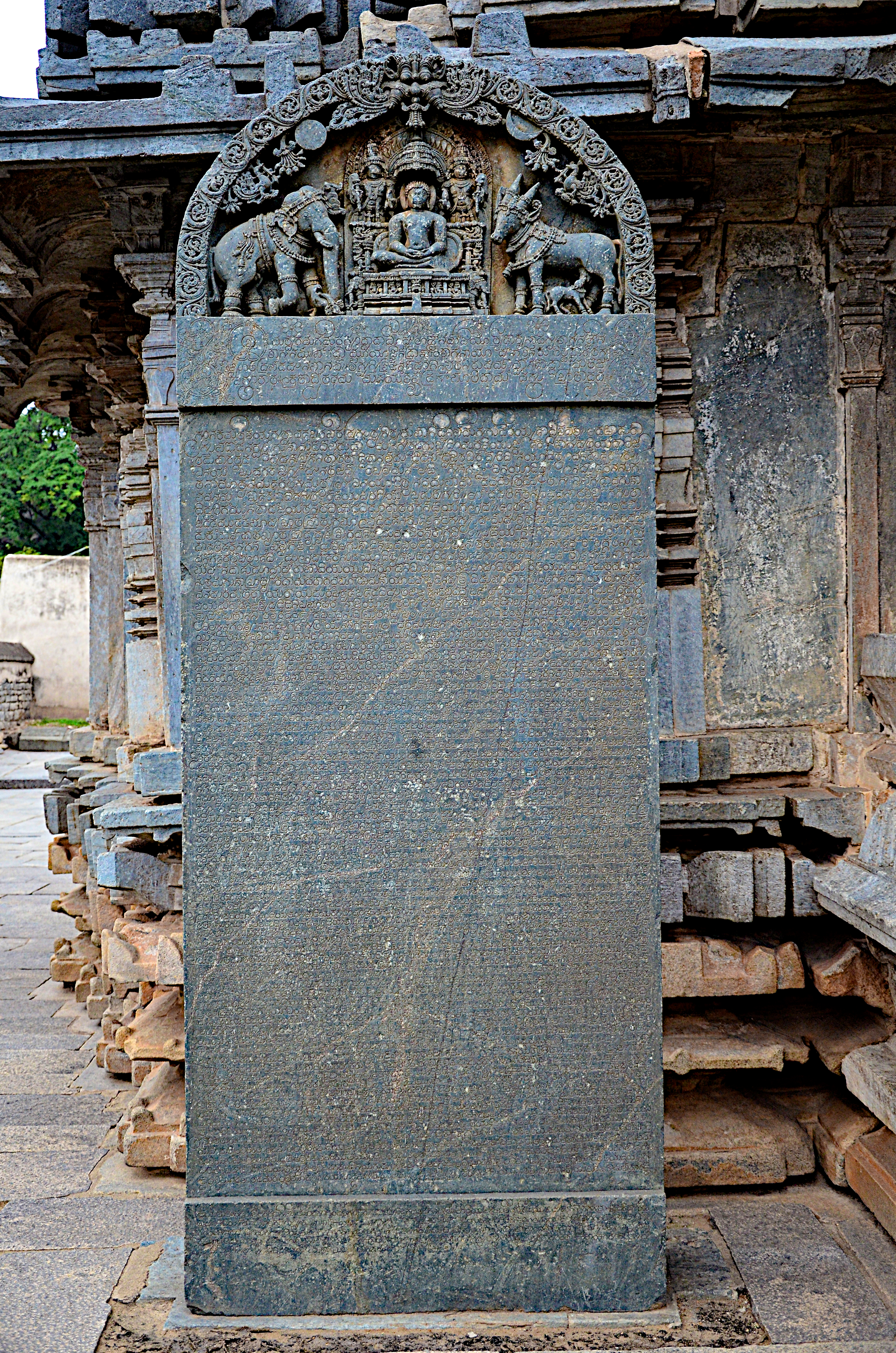
Old Kannada grant inscription (1182 A.D.) of King Veera Ballala II, at the request of Achiyakka, wife of minister Chandramouli

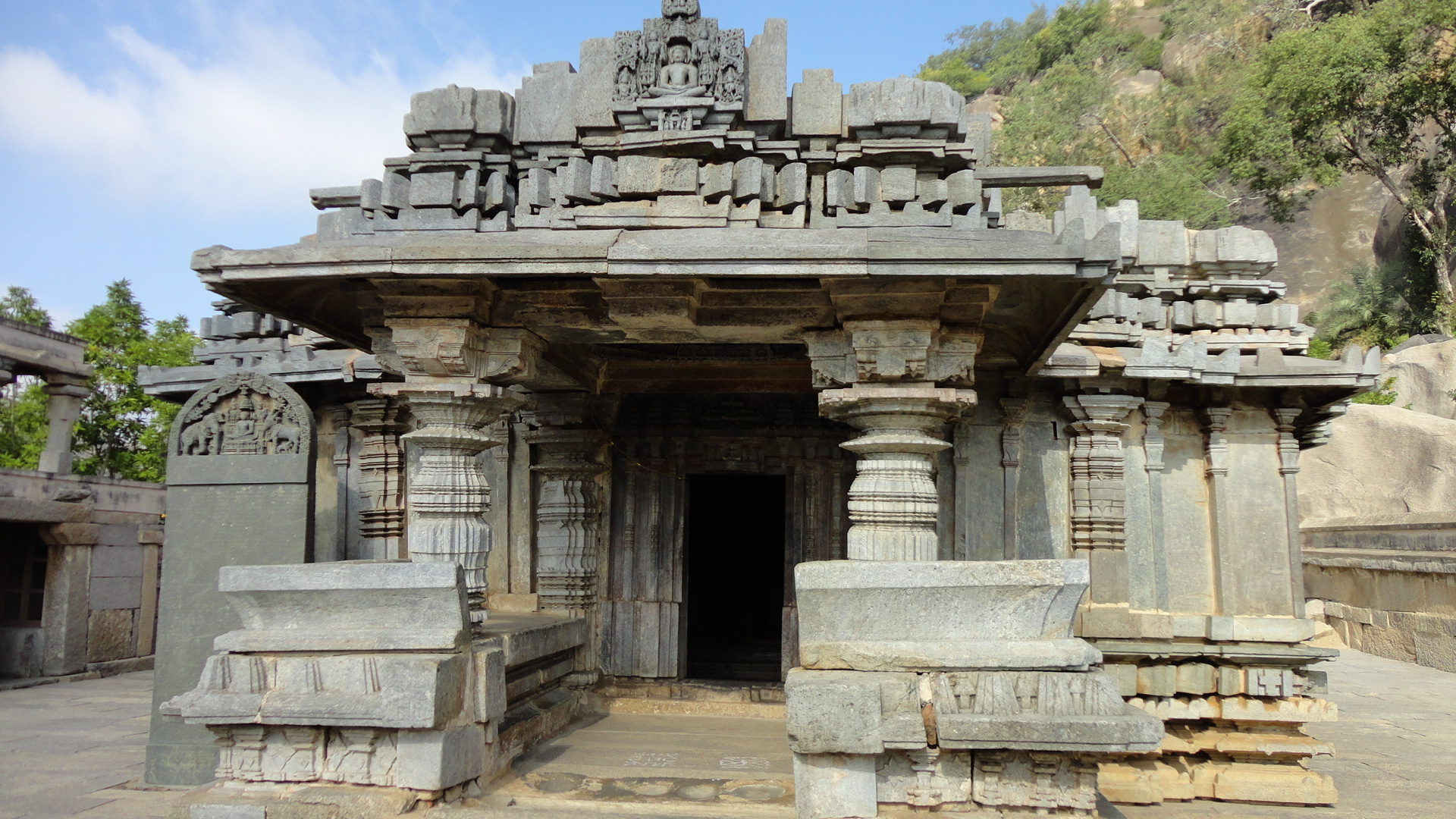
Porch entrance to Akkana Basadi with the awning supported by half pillars with old Kannada inscription on the side.

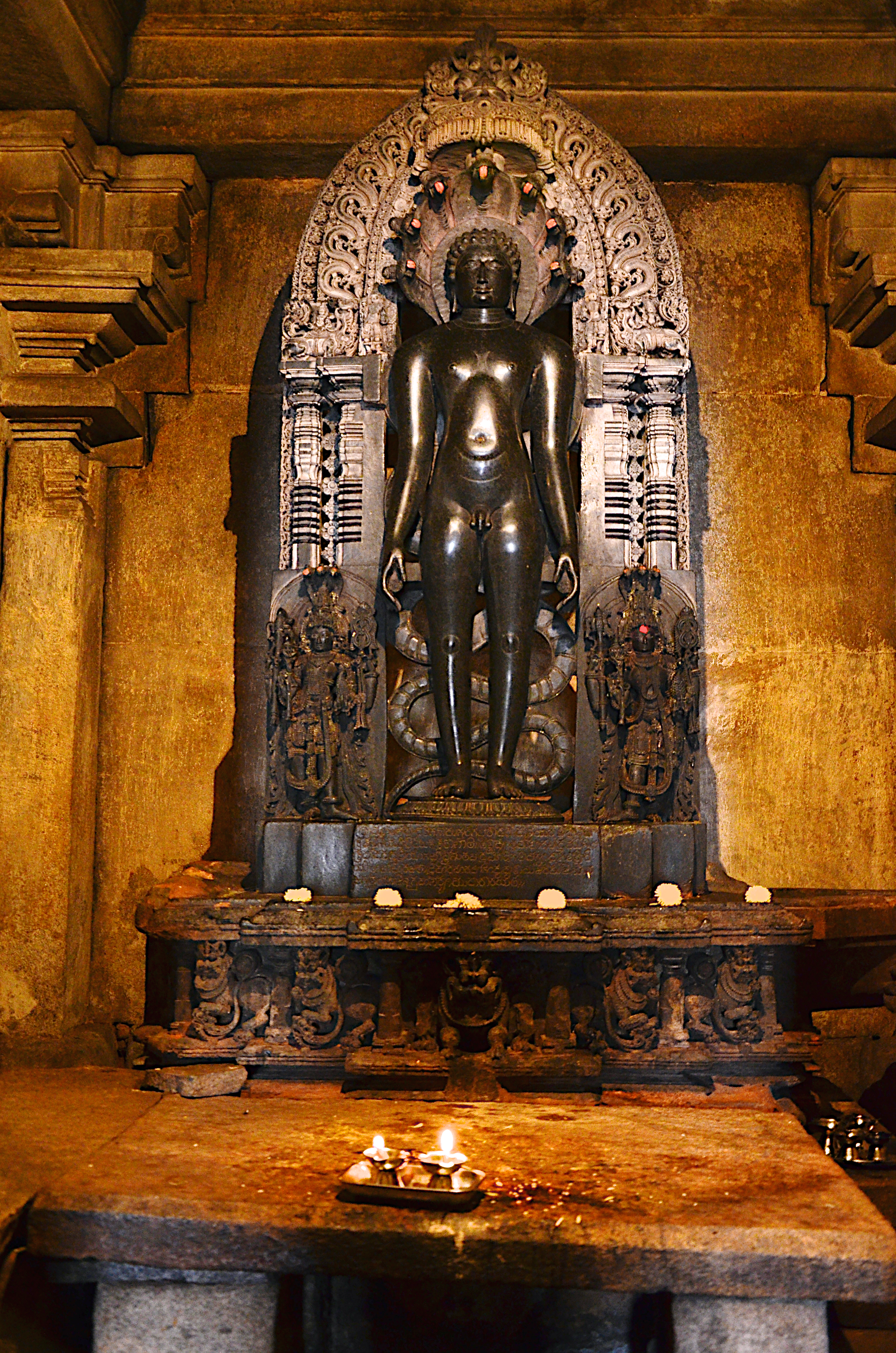
5 feet tall idol of the 23rd Tirthankar Parshwanath standing under a seven headed snake

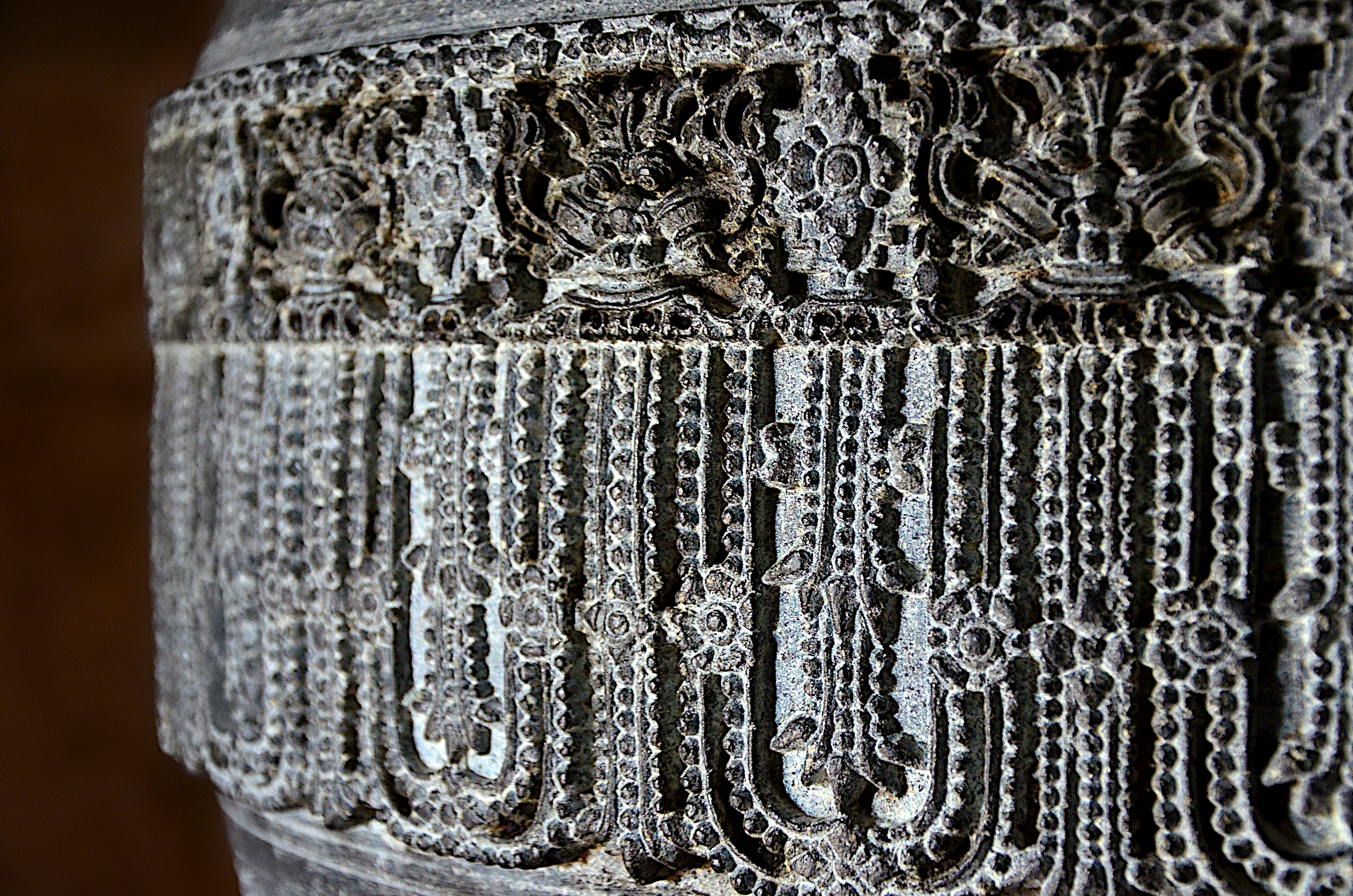
Intricate relief on pillar at Akkana Basadi

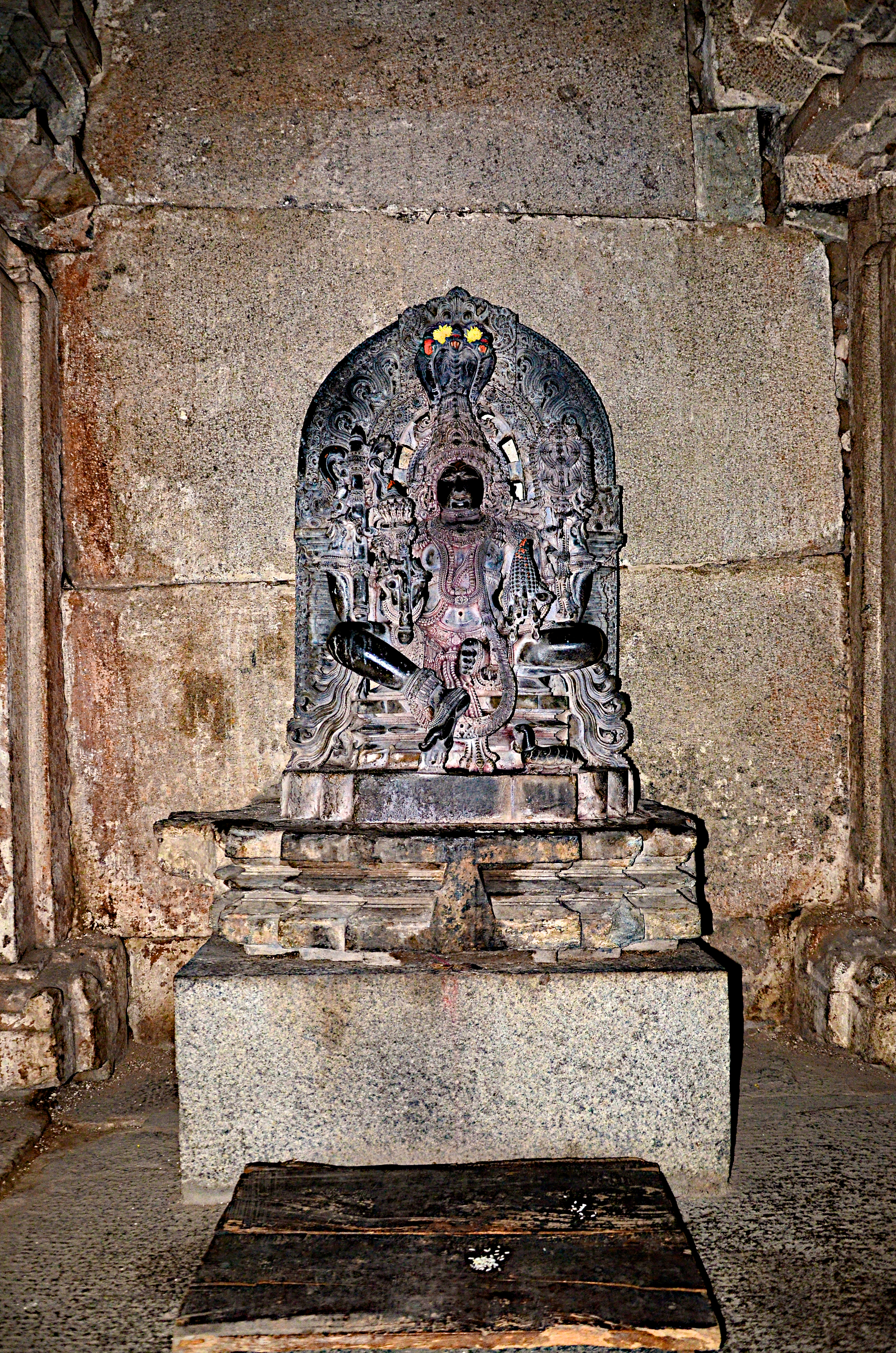
Sculpture of Yaksha Dharanendra

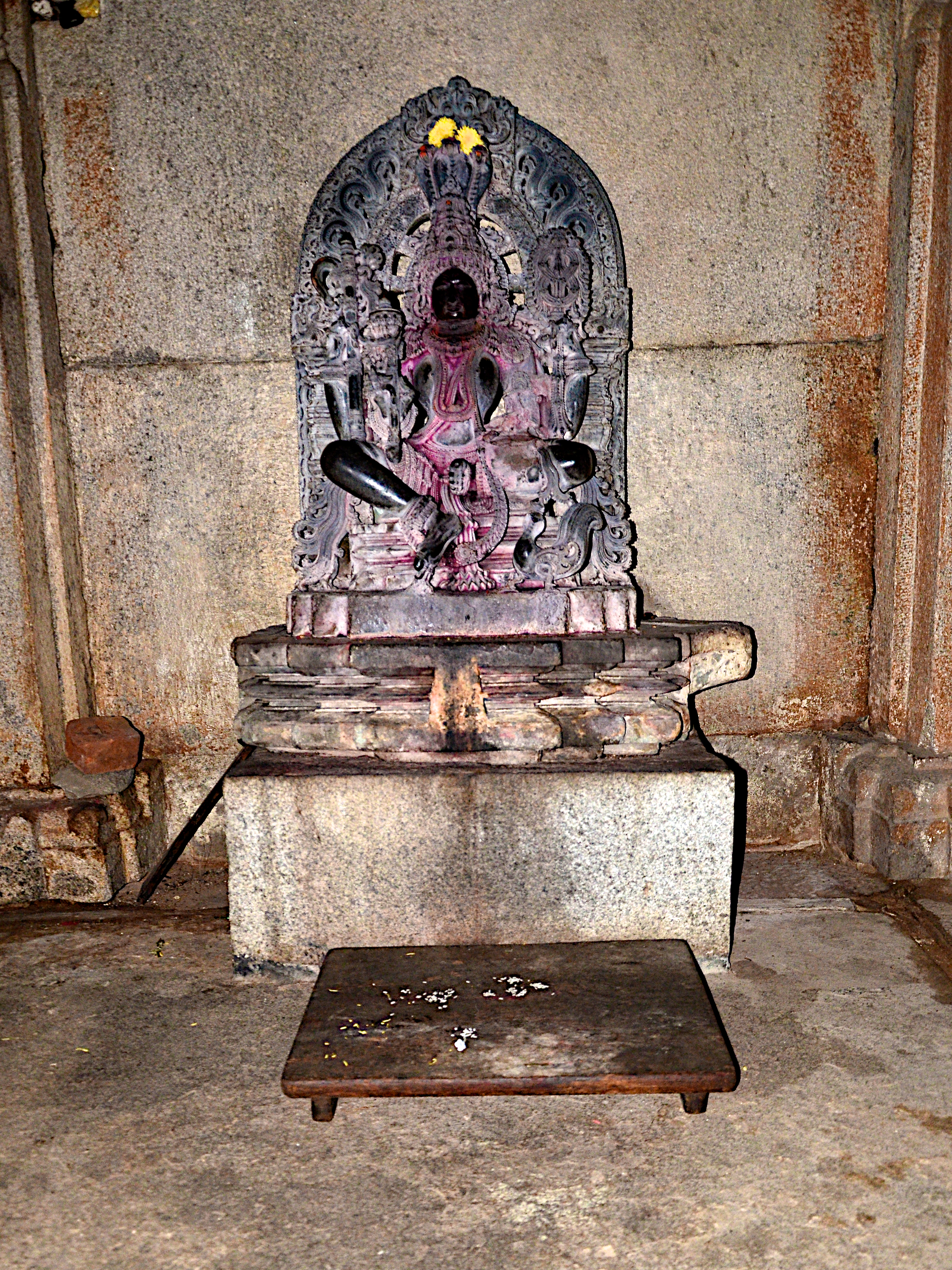
Sculpture of Yakshi Padmavati

== See also ==
- Bhandara Basadi
- Jain Basadi complex, Halebidu
- Shravanabelagola
- Parshvanatha basadi, Shravanabelgola
