= Kawamura-ganjavian =

Architecture studio in Spain and Switzerland

Studio kawamura-ganjavian
- Industry: Architecture / Product Design / Urbanism
- Founded: 2000
- Founder: Key Portilla-Kawamura and Ali Ganjavian
- Headquarters: Spain + Switzerland, Madrid + Lausanne
- Website: http://www.studiokg.com

Key Kawamura

kawamura-ganjavian, also known as studio kg, is an architecture and design studio based in Madrid, Spain, and Lausanne, Switzerland.

== Story ==
Key Portilla-Kawamura (Oviedo, 1979) and Ali Ganjavian (Teheran, 1979) met while studying at the University of East London in the mid-1990s, and continued their postgraduate studies at the Architectural Association and the Royal College of Art in London. They have worked in Tokyo with Kazuyo Sejima, in Basel with Herzog & de Meuron, in TBV School of Habitat in New Delhi and Lee-Wimpenny in New York.

kawamura-ganjavian was established in 2000 in London by Kawamura and Ganjavian and moved to Madrid in 2006. Currently, In 2006, they also founded in Madrid the multidisciplinary creative platform Studio Banana which currently hosts 40 young professionals working in different creative disciplines. In 2007 together with some members of Studio Banana they founded Studio Banana TV, an on-line audiovisual platform dedicated to the promotion of culture and creativity. As well, every two Thursdays there are a cultural event as a projection, a performance or an exhibition.

== Description ==
kawamura-ganjavian developed projects worldwide, from ephemeral experiments such as Locutorio Colón, through a range of building types like the Aravaca psychiatric clinic, to large scale territorial studies. Several of their projects are spaces dedicated to exhibiting art, such as Iniciarte (Madrid, 2009). They are also known for developing a line of design products which includes pieces of furniture and small accessories.

kawamura-ganjavian has participated in conferences, workshops and exhibitions in Europe, Asia and South America. Their work has been published in international magazines and books of architecture and design. They have been directors of the European Design Labs master course at the Istituto Europeo di Design in Madrid and have taught at the Accademia di Architettura di Mendrisio in Switzerland. They have been guest jurors at the UEL London, The Bartlett School London, ETH Zürich and École Polytechnique Fédérale de Lausanne schools of architecture.

== Projects ==
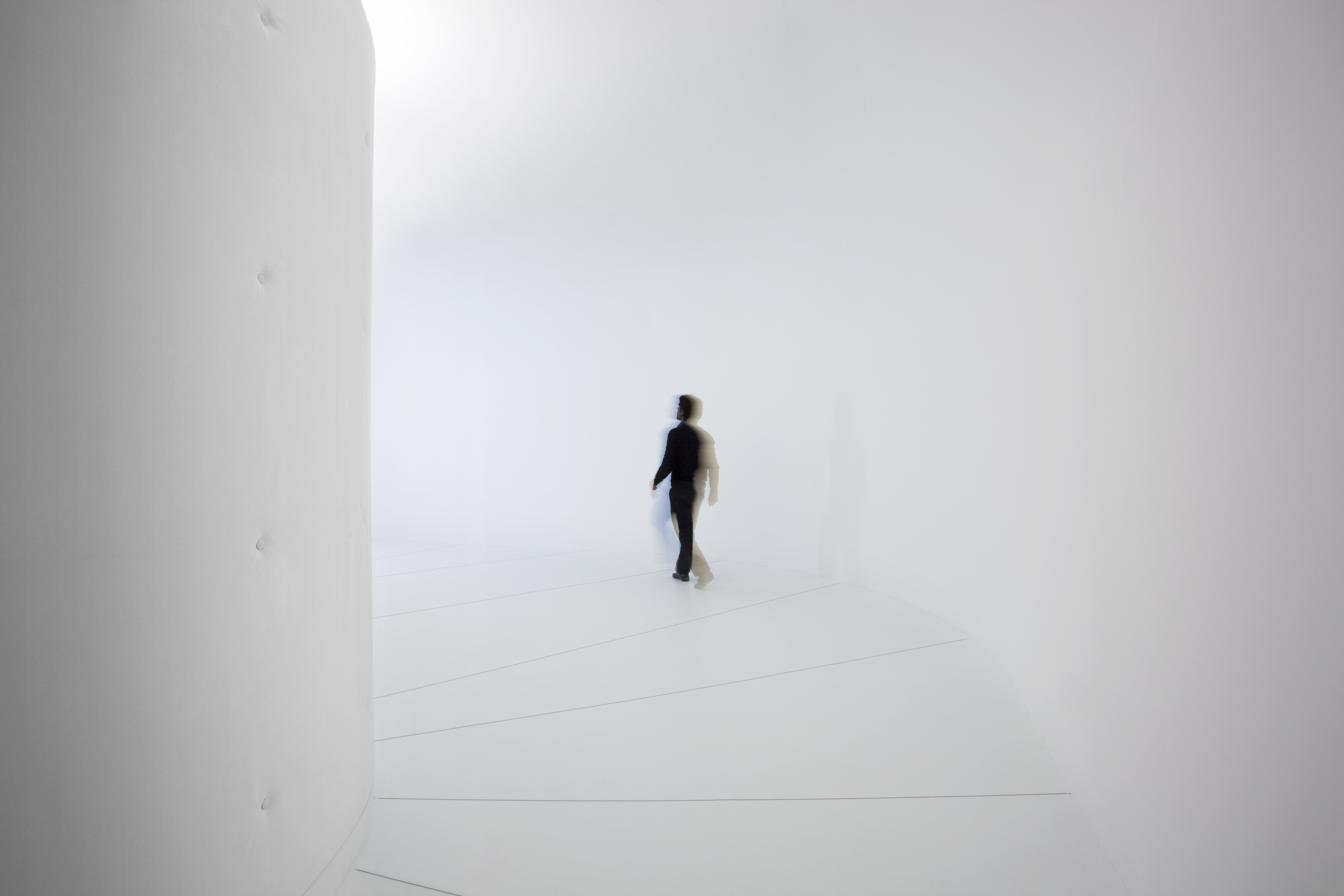
Iniciarte, 2009.

=== Spaces ===
- Process as Paradigm. Exhibition space. LABoral art centre. Gijón, Spain; 2010
- Madrid Abierto info point. Madrid, Spain; 2010
- Librairie la Fontaine. Fitting of a bookstore. Lausanne, Switzerland; 2009-2010.
- Iniciarte. Art institution stand. Madrid, Spain; 2009. Collaboration with Ramiro Losada.
- Studio Banana. Transformation of workshop into creative studio. Madrid, Spain; 2007.
- Locutorio Colon. Public art commission. Madrid, Spain; 2005-2006. Collaboration with Maki Portilla-Kawamura and Tadanori Yamaguchi.
- Limac. Exhibition space. León, Spain; 2005.
- Room under a Slagheap. Contemplative space in a valley. Turón, Spain; 2002-2004. Collaboration with Maki Portilla-Kawamura, Tadanori Yamaguchi and Pedro Escobio.
- Musik Didactique. Multimedia exhibition. Zurich, Switzerland; 2003.
- Arco Madrid. Spatial design of art fair. Madrid, Spain; 2001. Collaboration with Vicente Salvador.

=== Territories ===
- Asturegion Territorial Lab. Territorial study. Asturias, Spain; 2008.
- Retroactive Simulacrum. Urban proposal. Quito, Ecuador; 2003.
- Space search engine. Urban study. London, UK, 2002.

=== Products ===
- Read in Peace
- Caterpillar
- Caterpillar Trestles
- Stickingrings
- Stickingsticks
- Plug on
- Eat with your fingers
- Scenter
- Giraffe
- Flword
- Earshell
- Ostrich Pillow

=== Teaching ===
- European Design Labs Master course directors, 2009. Istituto Europeo di Design, Madrid.
- DIY Studio workshop tutors, 2009. Centro Cultural Parque de España, Rosario, Argentina.
- Guest jurors at Atelier Marc Angelil, 2008. ETH Zurich Faculty of Architecture, Zurich.
- Atelier Riuso, Martin Boesch tutor assistants, 2007-2008. Accademia di Architettura, Università della Svizzera Italiana, Mendrisio, Switzerland.
- Cartographic Fantasies workshop, 2004. Universität Kassel, Germany.
- Guest jurors at Dip 10 Charles Tashima, 2004. AA School of Architecture, London.

== Publications ==
- Madrid: A Monocle City Survey. Taylor, S. 'practice: kawamura-ganjavian', Monocle, no.29, vol.03, London, December09-January10, p. 94 (en)
- Transcript of presentation at City and Art Forum. "Art and Design Practicds in Reference to City and Art - II", Mimar Sinan University, Istanmbul, 2009, pp. 107–133 (en).
- The Independent Design Guide, Selection of prominent contemporary design published by Thames&Hudson and edited by the former architecture and design editor of Wallpaper magazine. 'Heat me' and 'Divide It', in Housley L. (ed.), 'The Independent Design Guide', Thames & Hudson, London, 2009, pp. 299 and 310.
- 1000 interior details for the home, 'Kaleidolight' in, Rudge, I. and Rudge, G. (ed.), '1000 Interior Details for the Home', Laurence King, London, 2009, p. 300.
