= Peter Salter =

British architectural designer and academic (born 1947)

Peter Salter (born 1947) is a British architectural designer and academic. In 1962 he began a course at the Shoreditch College of Furnishing Trades, in preparation to become a furniture designer. In 1964, he worked as a junior draftsman for a patent glazing manufacturer. From 1966 until he began his studies at the Architectural Association School of Architecture, Salter worked as an architectural technician for a number of local authorities in London. He studied and taught at the Architectural Association School of Architecture, where he received his Diploma in 1980, was Head of the School of Architecture at the University of East London and since 2006 has been Professor of Architectural Design at the Welsh School of Architecture, Cardiff University. He is currently practicing as Salter+Collingridge

== Career in practice ==
In the early 1980s, Peter Salter worked for Alison and Peter Smithson, founding members of Team X, the successor group to CIAM.

In the 1980s, Salter collaborated with Christopher Macdonald (former Director of the University of British Columbia School of Architecture) under the name Macdonald and Salter. They produced a series of speculative projects that remain unbuilt. The projects are well known for their highly developed and evocative drawings, which are concerned with qualities of construction and spatial atmosphere. In 1990, Macdonald and Salter designed a temporary building, a folly, for the International Garden and Greenery Exposition in Osaka. Other contributors to the Exposition included Peter Cook and Christine Hawley, Architektburo Bolles-Wilson, Morphosis, Coop Himmelb(l)au, and Zaha Hadid, among others.

Salter is currently in practice with Fenella Collingridge as Salter+Collingridge.

Salter+Collingridge have recently completed Walmer Yard, an award-winning series of 4 bespoke houses for developer Crispin Kelly of Baylight Properties. Kelly was a former student of Salter.

== Academic career ==
In the 1980s and 1990s Salter taught at the Architectural Association, where he also earned his Diploma. While at the AA, he often served as Unit Master with Christopher Macdonald, which led them to the design collaboration under the name Macdonald and Salter.

In 1995 Salter took over from Ron Herron (a member of the design partnership Archigram) as the professor and Head of School at the University of East London. Salter has since taught at the University of Bath and has been Professor of Architectural design at the Welsh School of Architecture, Cardiff University. In 2004 Salter won the Royal Institute of British Architects Annie Spink award for his outstanding contribution to architectural education. This prize was awarded jointly with Wolf Prix.

== Publications ==
- eds. Pamela Johnston, et al. [2005] Architecture is not made with the brain: The labour of Alison and Peter Smithson, Architectural Association Publications, London
- Peter Salter [2000] 4 + 1: Peter Salter Building Projects, Black Dog Publishing, London.
- Ed. Robin Middleton [1996] The Idea of the City, Architectural Association Publications, London.
- Peter Smithson and Peter Salter [1994] Climate Register, Architectural Association Publications, London.

== Buildings ==
- Osaka Folly
- 6E School of Architecture, Bath, for the Smithsons
- Thai Fish Restaurant
- Kamiichi Mountain Pavilion
- Inami Woodcarving Museum
- "Folly" project for Glasgow's Year of Architecture
- Walmer Yard, Notting Hill, London
