= Bhandara Basadi =

Jain temple in Shravanabelgola complex in the state of Karnataka

- ಭಂಡಾರ ಬಸದಿ
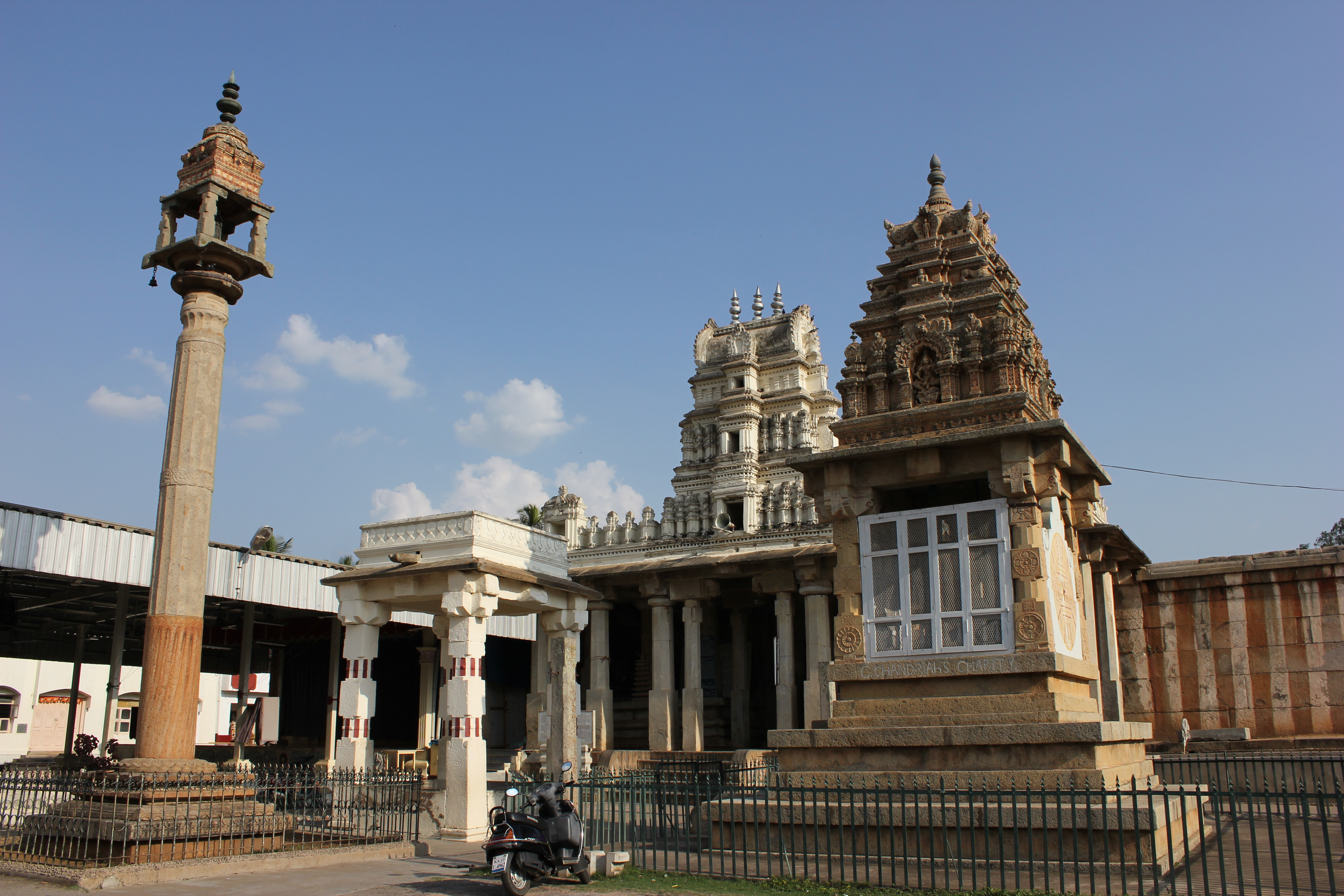
- Bhandara Basadi

Religion
- Affiliation: Jainism
- Deity: Tirthankara
- Festival: Mahavir Jayanti

Location
- Location: Shravana Belgola, Hassan, Karnataka
- Interactive map of Bhandara Basadi
- Coordinates: 12°51′24.1″N 76°29′19.4″E

Architecture
- Style: Hoysala architecture
- Creator: Hula Raja
- Established: 1159 CE

Bhandara Basadi or Chaturvimsati Tirthankar Basadi is a Jain temple (basadi) built in located in Shravanabelagola, a town in Karnataka, India. The temple was constructed by Hulla, the treasurer and chief minister of the Hoysala king Narasimha I, and was dedicated to the twenty-four Tirthankaras.

== History ==
The temple was constructed in 1159 CE by Hula Raja, a general and bhandari (transl. treasurer) during the reign of King Narasimha I of Hoysala Empire, giving temple the name Bhandara Basadi. The construction of the temple is recorded in an inscription at Shravanabelagola. The record describes Hulla as the bhandari (treasurer) and sarvadhikari (chief minister) of the Hoysala king Narasimha and records his erection of the Bhandari Basadi at Belgola. Hulla was an important Jain patron under the Hoysalas. The inscription records the construction of a temple dedicated to the twenty-four Tirthankaras, which became popularly known as the Bhandari Basadi after his office as royal treasurer. According to inscription, dating back to 1159 CE, inside the temple gave grants for the temple and gave the name Bhavya-Chamundi temple. 'The inscriptional evidence also records royal patronage of the Jain establishment. Narasimha granted the village of Savaneru for the worship of Gommateshwara, Parshvanatha and the twenty-four Tirthankaras installed by Hulla, and appointed the Jain teacher Nayakirti as the acharya associated with the establishment.

Another inscription records Hulla's donation of lands for the worship of Gommateshwara, Parshvanatha and the twenty-four Tirthankaras. Hulla's patronage at Shravanabelagola extended beyond Bhandara Basadi. An inscription dated 1163 CE records that he erected a memorial for his teacher Devakirti and that it was consecrated by Devakirti's disciples Lakshmananandi, Madhava and Tribhuvanadeva. One inscription inside the temple records a major dispute between Vaishnav and Jain and its resolution by King Bukka of Vijayanagara Empire. This inscription is dated to 1368 CE, during the reign of Bukka Raya I. It records the settlement of a dispute between the Jains and the Vaishnavas and is an important source for relations between religious communities under the early Vijayanagara rulers.

== Architecture ==
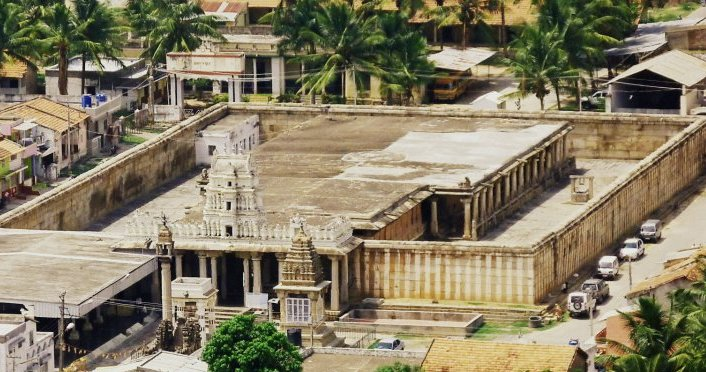
Aerial view of Bhandara Basadi

Bhandara Basadi is the largest temple in Shravanabelagola measuring 266 by 76 feet (81 by 23 m). The temple is dedicated to 24 Tirthankaras and is hence also known as Chaturvimsati Tirthankar Basadi. The dedication to all twenty-four Tirthankaras is also confirmed by the contemporary inscription recording Hulla's foundation. The garbhagriha houses 3 feet (0.91 m) idols of 24 Tirthankaras in kayotsarga posture with a ornate pedestal. There are idols of Padmavati and Brahmdev outside the garbhagriha. The temple also enshrines an idol of Parshavanatha with four-armed Dharaṇendra and Padmāvatī. The central part of navaranga (hall) floor contains a 10 feet (3.0 m) monolithic slab which popular in Hoysala architecture.

The temple also includes a monolithic manasthamba with chaturmukha idol facing four cardinal direction. The arrangement of twenty-four Jina images makes the temple a Chaturvimsati Tirthankara Basadi, a shrine collectively dedicated to all twenty-four Tirthankaras rather than to a single principal Jina.

== Inscriptions ==
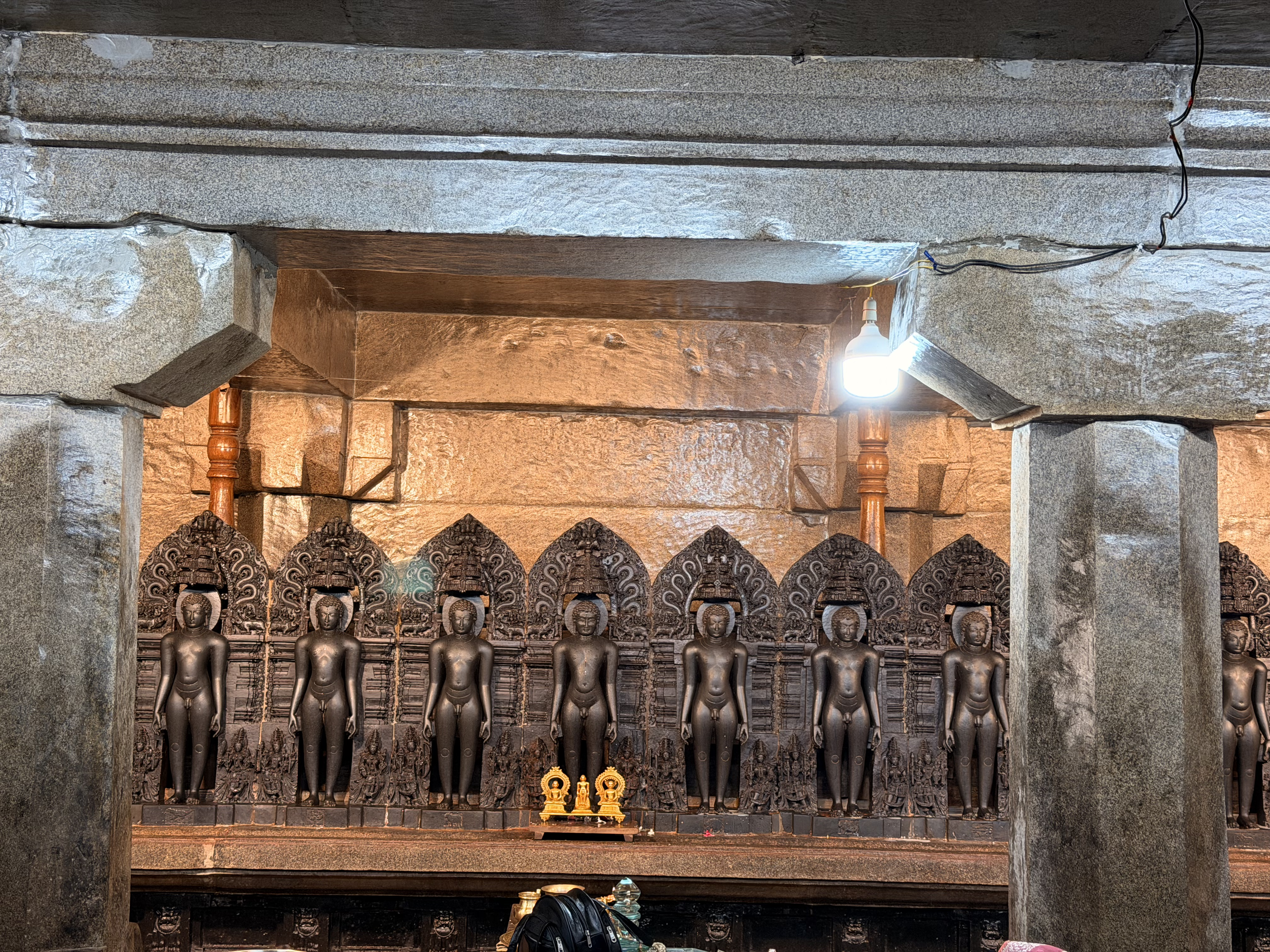
Main vedi

Bhandara Basadi and its associated monuments preserve several inscriptions important for reconstructing the history of Jain patronage at Shravanabelagola. An inscription dated to the reign of Narasimha I records that Hulla, the king's treasurer and chief minister, erected the Bhandari Basadi at Belgola. The temple contained images of the twenty-four Tirthankaras. The same group of records documents royal endowments for Jain worship. Narasimha assigned the village of Savaneru for the worship of Gommateshwara, Parshvanatha and the twenty-four Tirthankaras and appointed Nayakirti as acharya.

A related inscription records that Hulla donated lands for the worship of the same three objects of devotion. Another important inscription preserved at Bhandara Basadi dates to 1368 CE and records the settlement of a dispute between Jains and Vaishnavas during the reign of the Vijayanagara king Bukka Raya I. The 1368 record is a copy of another inscription found at Kalya and is particularly well preserved at Shravanabelagola.

== Patronage ==
Hulla was one of several prominent Jain officials serving the Hoysala rulers during the 12th century. In addition to constructing Bhandara Basadi, inscriptional records credit him with donations and religious foundations at Shravanabelagola. The patronage of Narasimha I is particularly significant because the king himself provided villages for the maintenance and worship of the Jain monuments associated with Hulla's foundation. The inscriptions therefore provide evidence for the close relationship between Jain religious institutions and high-ranking Hoysala officials at Shravanabelagola during the 12th century.

== See also ==
- Akkana Basadi
- Gommateshwara statue
- Chandragupta basadi
- Chavundaraya Basadi
