= Welsh School of Architecture =

Architecture school of Cardiff University

Coordinates: 51.4865°N 3.1827°W

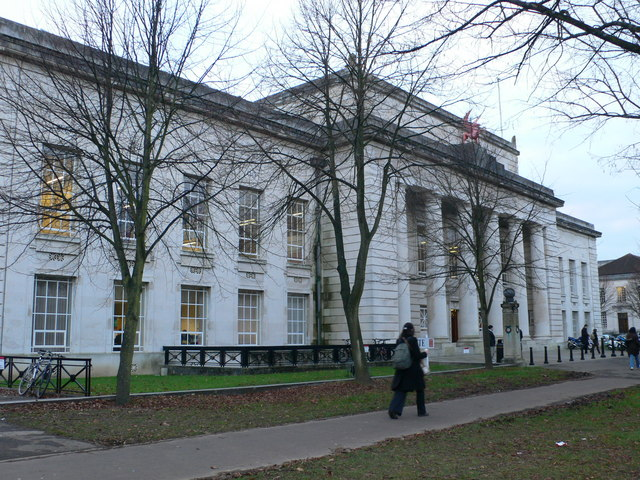
The Bute Building, home to the WSA

The Welsh School of Architecture (WSA) (Welsh: Ysgol Bensaernïaeth Cymru) is an academic school of Cardiff University. It is generally regarded as a world leading school of architecture, and one of the top architecture schools in Britain. In 2019, QS ranked the school immediately behind Ivy League school Princeton and ahead of Pennsylvania and Yale. The Welsh School of Architecture is currently listed as number 8 in the UK by The Guardian Rankings and number 5 by the Complete University Guide.

== Background ==
The Welsh School of Architecture was established in 1920 originally as Cardiff's Technical Institute (later part of the University of Wales Institute of Science and Technology).

For two years WSA was voted the UK's top School of Architecture in the Times Higher Education Supplement league table. In 2013, it was ranked second by The Guardian and, in a poll of architects carried out by the Architects' Journal, was ranked equal first with the Architectural Association as the top UK school. Its "intellectual, yet no-nonsense approach" to design embraces all aspects of architecture and is focused around the studio project, based on one-to-one design teaching. Academic staff are supported by visiting professors and tutors from local and leading UK practices.

The UK's largest Sky Dome, an artificial sky 8 metres in diameter run by the school and used for daylight modelling and sun-path studies, was built in the basement of the building in 1999.

In July 2013, the annual degree show of student work was for the first time held in London, at the Truman Gallery in Brick Lane. The 2015 show was described by The Observer as "more down to earth" than others but "motivated by a belief in betterment".

== Courses ==
The WSA offers an accredited BSc undergraduate degree in Architectural Studies. It condenses its Part II architecture course, which would normally involve 2 years of full-time study, into a year spent working in practice with part-time study modules, followed by 1 year full-time at college. The Part II doubles as a Master of Architecture qualification.

The school also offers a range of taught and research postgraduate courses including the Diploma in Professional Studies, an MA in Urban Design and Master of Science degrees in Sustainable Building Conservation or Sustainable Energy and Environment.

== Notable people and alumni ==
- Prof Dewi-Prys Thomas (1916–85) - a teacher and advocate for Wales and the built environment.
- Prof Dean Hawkes
- Prof Sarah Lupton – architect, arbitrator and author of numerous books on professional practice and law. Personal Chair at WSA.
- Prof Malcolm Parry – TV personality and former Head of the School of Architecture
- Prof Peter Salter
- Prof Flora Samuel – former lecturer at the school and author of books on Le Corbusier; head of the University of Sheffield School of Architecture (since 2010).
- Prof Simon Unwin – author of Analysing Architecture and other books. Former Senior Lecturer at the school.
- Prof Richard Weston – architect, author and designer. Current (2011) Chair of Architecture at WSA.
- Prof Alan Lipman
- Dale Owen - a notable Welsh modernist architect
