= Adam Hardy (architectural historian) =

British architect and historian

Charles Adam Hardy
- Born: October 16, 1953; High Wycombe, Buckinghamshire
- Citizenship: United Kingdom
- Known for: Temple architecture of South Asia

Academic background
- Doctoral advisor: George Michell

Academic work
- Institutions: Welsh School of Architecture

Professor Adam Hardy is an architect and architectural historian, and Professor of Asian Architecture at the Welsh School of Architecture, Cardiff University. He is Director of PRASADA, a centre bringing together research and practice in South Asian art and architecture.

His research is largely in the history of architecture in South Asia, particularly Hindu temple architecture, as well as that of Indian Buddhist and Jain temples. Going against a prevailing tendency to focus narrowly, his work has embraced most of the subcontinent, and a very long time span, while at the same time involving detailed formal analysis. He has tried to bring to light a meaningful way of looking at what at first sight seem bewilderingly complex structures. The work has revealed striking structural homologies between architecture and other branches of culture, and shown how, within a number of regional traditions, forms evolve in a characteristic way, notwithstanding conspicuous artistic inventiveness. Drawings have played an important role in his research, not only for explanation but also as a means of analysis.

He was educated at the Royal Grammar School, High Wycombe (1965–71) and Trinity College, Cambridge.

== Roles ==
- Editor of South Asian Studies
- Director, PRASADA
- Principal Investigator, The Indian Temple: Production, Place, Patronage (AHRC project)
- Editorial Board member for Context, Abacus, Pakistan Heritage
- Advisory Editor to OUP Online Bibliographies, Hinduism module
- Council member, British Association for South Asian Studies
- Executive Committee member, European Association of South Asian Art and Archaeology
- Member of AHRC Peer Review Academy

== Books ==
- Theory and Practice of Temple Architecture in Medieval India: Bhoja's Samaranganasutradhara and The Bhojpur Line Drawings (New Delhi: Dev Publishers & Distributors and Indira Gandhi National Centre for the Arts, 2015)
- The Temple Architecture of India (Chichester: Wiley, 2007)
- The Temple in South Asia (ed.)(London: British Academy, 2007)
- Architectural History and the Studio, edited with Necdet Teymur (London: Question Press, 1997)
- Indian Temple Architecture: Form and Transformation: the Karṇāṭa Drāviḍa Tradition, 7th to 13th Centuries, 1995, Abhinav Publications, New Delhi, ISBN 8170173124, 9788170173120, google books
