= Architecture of Karnataka =

Architecture of Indian state

Dravidian architecture
Cave temples and surface structural temples. Blend of North Indian Nagara style and South Indian Dravidian style

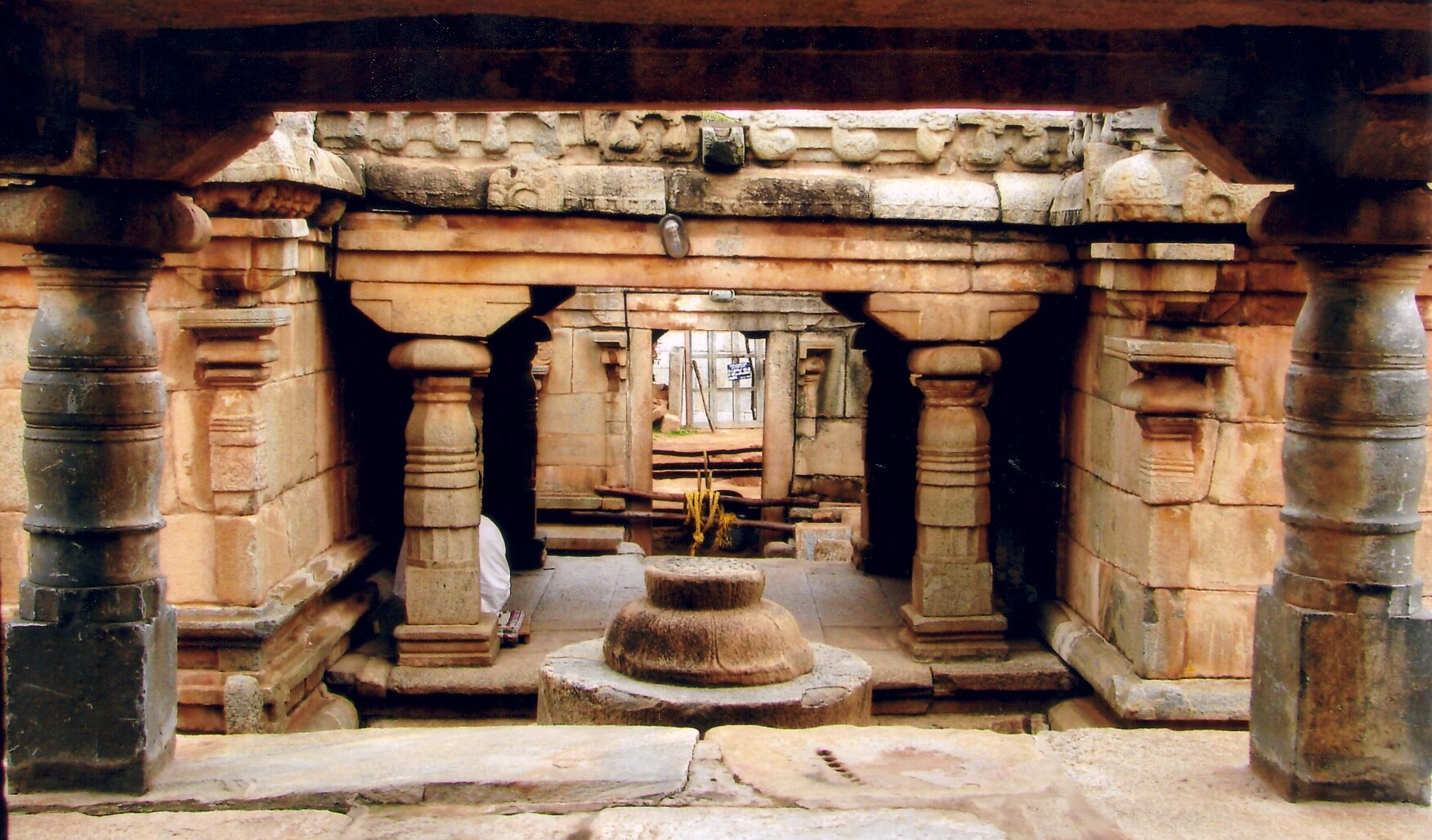
Mantapa, Panchakuta Basadi, Kambadahalli

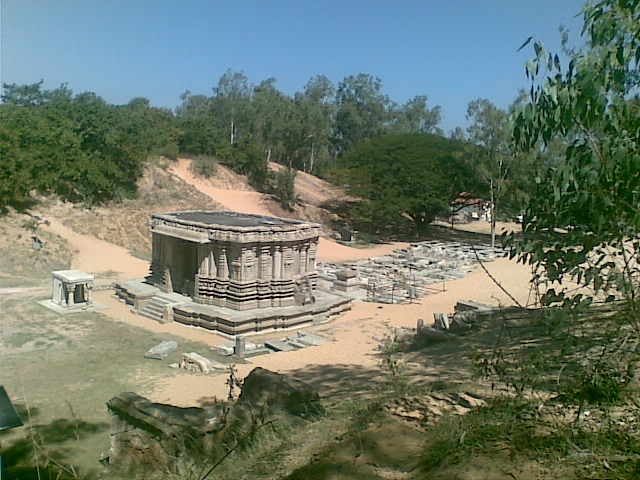
Temple recovered from sand dunes at Talakadu

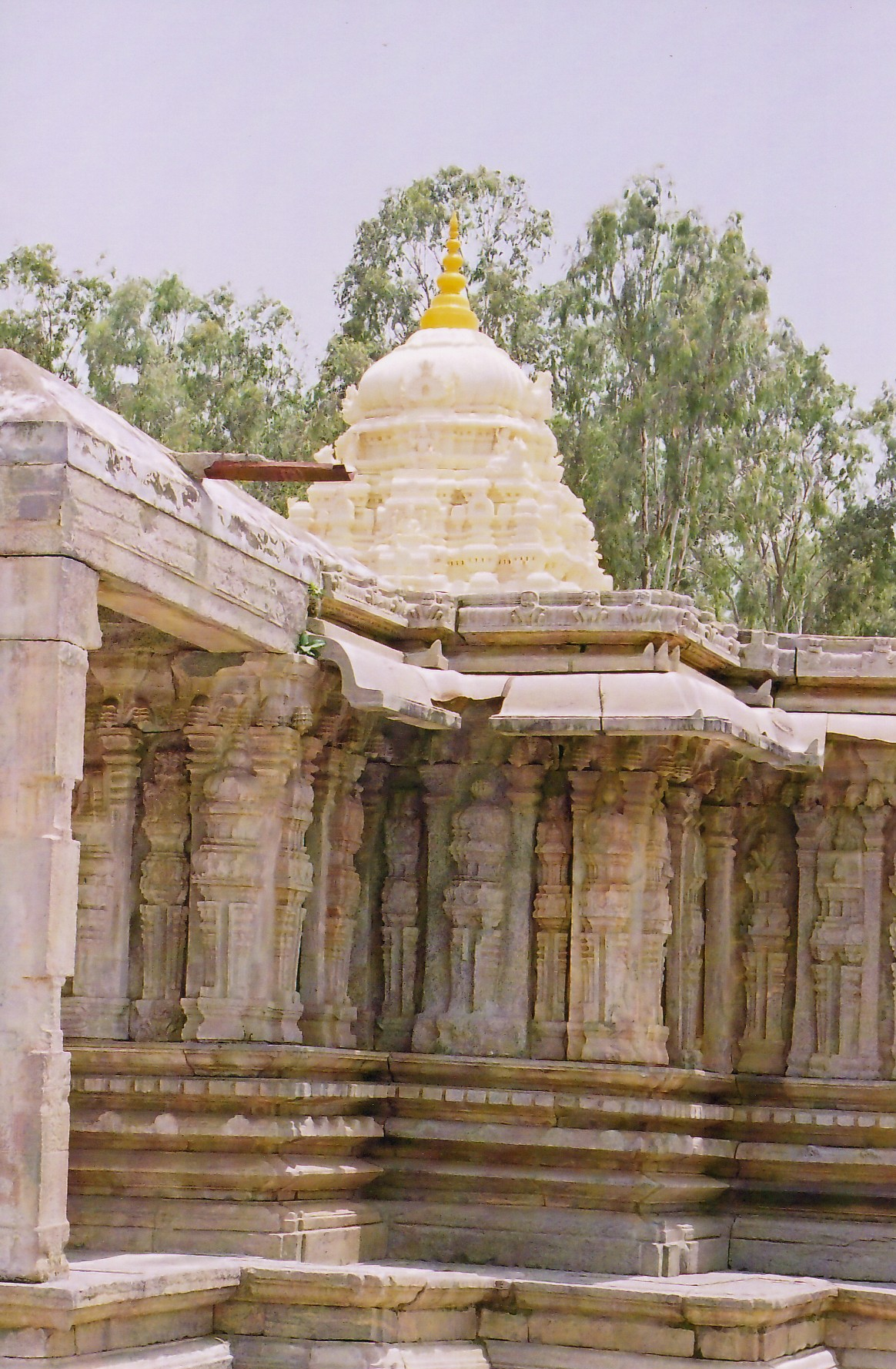
Keerthinarayana Temple at Talakad

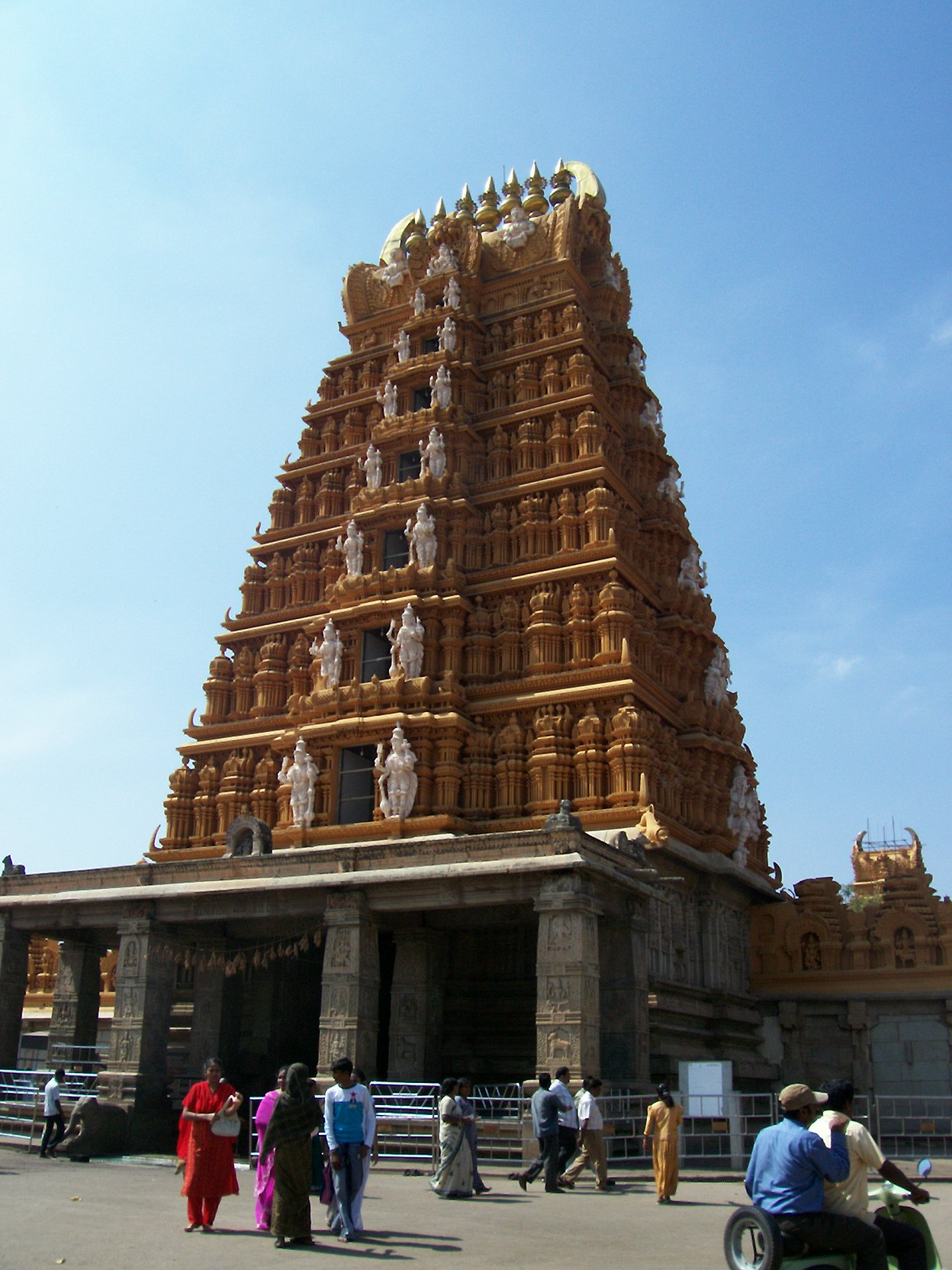
Nanjangud temple originally built by the Ganga Dynasty rulers in the ninth century

Karnataka is a southern Indian state most of which used to be known as the State of Mysore, and previously the Kingdom of Mysore. Over the centuries the architectural monuments of the region have displayed a variety of styles, often reflecting the region's position between the Tamil deep south and the Deccan region. There have been several ruling dynasties with their own distinct styles.

Its architecture ranges from Hindu and Jain places of worship, ruins of ancient cities, mausoleums and palaces. There are many Dravidian style Hindu temples. Two of the groups of monuments, Pattadakal and Hampi, are listed under the UNESCO World Heritage List of 22 cultural monuments in India. Styles of Indo-Saracenic, Renaissance, Corinthian, Hindu, Indo-Greek and Indo-British style palaces were built in Mysore, the city of palaces. Sikh architecture at Bidar (1512) and also in Bangalore in 1956 can also be cited as having an impact on the architectural composition of the state.

Apart from the ancient traditional Buddhist Viharas which existed in India since ancient times, since the Independence of India in 1947, Karnataka has experienced some marked architectural changes, notably by the influx of Tibetan refugees which arrived in the state between 1963 and 1997, bringing with them the traditional Tibetan art and architectural styles, reflected in the Buddhist monastery at Bylakuppe for instance. Vidhana Soudha (built in Bangalore in 1953) and the tallest temple at Murudeshwar are the witnesses to the Neo–Dravidian architectural influences which have evolved since independence.

== Origins ==
The antiquity of architecture of Karnataka (Kannada: ಕರ್ನಾಟಕ ವಾಸ್ತುಶಿಲ್ಪ) also known as Kannada architecture can be traced to its southern Neolithic and early Iron Age, Having witnessed the architectural ideological and utilitarian transformation from shelter- ritual- religion. Here the nomenclature 'Architecture' is as old as c.2000 BCE. The upper or late Neolithic people in order to make their shelters by their own they constructed huts made of wattle and doab, that were buttressed by stone boulders, presumably having conical roof resting on the bamboo or wooden posts into red murram or paved granite chips as revealed in archaeological excavations in sites like Brhamagiri (Chitradurga district), Sanganakallu, Tekkalakota (Bellary district), Piklihal (Raichur district). Megaliths are the dominant archaeological evidence of the early Iron Age (c. 1500 B.C.E – 100 C.E unsettled date). There are more than 2000 early Iron Age burial sites on record, who laid the foundation for a high non-perishable architecture in the form of various distinct architectural styles of stone-built burials, which are ritualistic in its character. The active religious architecture is evident 345 with that of the Kadamba Dynasty.

== Kadamba architecture ==
Synthesis of several schools of architecture during Kadamba Dynasty

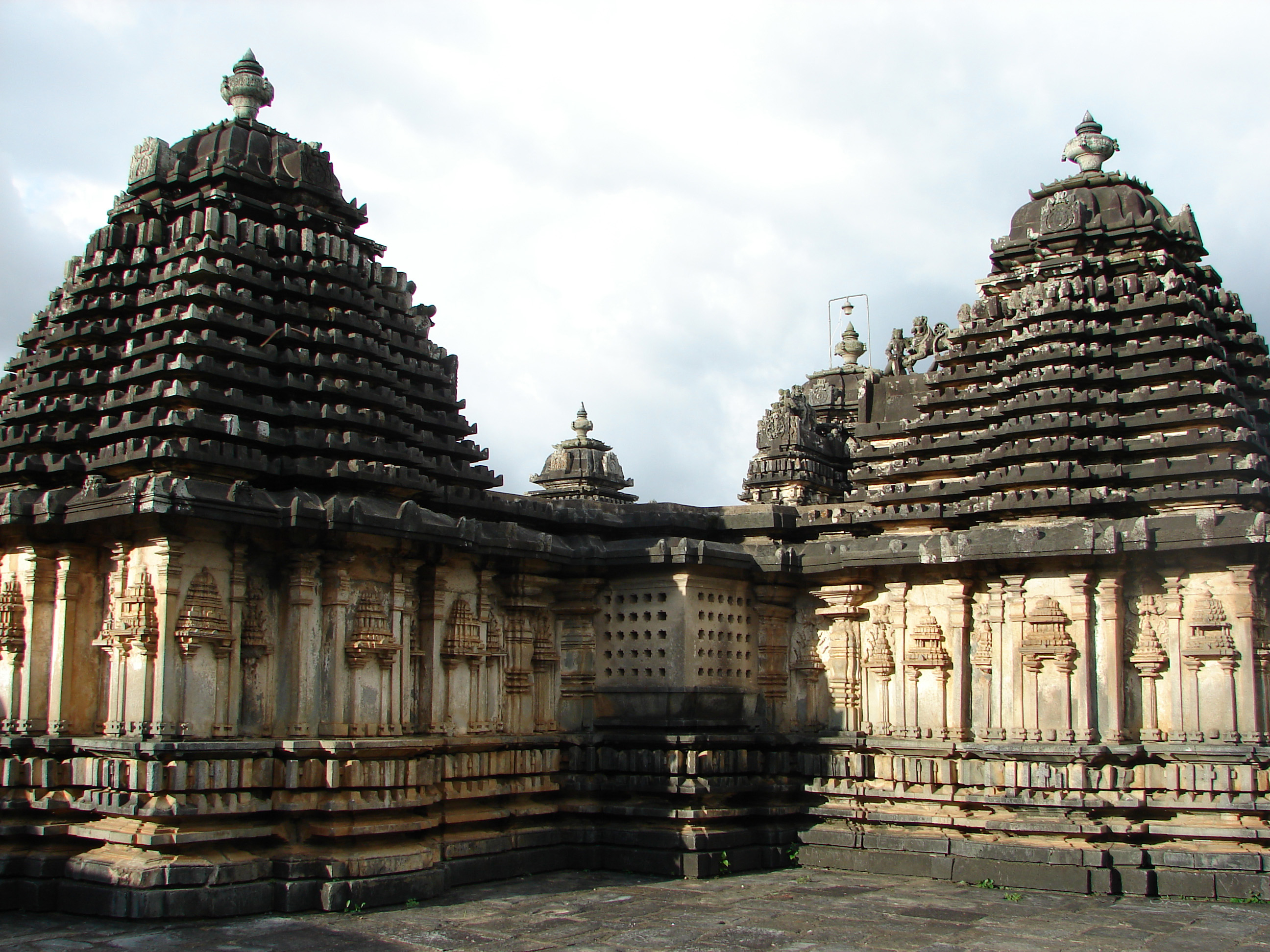
Kadamba shikhara (tower) with Kalasa (pinnacle) on top

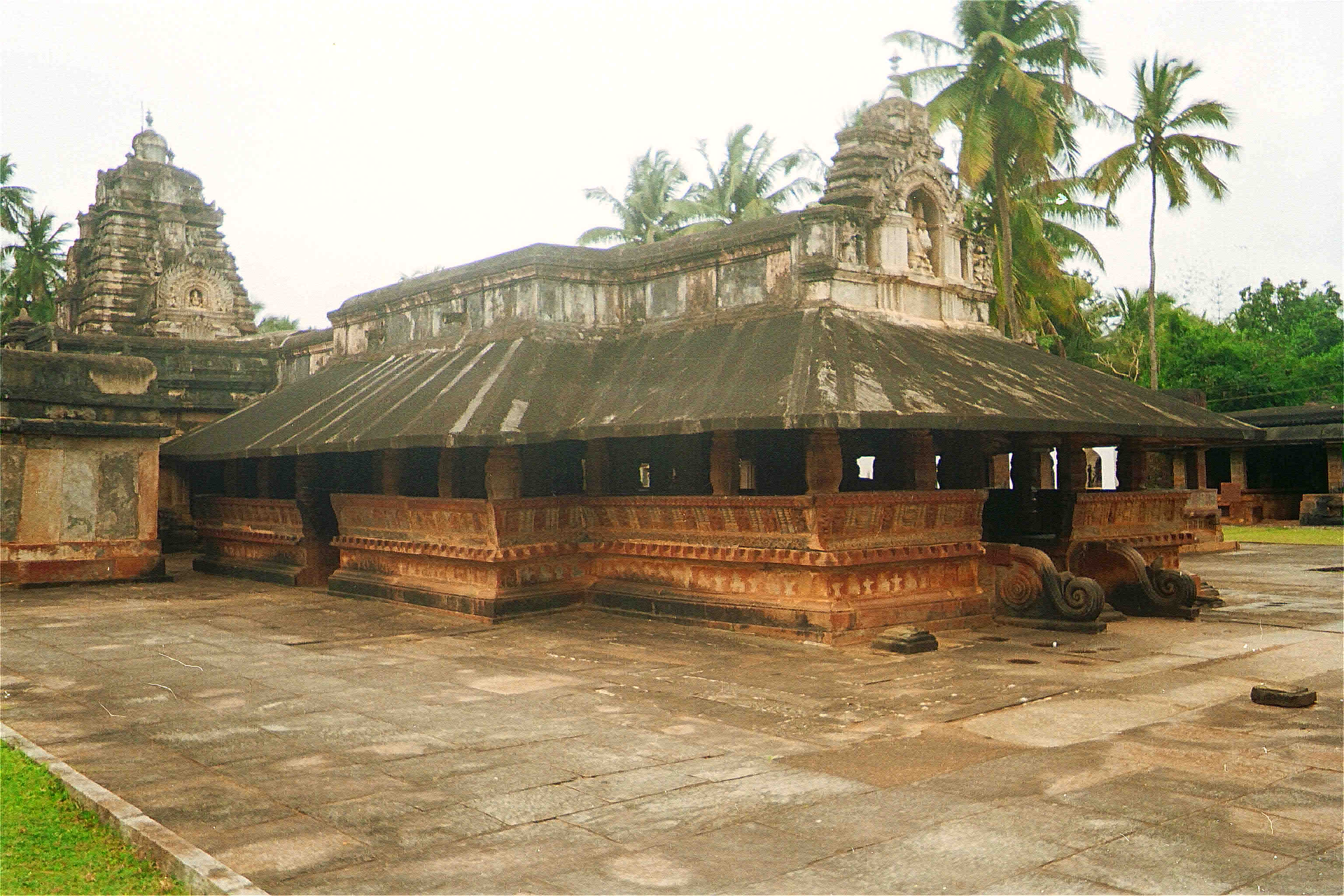
Madhukeshwara Temple

The most prominent basic feature of Kadamba Dynasty architecture is the Shikara (dome), called Kadambal Shikara. The Shikara is pyramid shaped and rises in steps without any decoration, with a stupika or kalasha at the top. Occasionally the pyramids had perforated screen windows. This style of Shikara was used several centuries later, having an influence on the Doddagaddavalli Hoysala Temple and the Mahakuta temples in Hampi. The Madhukeshwara (Shiva) Temple in Banavasi was built by Kadambas, and has an intricately carved stone cot. Originally built by the Kadambas, it has undergone, over a period of a thousand years, many additions and renovations, from the Chalukyas to the rulers of Sonda. "Kadambotsava", an annual cultural festival is held here in the month of December.

== Dravidian architecture ==
=== Panchakuta basadi (Jain basadi) ===
This is one of the most elegant monuments built in Dravidian, Vesara and Nagara styles during the period between 900 and 1000. The temple, which is oriented to the north towards the Brahmadeva pillar, has five shrines (hence the name Panchakuta). Three shrines are connected to a mantapa by a vestibule and consist of the main shrine of tirthankara Adinatha flanked by Neminatha shrine to the east and Shanthinatha shrine containing a 3 metres (9.8 ft) tall idol of the tirthankara to the west. The other two shrines, which are disconnected and lie to the north of the trikuta cluster (three shrines), are also dedicated to tirthankaras. These are two different monuments.

=== Talakad ===
Talakad is a historical site along the banks of the Cauvery River near Mysore. This small town, with a strong history and a prolonged period of human settlement was a flourishing city during the Hoysala period (12th–13th century), and was also an important trade centre during the reign of Gangas (from the 6th century for about 400 years) and Cholas (close of 10th century) and the Hoysalas from 1116. Towards the early 15th century it came under the Vijayanagara rule, and remained with them until the end of the 16th century. There are about a dozen temples spread over a small area of 4 square kilometres (1.5 mi^{2}), perhaps reflecting the rich art, culture, trade and human activities that once existed there. The town now looks abandoned, except during the time of pilgrimage held once every few years. The temples, whose deities are regularly worshipped, such as the Kirthinarayana Temple, are either uncovered frequently or are protected continuously from accumulation of sand. The sand is removed to uncover them for a specific worship and an important pilgrimage held every five to twelve years; the recent Panchalinga Darshana pilgrimage was held during December 2006.

=== Nanjangud Temple ===
The temple, located at Nanjangud on the right bank of the Kabini River, was originally built in Dravidian style by the Ganga Dynasty rulers in the 9th century during their occupation of this region. It has undergone extensions during the reign of Cholas, Hoysalas, and Wodeyars from the 9th to 19th centuries. It is one of the biggest temples in Karnataka with an area of 560 square feet (52 m^{2}) and with a Gopura (tower) of 36.576 metres (120.00 ft) height, which has seven stories with seven gold plated Kalasas on top of the Gopura.

The uniqueness of the temple is that it has 66 idols of Shaiva saints called as Nayanmars and more than 100 Lingas (of different kinds and sizes) including the main deity of Shrikanteshwara (Nanjundeshwara) Linga. Next to the Devi deity, in a separate chamber stands the emarald/jade Linga (Pachche Linga in kannada) popularly referred to as Hakim Nanjundeswara; a title given by Tippu Sultan. It is inscribed in the temple history that on the priests' special prayers to the deity, eyesight of the royal elephant was restored, where after the Sultan had a linga made of jade along with an emerald necklace and donated it to the temple.

== Badami Chalukya architecture ==
Badami Chalukya Architecture, Badami cave temples

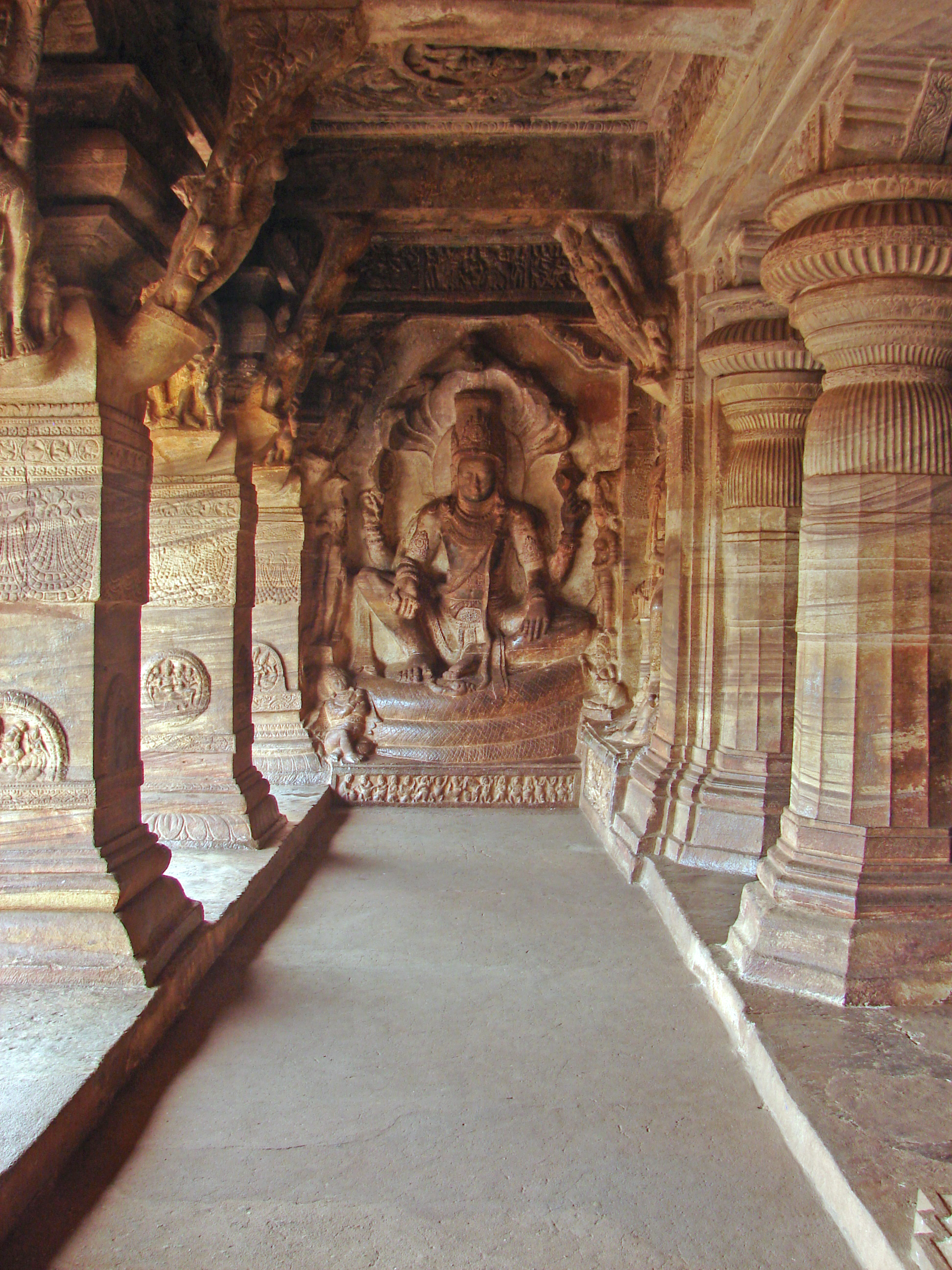
Vishnu seated an Adisesha (serpent) in the Badami cave temple

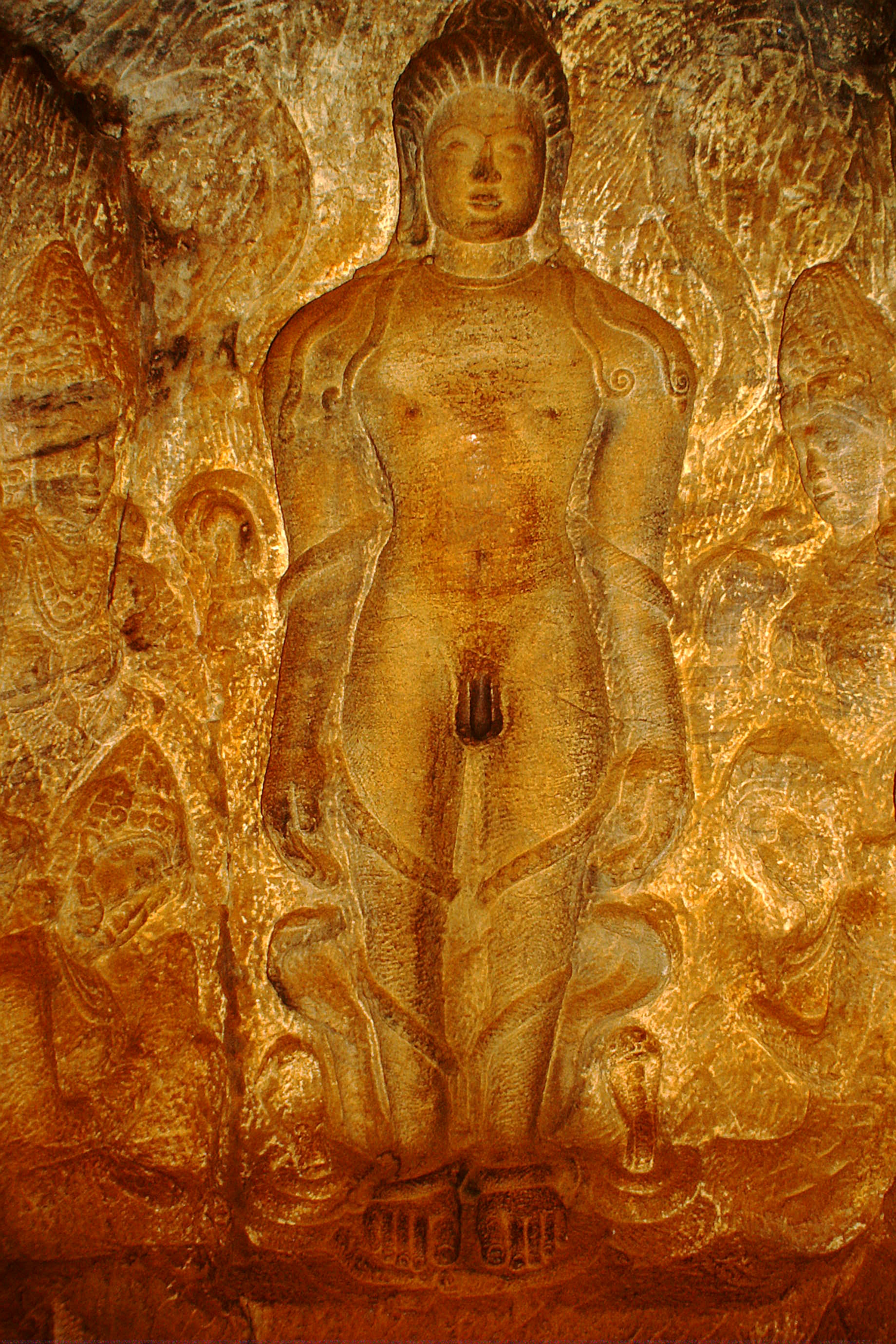
Bahubali in Badami cave number 4

The architecture is of a temple building idiom that evolved in the time period of 5th to 8th centuries in the area of Malaprabha basin, in present-day Bagalkot district of Karnataka state, sometimes called the Vesara style and Chalukya style. The earliest temples dating back to around 450 in Aihole when the Badami Chalukyas were feudatories of the Kadambas of Banavasi are also reflected during this period. According to historians, the Badami Chalukya contribution to temple building matched their valour and their achievements in battle. Their style included two types of monuments, namely the rock cut halls (caves) or cave temple features and the surface structural monuments.

Badami Chalukya Architecture, Aihole cave temple

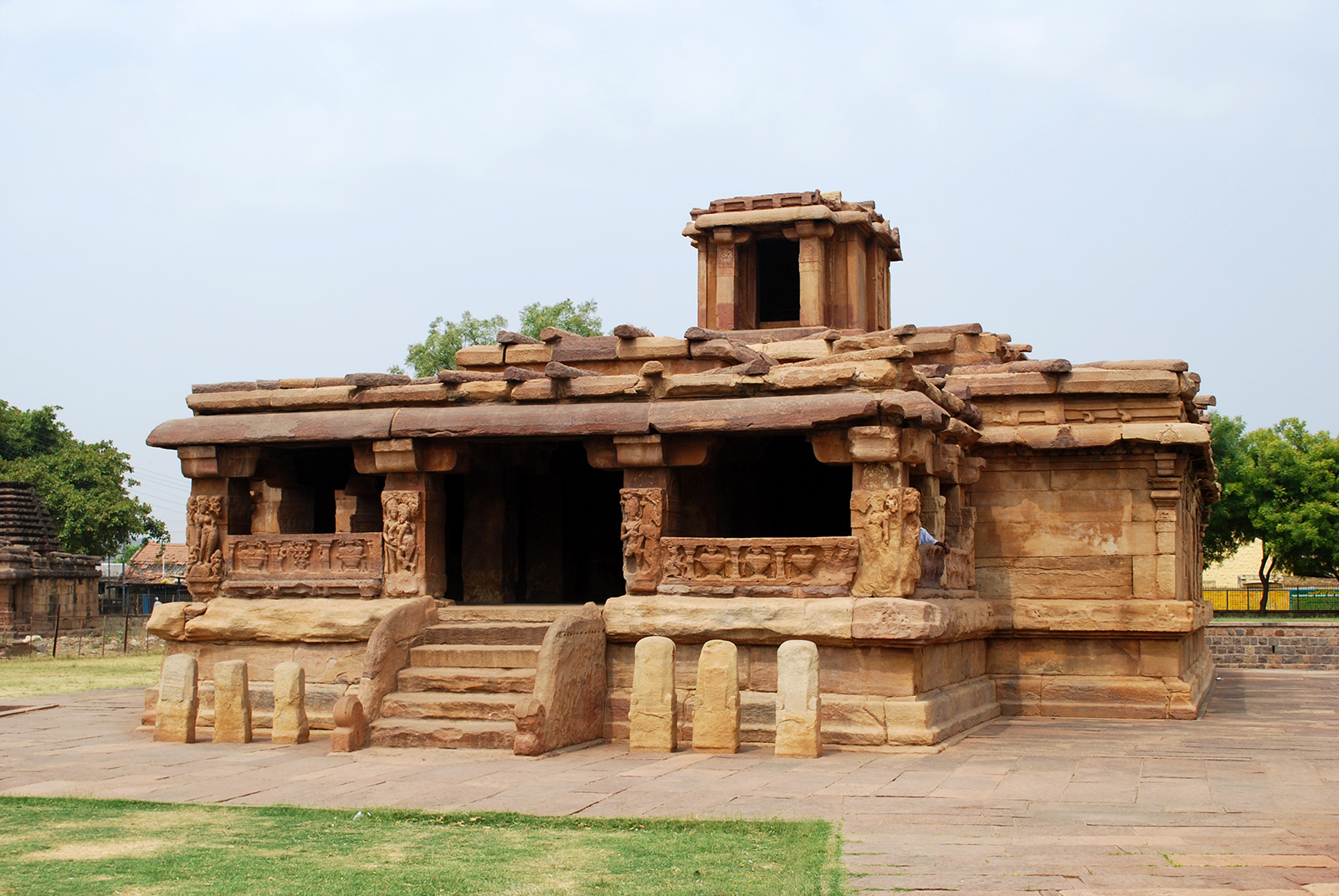
Lad Khan Temple at Aihole North Karnataka

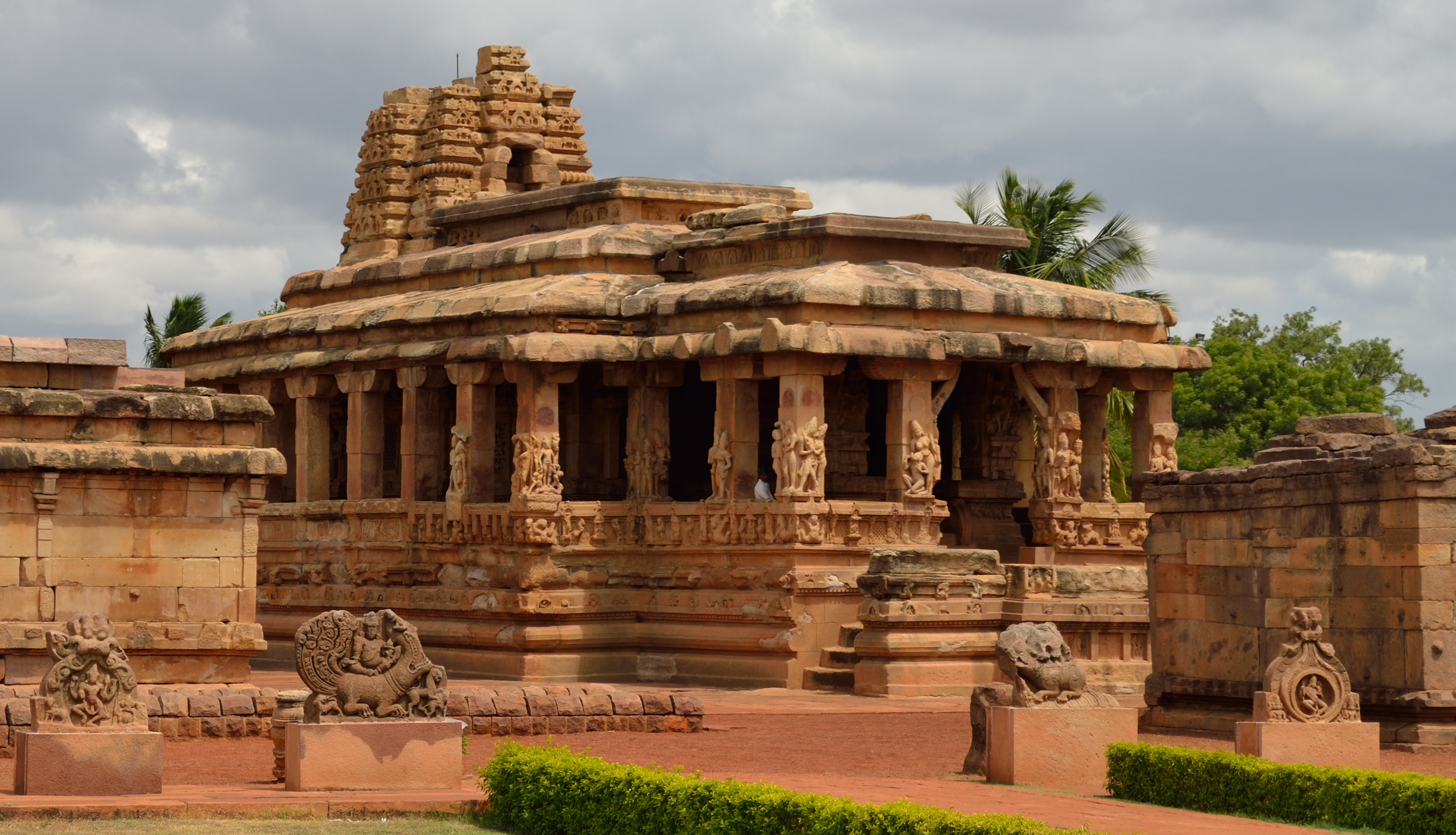
Durga temple at Aihole North Karnataka

=== Cave temples ===
Cave temple architecture is found in the Badami cave temples at Badami, the early Chalukya capital, carved out in the 6th century. There are four cave temples hewn from the sides of cliffs, three Hindu and one Jain, which contain carved architectural elements such as decorative pillars and brackets as well as finely carved sculpture and richly etched ceiling panels. Nearby are many small Buddhist cave shrines. The four caves are simple in style. The entrance is a simple verandah with stone columns and brackets -a distinctive feature of these caves-leading to a columned mandapa and then to the small square shrine (sanctum sanctorum) cut deep into the cave. The temple caves represent different religious sects. Among them, two are dedicated to Vishnu, one to Lord Shiva and the fourth is a Jain temple. The first three are devoted the Vedic faith and the fourth cave is the only Jain temple at Badami.

== Dravidian and Rekhanagara style of architecture of Rashtrakutas ==
The Rashtrakutas who ruled the Deccan from Manyakheta, Kalaburagi district, Karnataka in the period 753–973 created the Dravidian style and Rekhanagara style of architectural monuments. One of the richest traditions in Indian architecture took shape in the Deccan during this time and one writer calls it Karnataka Dravida style as opposed to traditional Dravida style. Pattadakal UNESCO World Heritage Site and the Navalinga temples are the structural types of the Rashtrakutas.

=== Pattadakal ===
Pattadakal, UNESCO Heritage Monument: group of 10 temples of Dravidian, Nagara and mixed styles of architecture

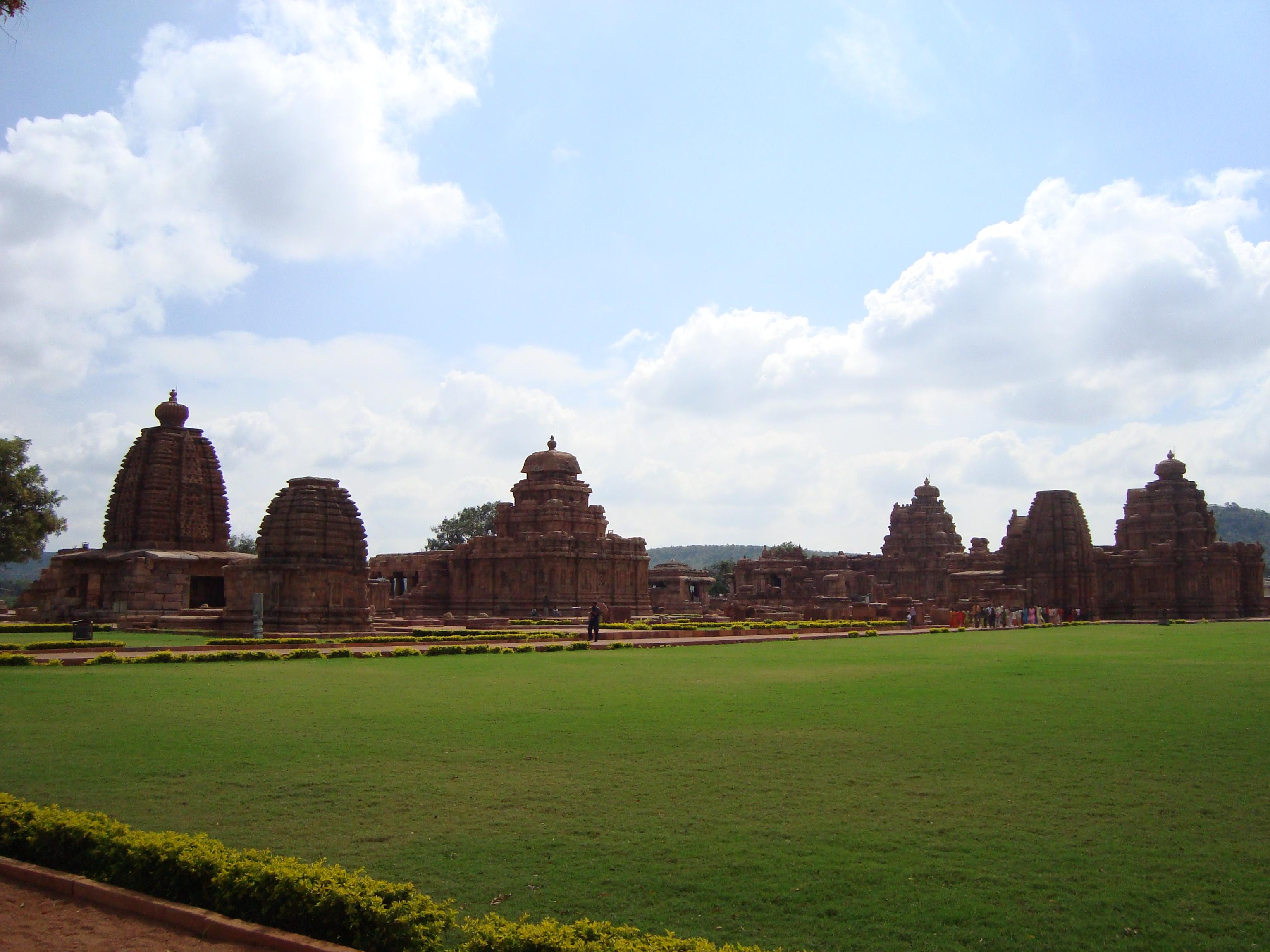
Group of 10 temples at Pattadakal

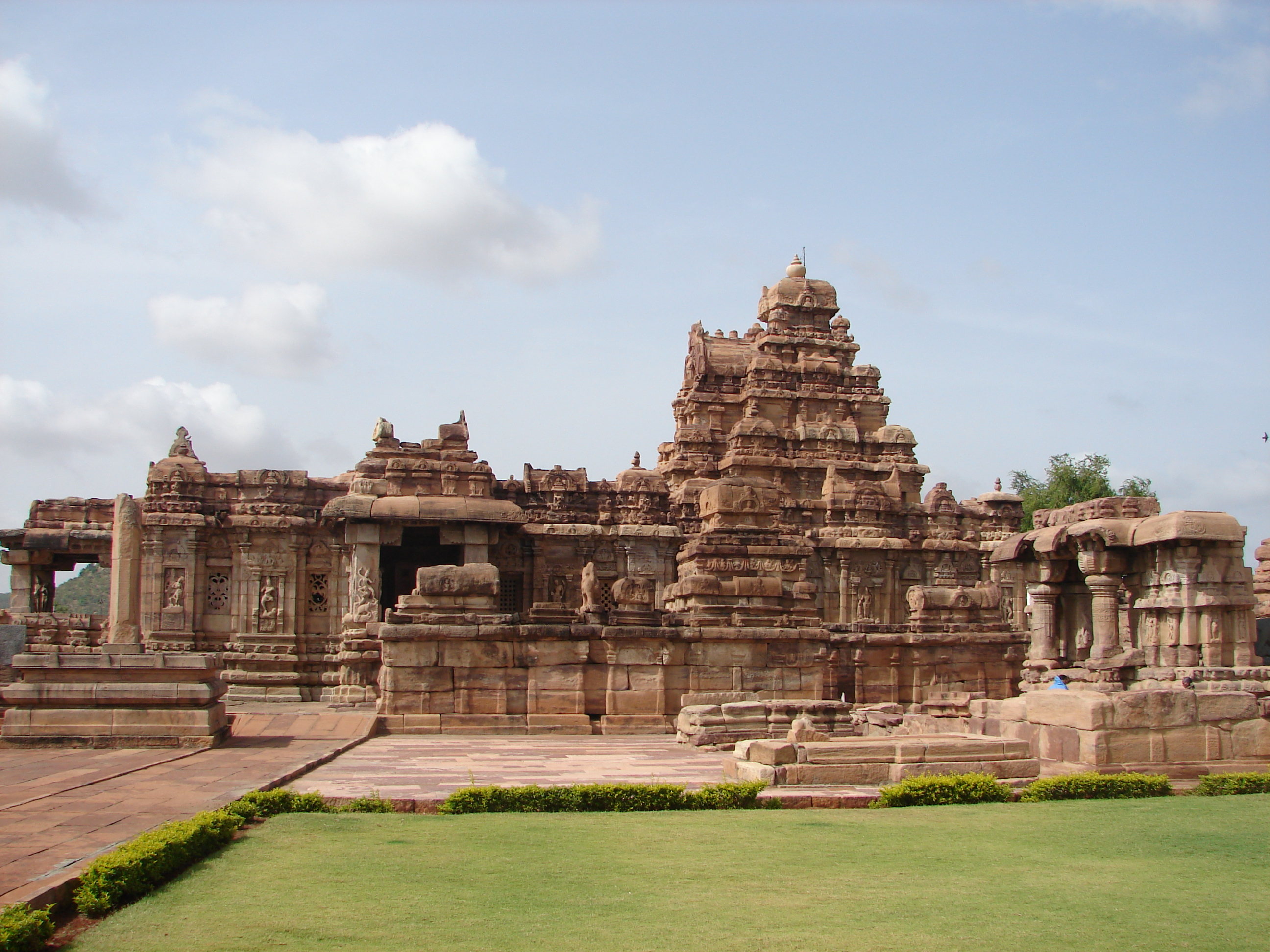
Virupaksha temple in Dravidian style

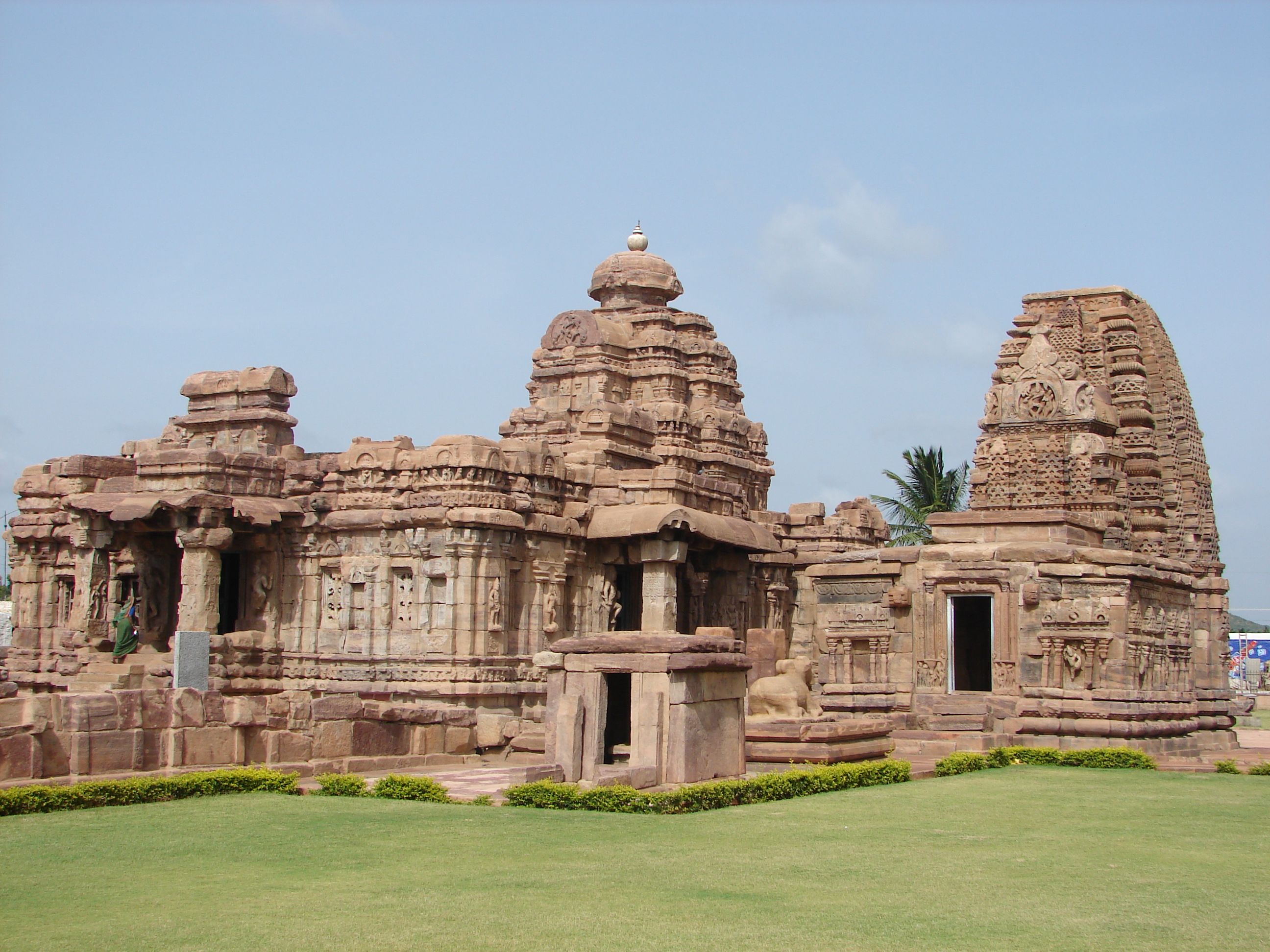
Mallikarjuna and Kasivisvanatha temples in Dravida and Nagara styles

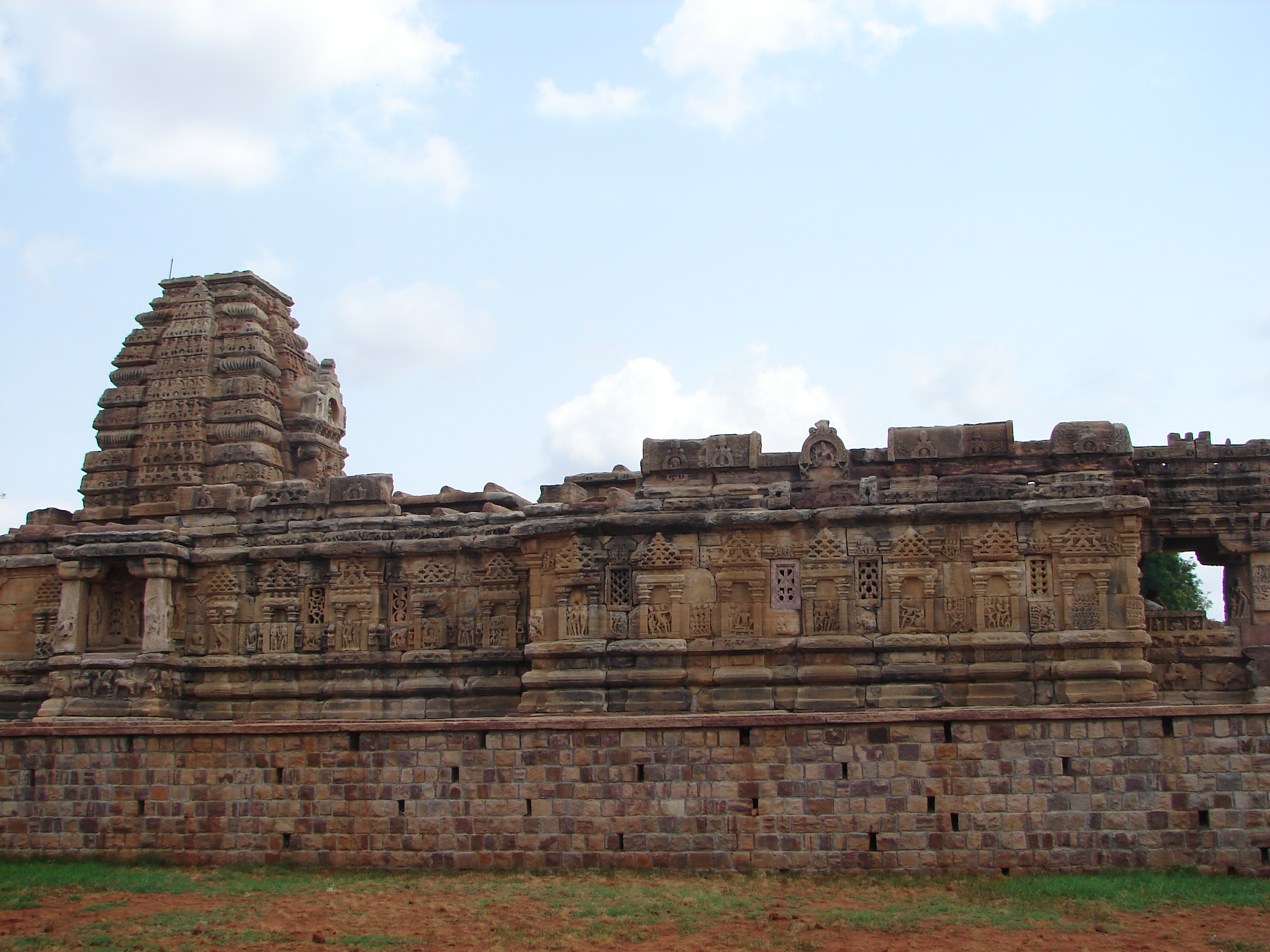
Papanatha temple – fusion of southern and northern Vesara styles

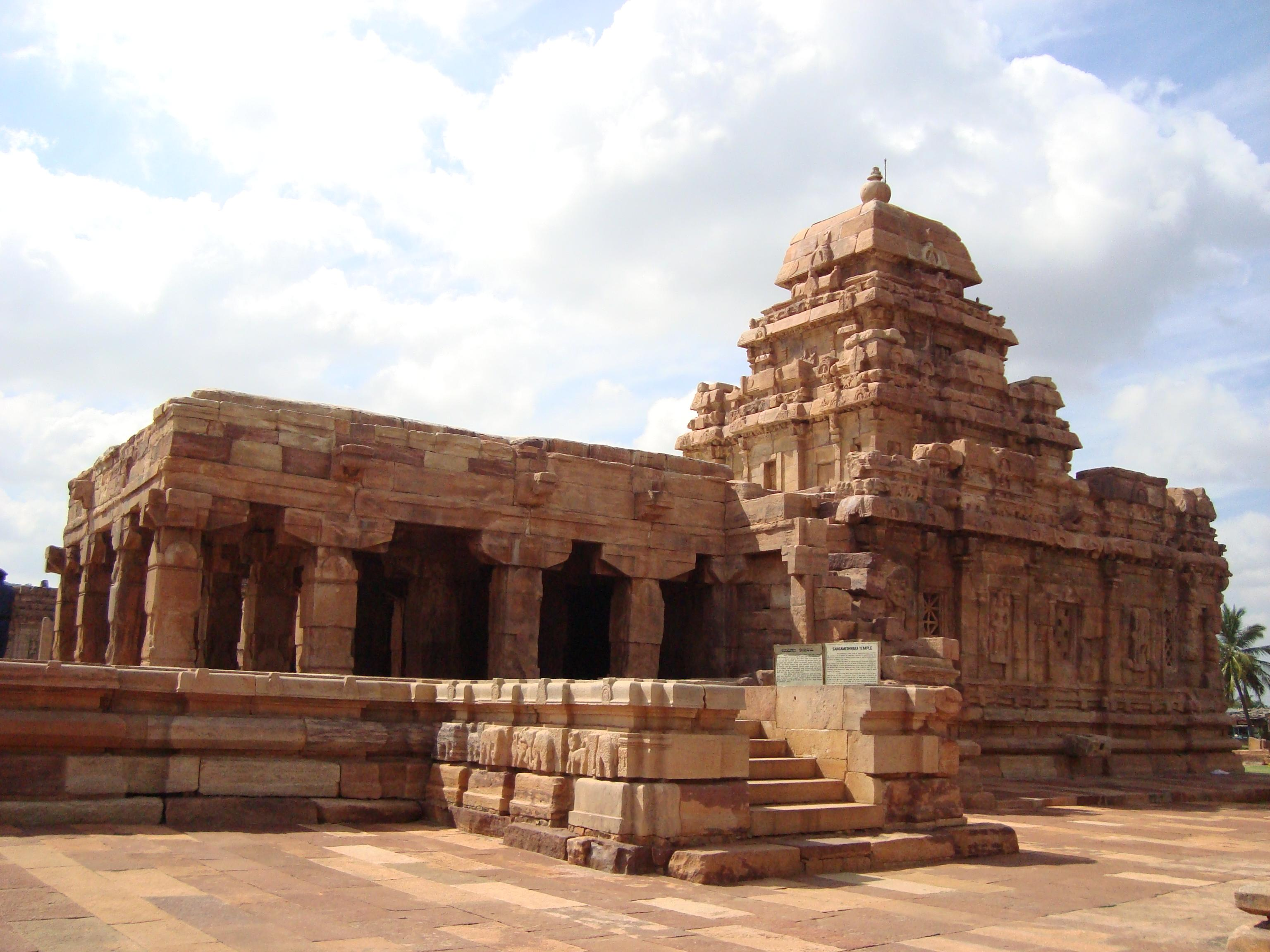
Sangameshvara temple in Dravidian style

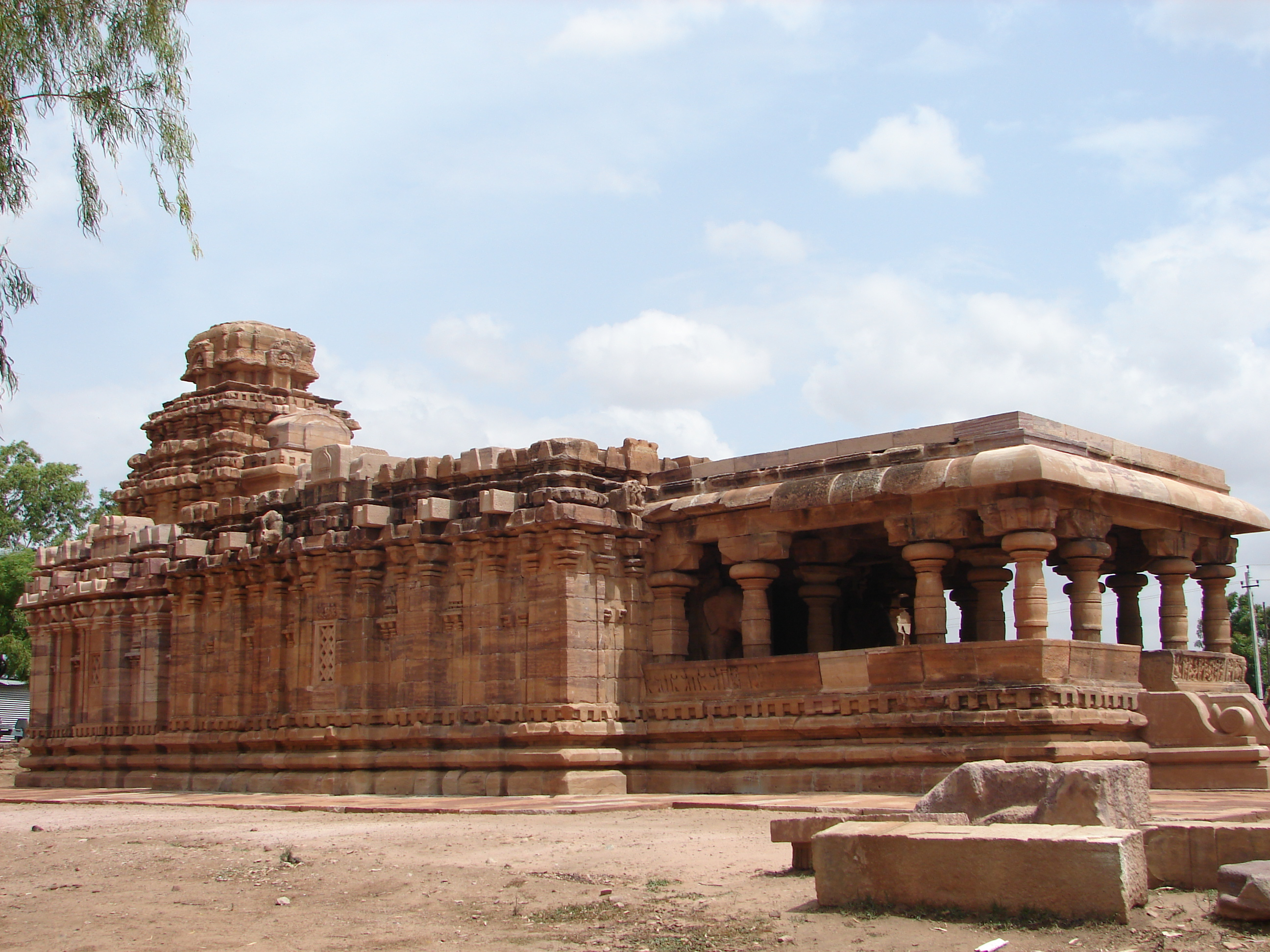
Jain Narayana temple in Dravidian style

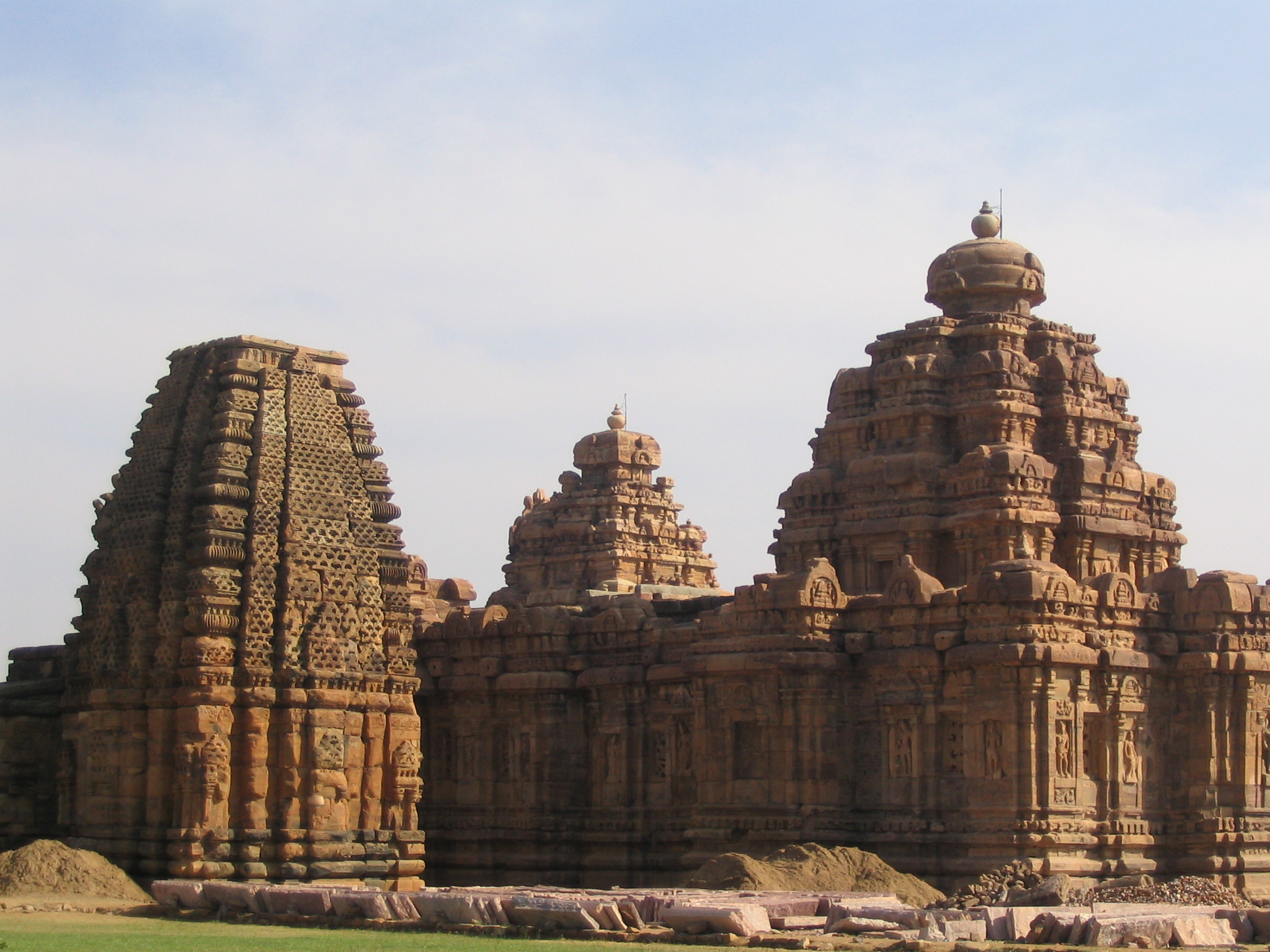
Temples in fusion of Dravidian and Nagara styles

A group of monuments at Pattadakal, a UNESCO World Heritage Site, is located in the Bagalkot district of Karnataka. The temples of this group are the finest structural temples of this period and these are the Jaina, Dolmen, Kadasiddheswara, Jambulingeswara, Galaganatha, Chandrashekhara, Sangameswara, Kasivisweswara, Mallikarjuna, Virupaksha and Papanatha Temples. The uniqueness of this place derives from the presence of both the Dravidian or the Southern and the Nagara or the Northern (Indo-Aryan) styles of temple architecture. Of the ten temples in Pattadakal, six are in Dravidian style and four in Rekhanagara style. The most famous temples are the Virupaksha Temple, Jain Narayana Temple and the Kashivishvanatha Temple at Pattadakal.

The best known Virupaksha Temple, earliest of the temples in the Chalukyan series, was built by Queen Lokamahadevi in 745 to commemorate her husband's victory (Vikramaditya II 733–746) over the Pallavas of Kanchi. The temple closely resembles the Kailashnatha temple in Kanchi which served as a model for this temple. The Virupakhsa Temple, in turn, served as an inspiration for the Kailashnatha Temple built by the Rashtrakuta dynasty in Ellora.

The Virupaksha Temple is rich in sculptures like those of Lingodbhava, Nataraja, Ravananugraha and Ugranarasimha. It is stated by the Archaeological Survey of India that the tall vimana with axial mandapas and peripheral sub-shrines round the court, enclosed by a wall with gopura-entrances in front and behind were all designed and completed at one time. Adoptions from the Shore Temple at Mahabalipuram in the form of kuta and said–heads has an impressive view from a distance.

=== Sangameshvara Temple ===
Sangameshvara Temple built by King Vijayaditya Satyashraya is incomplete, yet attractive. It is the oldest temple built by Vijayaditya Satyashraya (697–733) exhibits in its vimana a large degree of the contemporary Pallava temples in the southerly elements, as in the Virupaksha and Mallikarjuna temples. The temple is square on plan from the base to shikhara similar to Virupaksha Temple, has no sukanasika but the vimana has three storeys. The lowermost storey is surrounded by two walls, the inner and outer, the second storey being an upward projection of the inner wall, while the outer wall encloses the covered circumambulatory round the sanctum.

=== Galaganatha Temple ===
Galaganatha Temple, facing east, built around 750, in the finely evolved rekha-nagara prasada style of architecture contains a sculpture of Shiva killing the demon Andhakasura. The temple, built on a plinth with three highly ornate mouldings, comprises a garbhagriha or sanctum which a linga and a vestibule (antarala), both surrounded by a closed circumambulatory path (pradakshinapatha), a hall (sabha–mandapa) and an entrance porch (mukhamandapa). The most striking feature of the temple is its well-preserved northern superstructure (rekha-nagara shikhara), topped by amalaka and kalasha. The sculpture housed in this pavilion is that of Siva slaying Andhakasura. The eight-armed god wears a wreath of human skulls (munda-mala) like a sacred thread (yajnopavita) and is depicted as piercing the demon with the trident (trisula).

=== Papanatha Temple ===
The Papanatha Temple, built around 740, as per Archaeological Survey of India (ASI) records, is in the Vesara style. The temple was started in Nagara style but later changed to a more balanced Dravidian style. Sculptures here depict scenes from Ramayana and Mahabharatha. The temple's plan has a sanctum (garbhagriha) surrounded by a circumambulatory path (pradakshinapatha) with devakoshtha pavilions in its three walls, an ardha-mandapa, a sabha-mandapa and an entrance porch (mukhamandapa) provided with kakshasana. A well-developed rekha-nagara (northern) shikhara with an elaborately carved Chaitya-arch enshrining Nataraja on the frontage of the sukanasa is a special feature at this temple. This temple has many similarities with the Navabrahma temples in Alampur, Andhra Pradesh, which were also built by the same dynasty.

Archaeological studies of all the Pattadakal temples show that some have the stellar (multigonal) plan later to be used profusely by the Hoysalas of Belur and Halebidu. Another fine monument at Pattadakal is the Navalinga temple at Kuknur.

=== Navalinga Temple ===
The Navalinga Temple was built in the 9th century, during the reign of King Amoghavarsha I or his son Krishna II of the Rashtrakuta Dynasty. The temple is located in the town of Kukkanur, 40 km away from Gadag. Built in the South Indian Dravidian architecture style, each of the nine temples in the cluster has a linga, the universal symbol of the Hindu god Shiva, and hence the name Navalinga (lit nine lingas).

== Western Chalukya architecture ==
Western Chalukya architecture

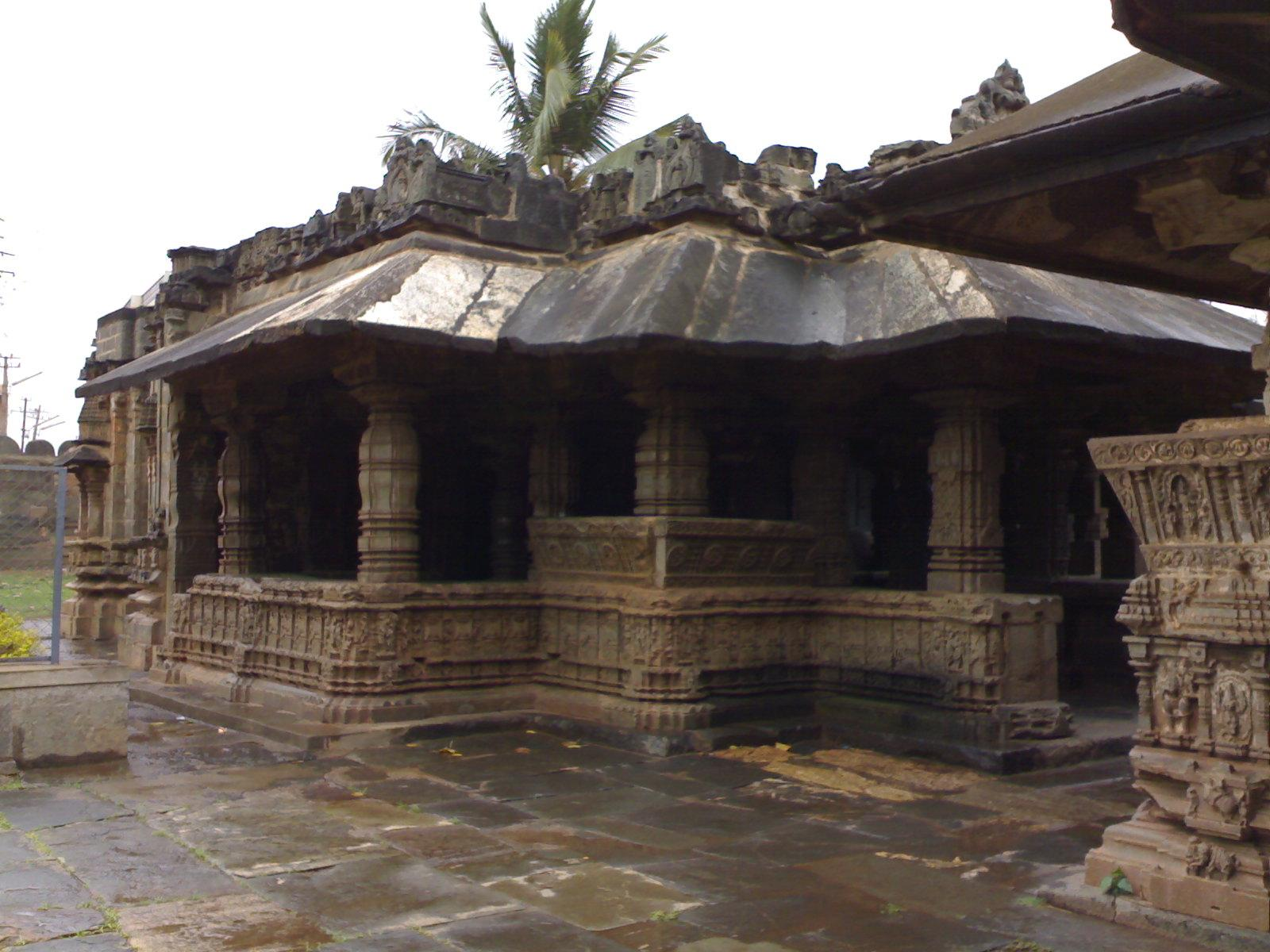
Trikuteshwara temple complex in Gadag

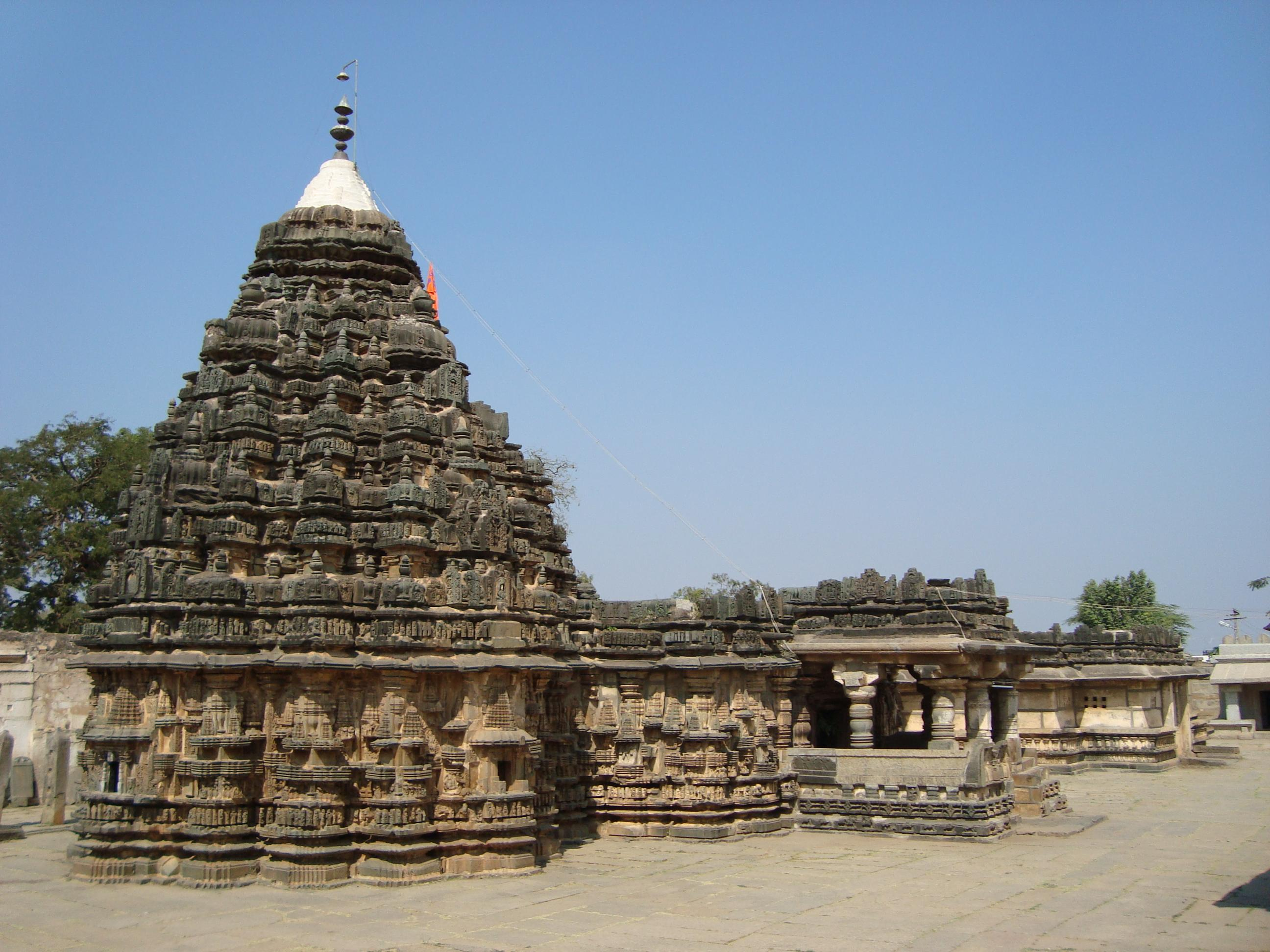
Someshwara temple at Lakshmeshwara

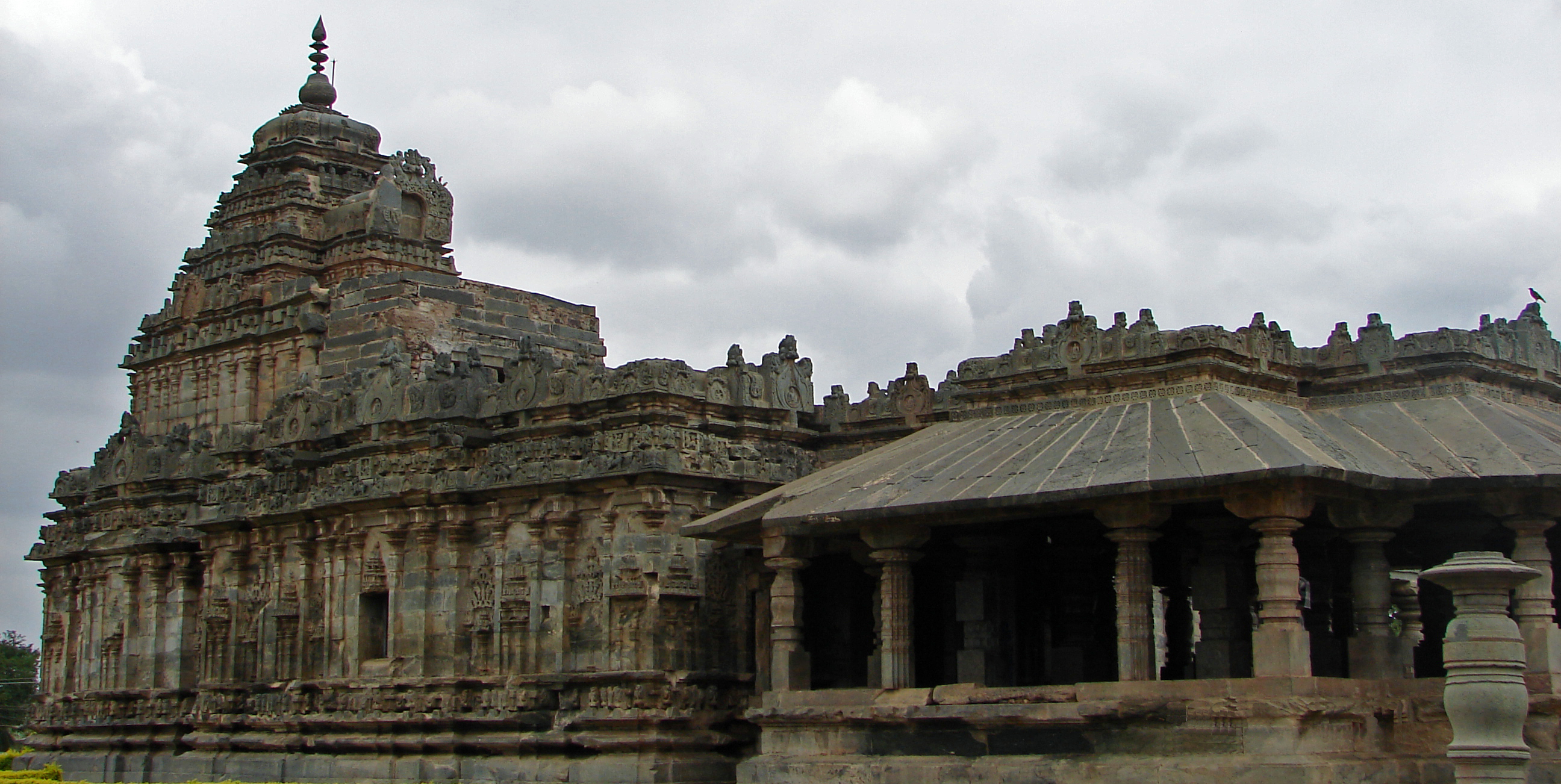
Brahma Jinalaya, Lakkundi

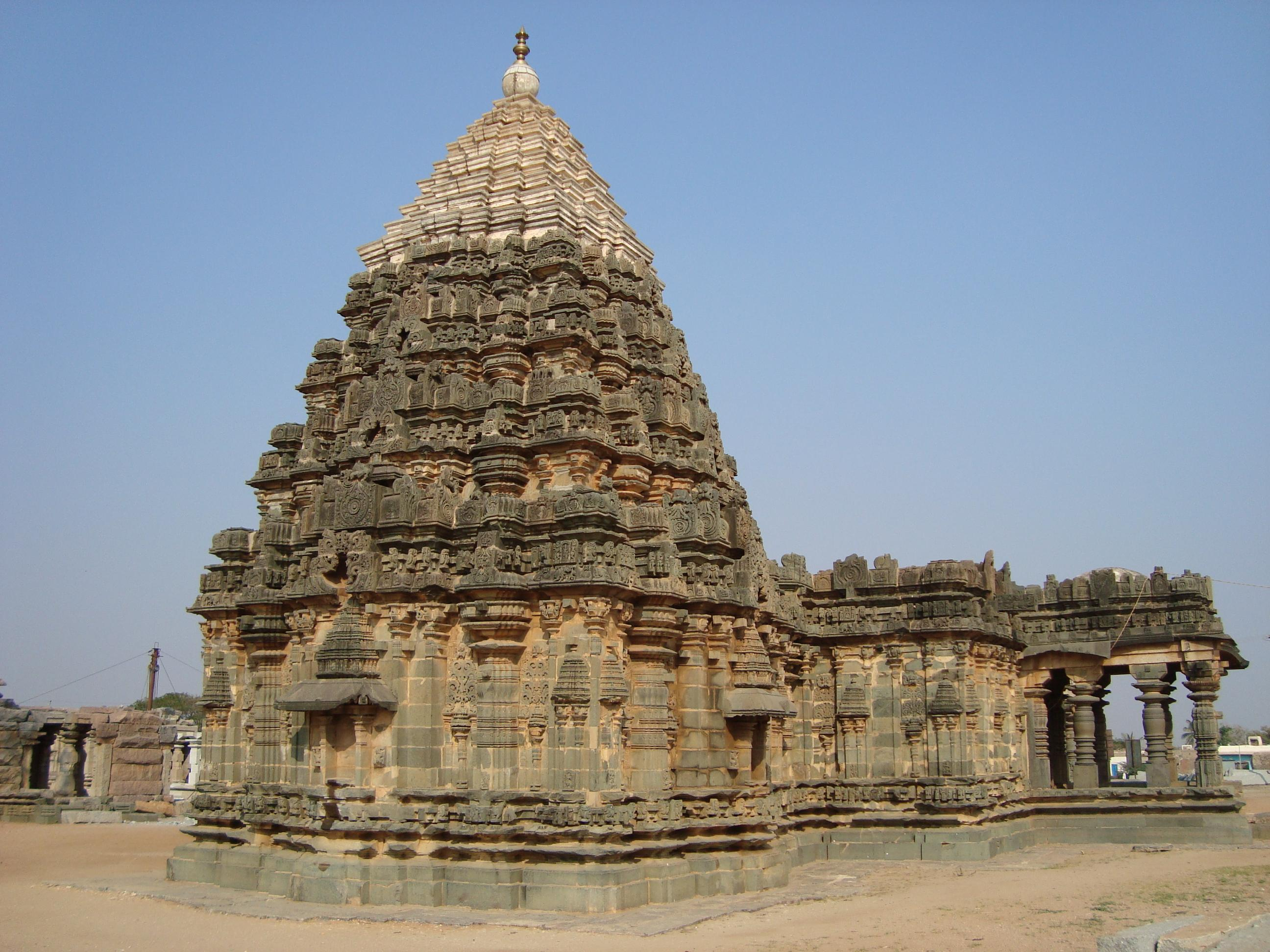
Mahadeva Temple at Itagi

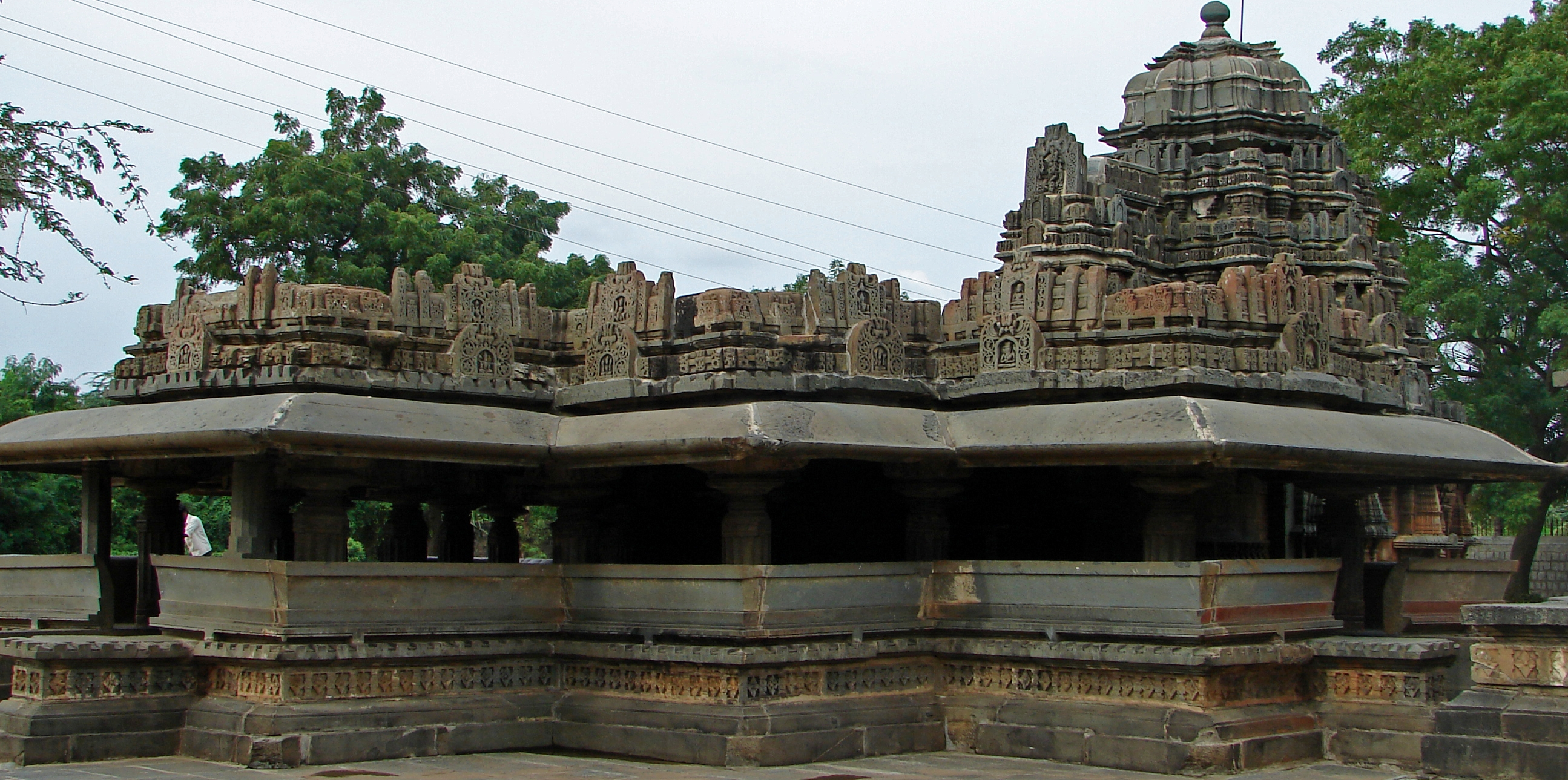
Siddhesvara Temple at Haveri

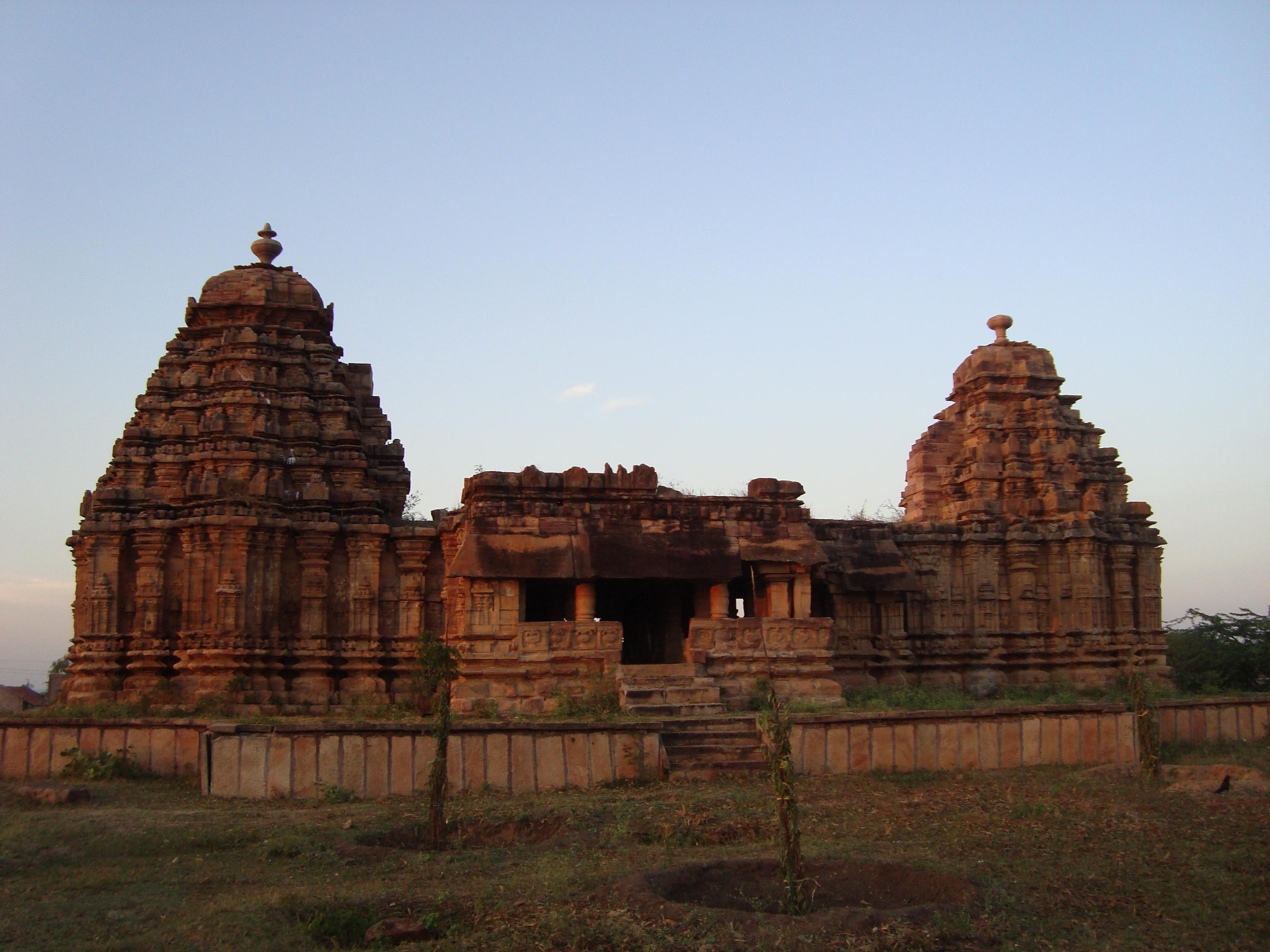
Twin Towered Temple at Sudi

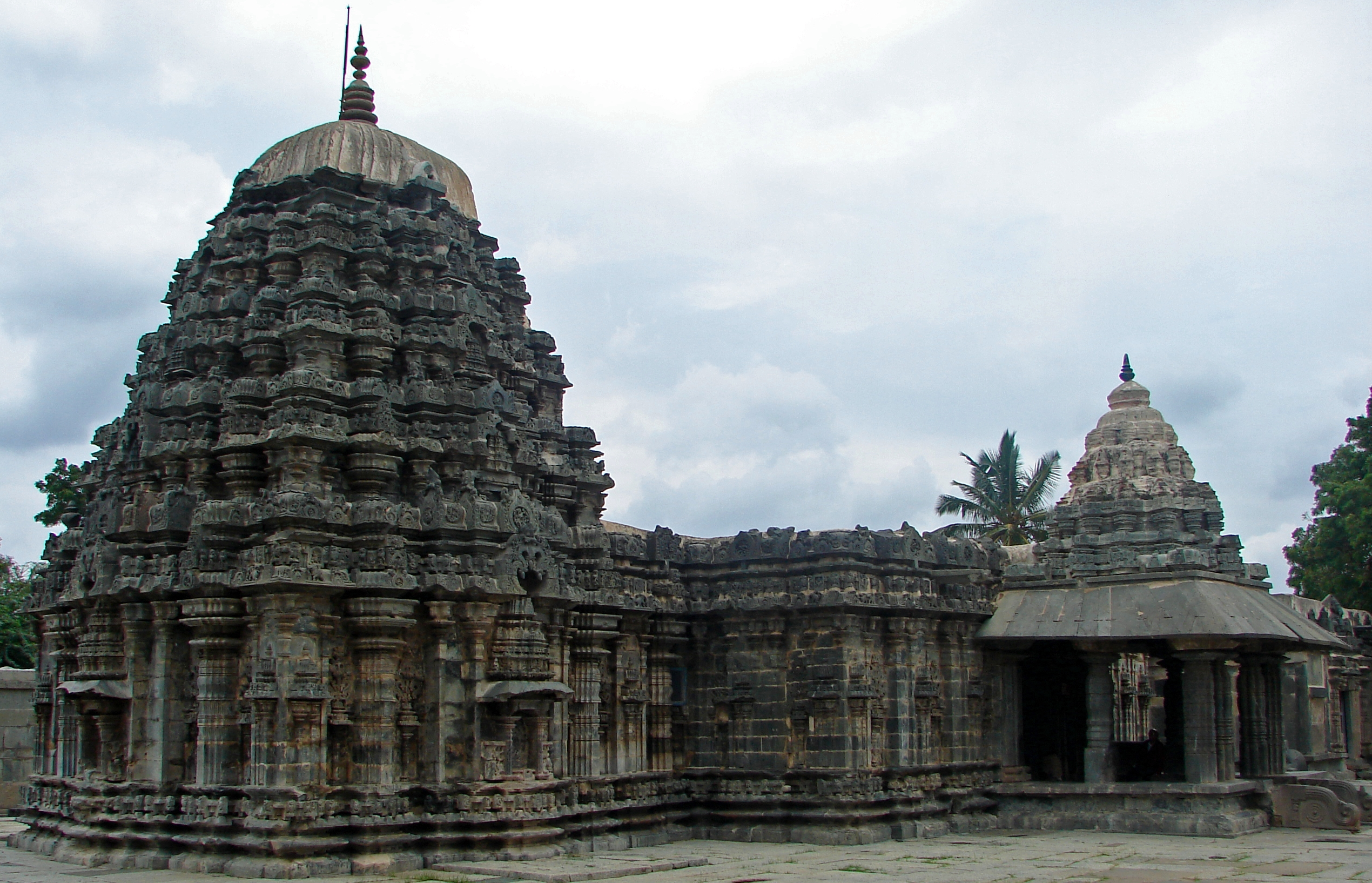
Amrtesvara Temple at Annigeri

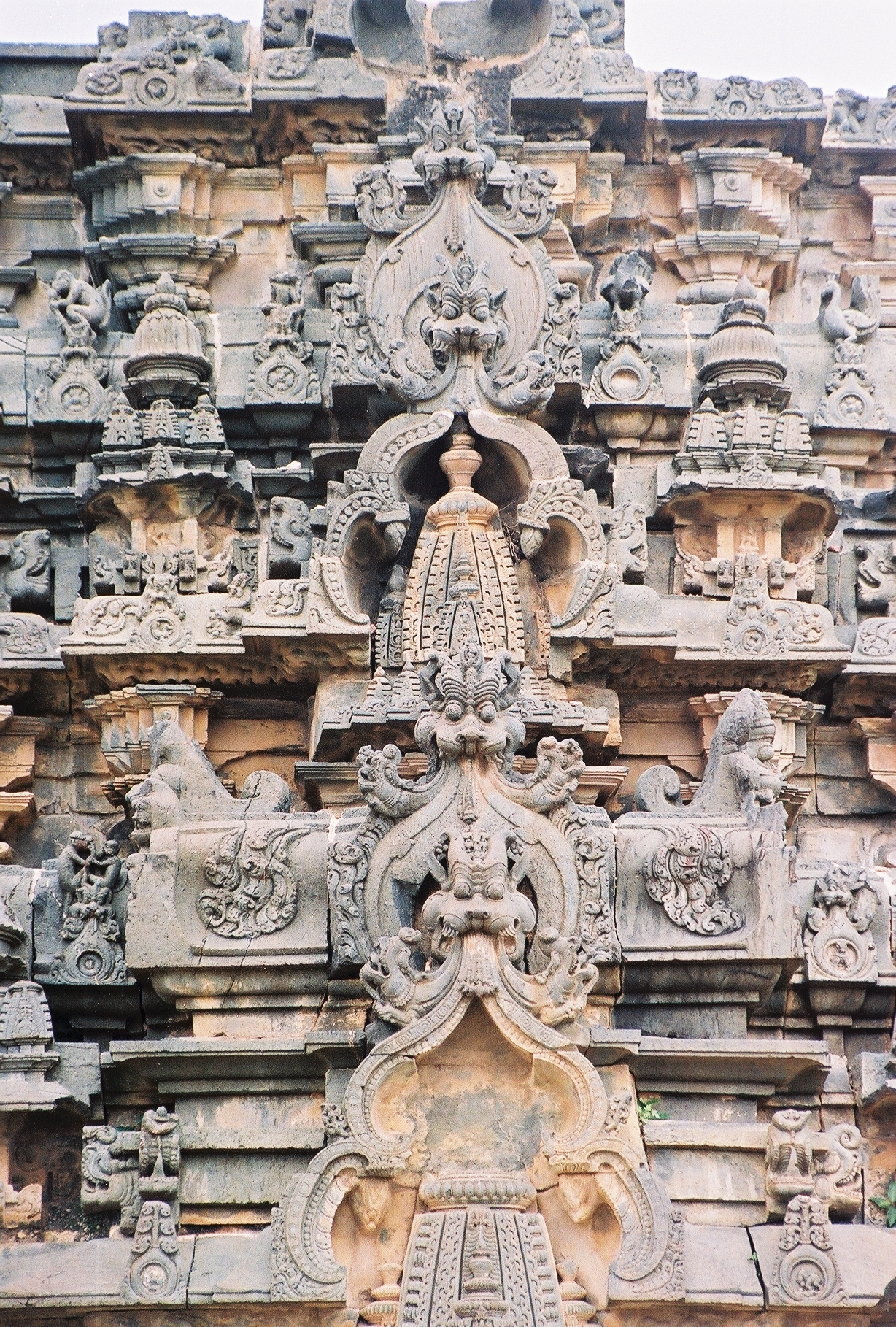
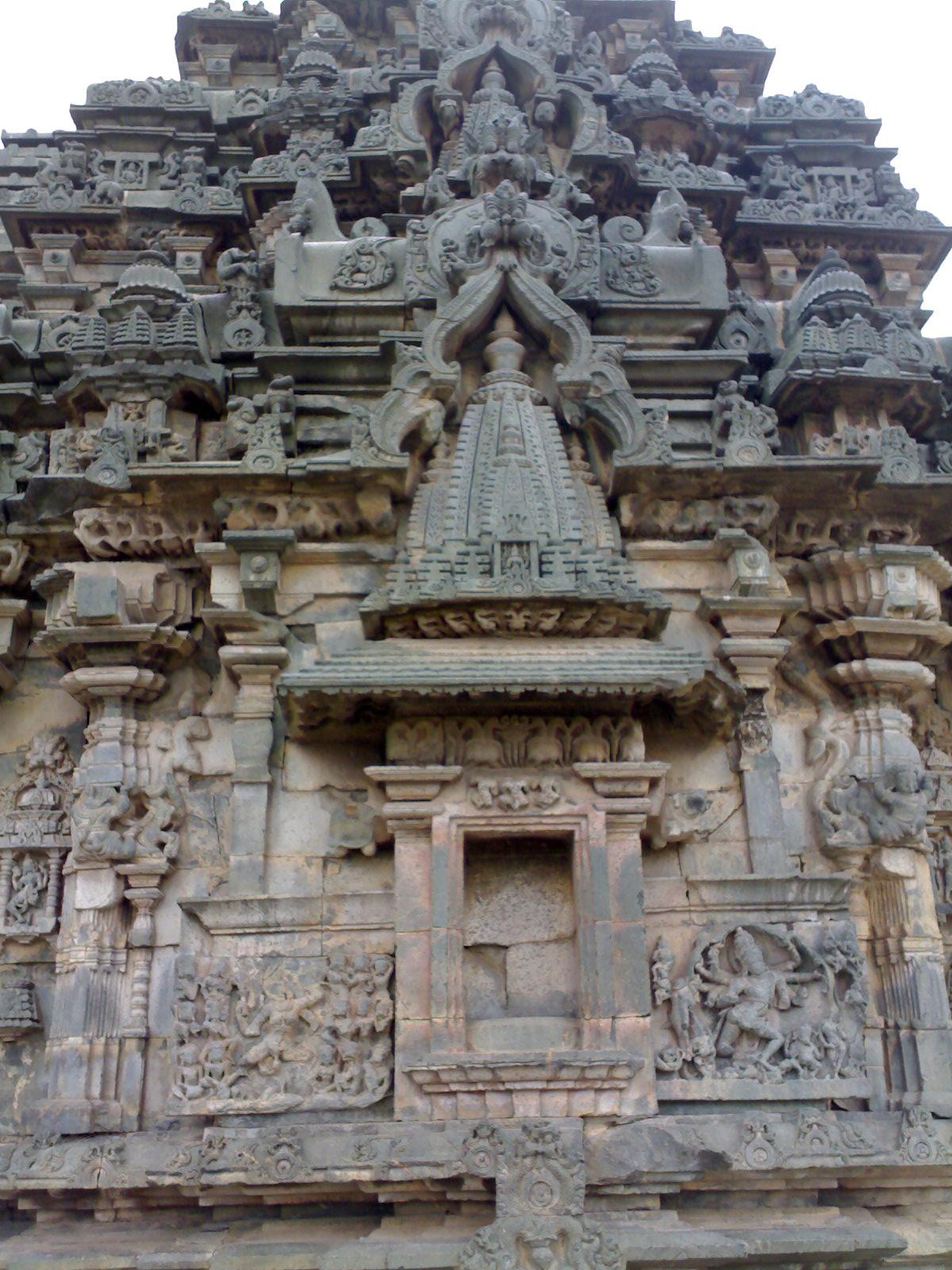
Kirtimukha decoration at Kasivisvesvara Temple, Lakkundi

Western Chalukya architecture (Kannada: ಪಶ್ಚಿಮ ಚಾಲುಕ್ಯ ವಾಸ್ತುಶಿಲ್ಪ), also known as Kalyani Chalukya or Later Chalukya architecture, is the distinctive style of ornamented architecture in the Shaiva, Vaishnava, and Jain religious traditions that evolved during the rule of the Western Chalukya Empire in the Tungabhadra region of central Karnataka, in the 11th and 12th centuries. Western Chalukyan political influence was at its peak in the Deccan Plateau during this period. The centre of cultural and temple building activity lay in the Tungabhadra region, where large medieval workshops built numerous monuments. These monuments, regional variants of pre-existing Dravida (South Indian) temples, defined the Karnata dravida tradition.

Temples of all sizes built by the Chalukyan architects during this era remain today, known as a transitional style and provides an architectural link between the style of the early Chalukya dynasty and that of the later Hoysala Empire.

=== Lakkundi temples ===
Lakkundi in Gadag district is a tiny village on the way to Hospet from Hubli. It is one of the fine architectural feasts of the Kalyana Chalukya period (about 10th century). Currently, Lakkundi has about 50 temples of various stature and antiquity. All the temples are made of green schist and the outer walls and entrances are very richly decorated. The shikhara is an in-between-style type and the parapet and the artistic division of the wall with pilasters is typical of the south-Indian style. It is also known for Step wells and historic inscriptions. The centre of cultural and temple building activity lay in the Tungabhadra region, where large medieval workshops built numerous monuments. These monuments, regional variants of pre-existing Dravida (South Indian) temples, defined the Karnataka Dravida tradition.

=== Kashivisvanatha Temple ===
A great deal of care has gone into the construction of the Kashivisvanatha Temple in Lakkundi, which deifies Shiva. This temple has a unique feature: a small Surya (Sun) shrine faces the main shrine on the west. There is a common platform between both, which must have been an open mandapa originally. Hence, the Kashivisvanatha Temple has an entrance on the east side and south side of the mandapa. The entrance doorway and the towers are covered with close intricate carvings. The shikhara (dome) is in the North-Indian style and it looks like a lathe must have been used to make the complex circular pillars.

=== Brahma Jainalaya ===
Brahma Jaina Basti built by queen Attimabbe is the largest and oldest of many Jain temples in Lakkundi. This temple is dedicated to Mahavira, the most revered saint of Jainism. The temple has a garbhagriha shrine and mandapa style with deep beams on the mandapa from where the eaves are cantilevered. The large Jaina temple, among the many temples at Lakkundi, also near Gadag, is perhaps one of the earliest examples of temples in this area built of a kind of fine-textured chloritic schist as distinct from the hitherto-used sandstone of this region.

The new material, because of its less thick quarry-sizes and tractability, reacted on the workmanship, with the result that the masonry-courses became reduced in size and the carvings more delicate and highly finished. The temple, perhaps built in the latter half of the 11th century, has a five-storeyed vimana (tower), square on plan from the base to the shikhara, and had originally a closed square navaranga in front, though an open mandapa was added in front later on. The central bay of the navaranga is a larger square than the peripheral eight around it. The second storey, as in the Jaina temple at Pattadakkal, is functional and has an antarala-mantapa in front over the vestibule of the lower storey. This raises the total height of the vimana considerably.

=== Mahadeva Temple ===
Mahadeva Temple at Itagi in the Koppal district, built in 1112, is an example of Dravida articulation with a nagara superstructure, dedicated to Shiva and is among the larger temples built by the Western Chalukyas and perhaps the most famous. Inscriptions hail it as the 'Emperor among temples'. Here, the main temple, the sanctum of which has a linga, is surrounded by thirteen minor shrines, each with its own linga. The temple has two other shrines, dedicated to Murthinarayana and Chandraleshwari, parents of Mahadeva, the Chalukya commanders who consecrated the temple in 1112.

=== Siddhesvara Temple ===
Siddhesvara Temple at Haveri, has a staggered square plan with dravida articulation and superstructure of 11th century vintage, to which some innovative 12th century elements such as aedicules, miniature decorative towers on pilasters, were added. The temple is built of soapstone. The temple bears close resemblance to a few other Chalukyan temples in the vicinity of Haveri; the Muktesvara Temple at Chavudayyadanapura, the Somesvara Temple at Haralhalli and the Siddharamesvara Temple at Niralgi. The entire basement of this temple has sunk by a few feet, making it necessary to descend into the open mantapa (hall).

=== Dodda Basappa Temple ===
The Dodda Basappa Temple at Dambal, a 12th-century Chalukyan temple, is of the Western Chalukya architectural style. It has a unique 24-pointed, uninterrupted stellate (star-shaped), 7-tiered dravida plan, for the vimana with so many star points that it almost becomes circular in appearance. Each right angle is divided into four 22.5 degrees angles. Then each angle is again divided and covered with intricate carvings.

=== Trikuteshwara Shiva Temple ===
The Trikuteshwara Shiva Temple at Gadag, dated between 1050 and 1200, has ornate pillars with intricate sculpture with three Shivalingas enshrined in the sanctum. It has three lingas mounted on the same stone. Beautifully chiselled stone screens and carved figurines are also seen in the temple. The Saraswati shrine within the Trikuteshwara temple complex has exquisite stone columns.

=== Sudi monuments ===
Sudi is famous for rare stone-carved monuments like twin-towered temple with large well built stone carvings. At one time it was a key town of the Kalyani Chalukyas, during 1000. Besides these structures there is a tower (called Hude in native language) located in the centre of the Sudi village. Several stone temples built by Maha Samanthadhipati Naga Deva in 1100 have caught the attention of Karnataka State Archaeological Department. Quite a few of these structures have been cleaned up.

== Hoysala architecture ==
Hoysala architecture

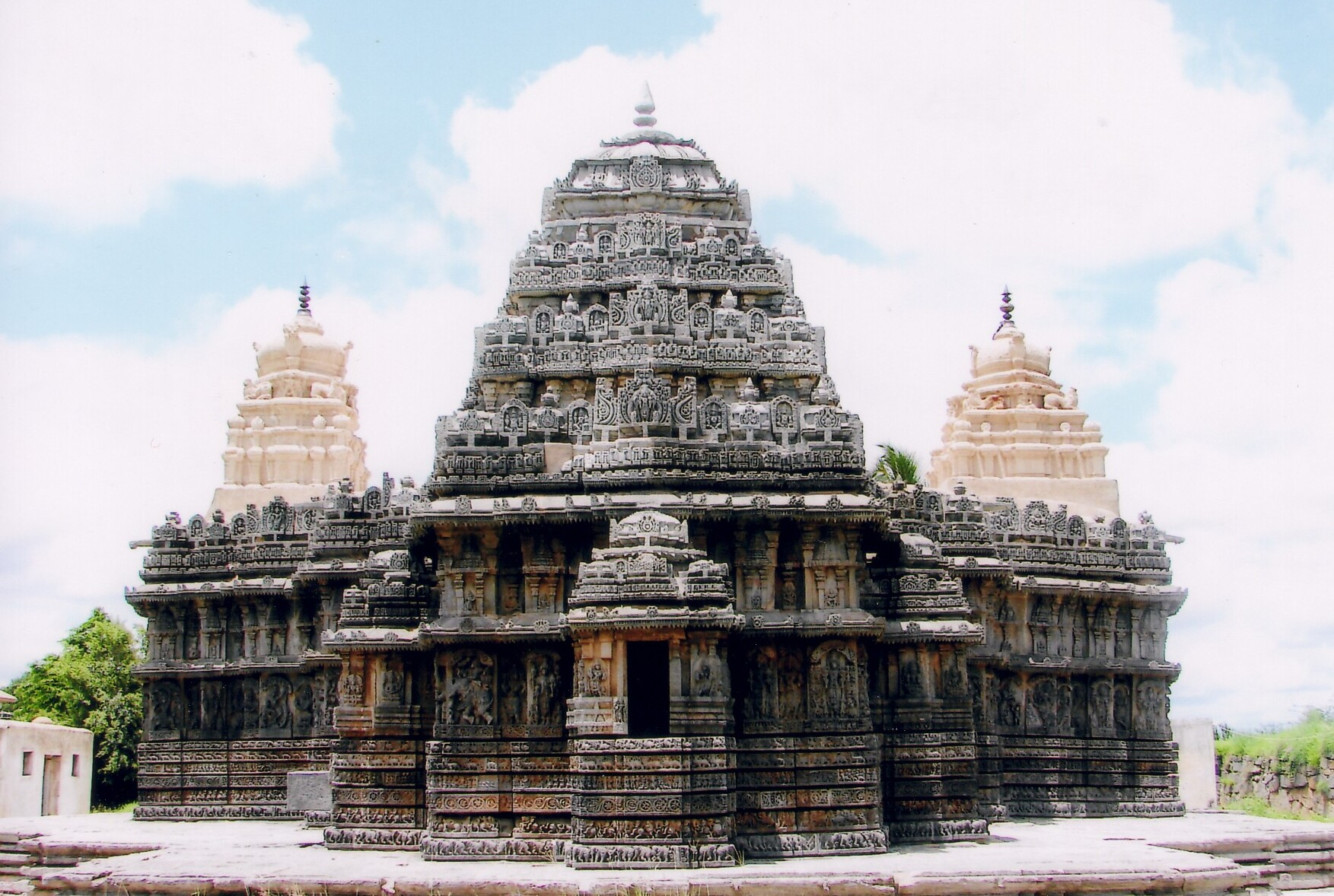
Lakshmi Narasimha Temple, Nuggehalli

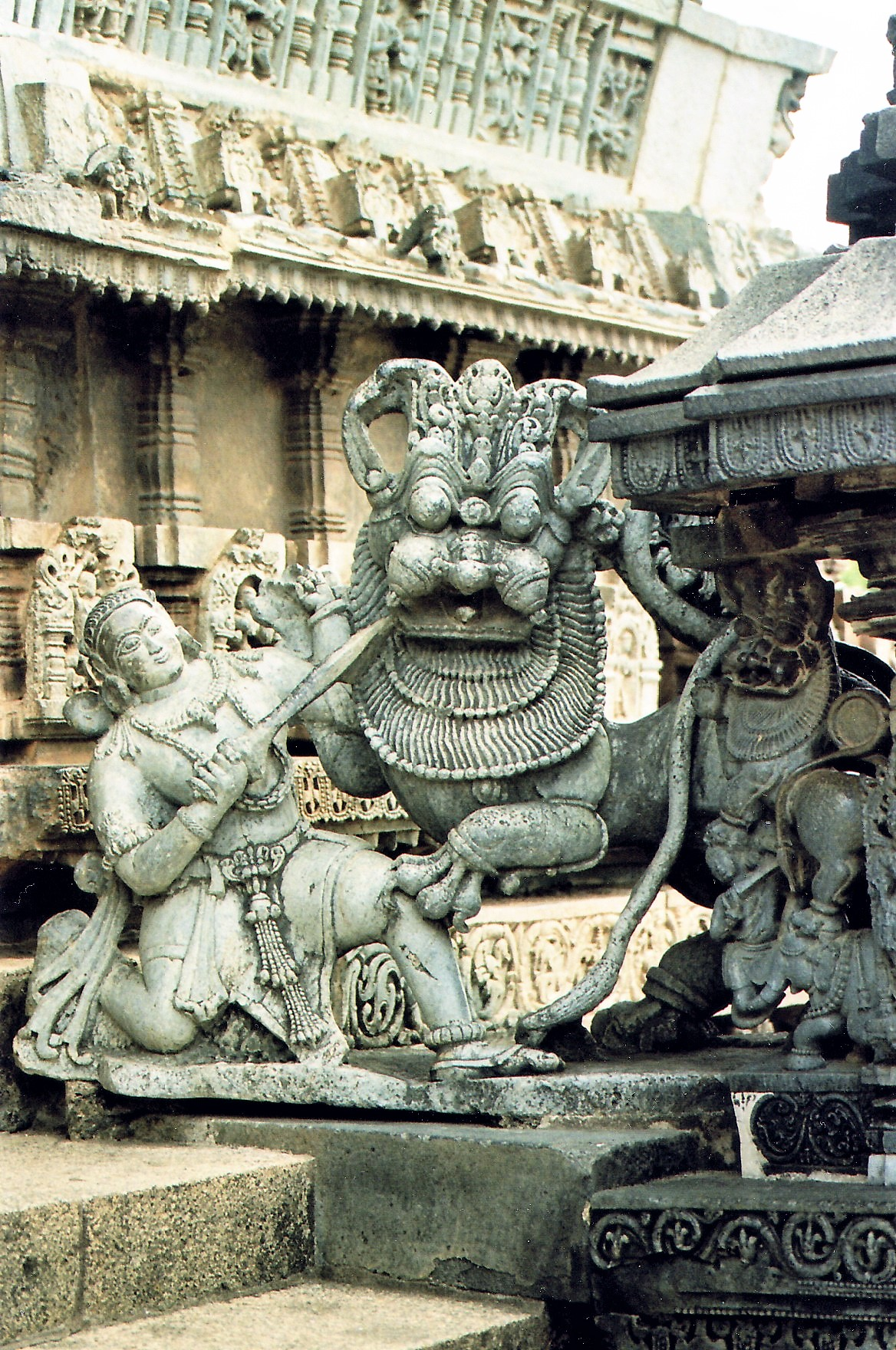
Sala fighting the tiger, the symbol of Hoysala Empire in Belur

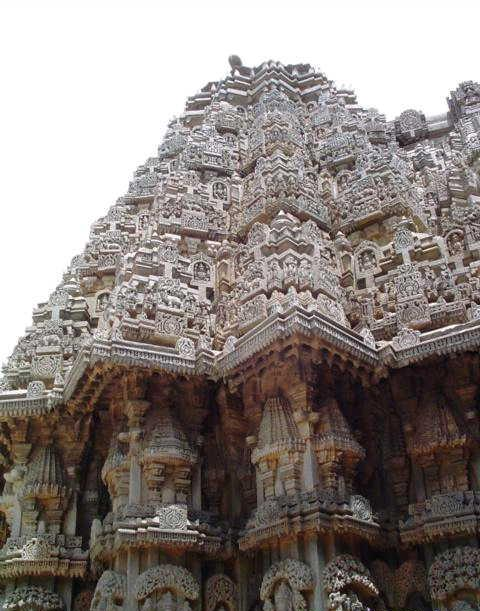
Star shaped Vimana at Somanathapura

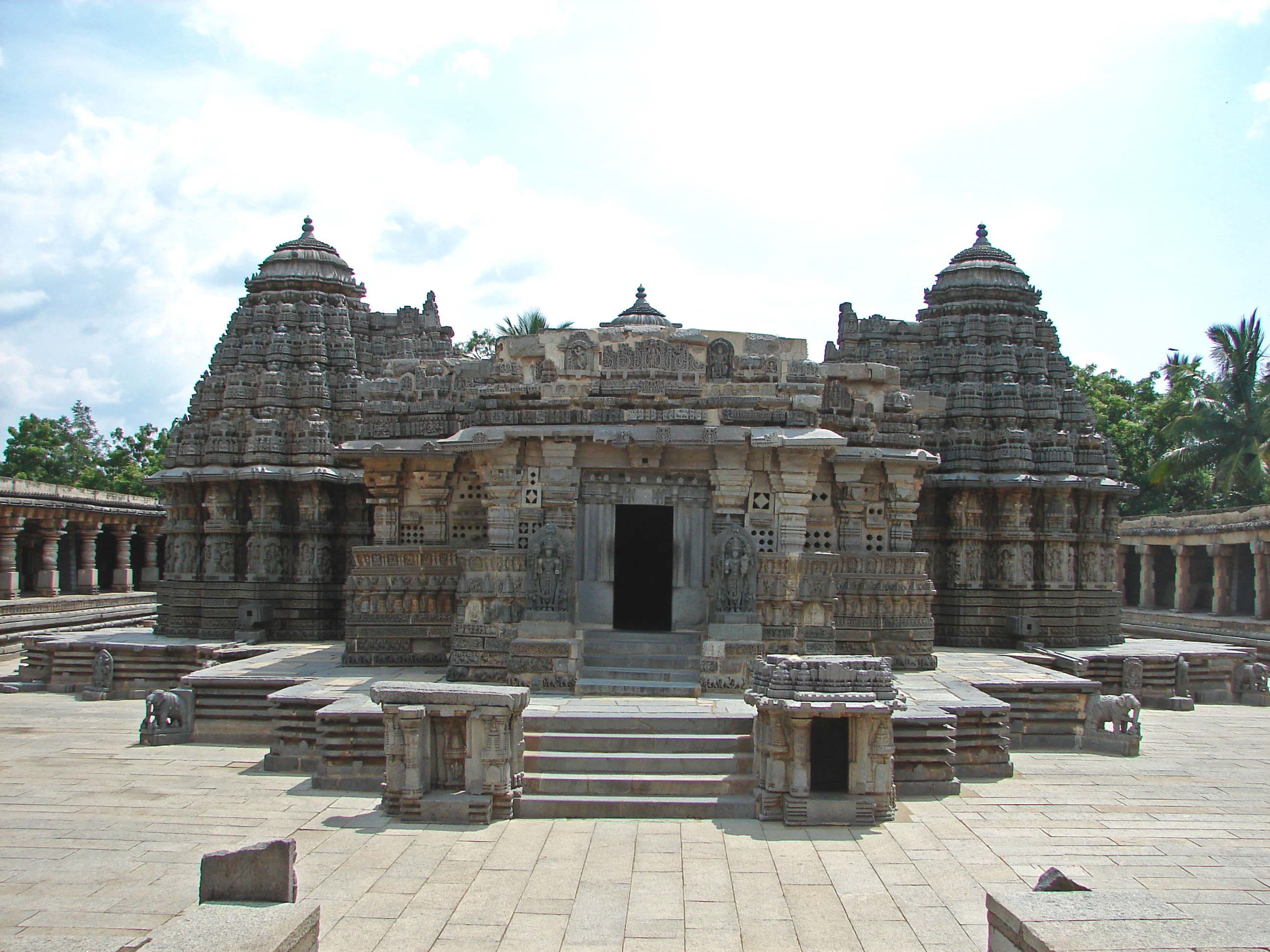
Symmetrical architecture on jagati at Somanathapura

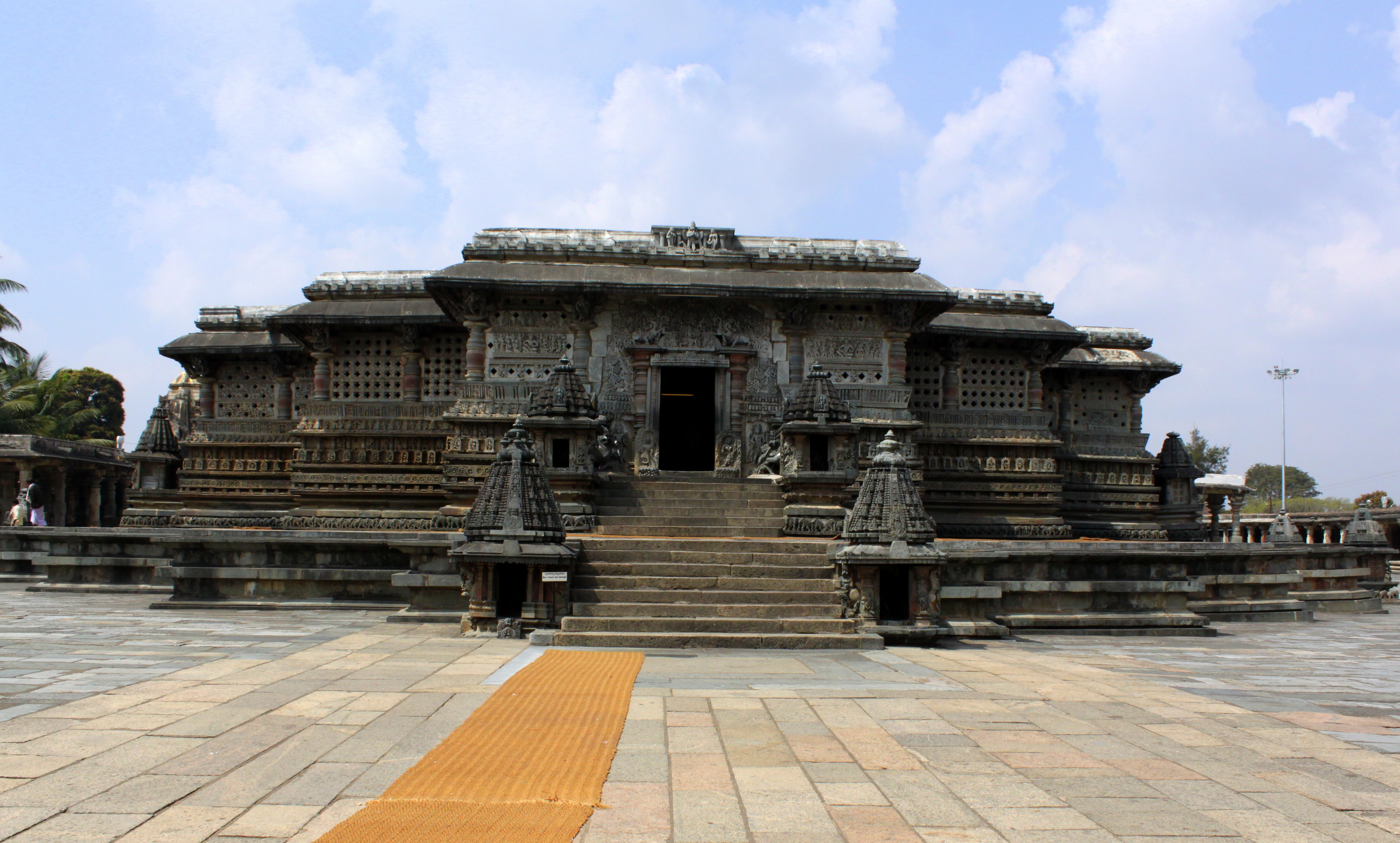
Chennakesava Temple, Belur

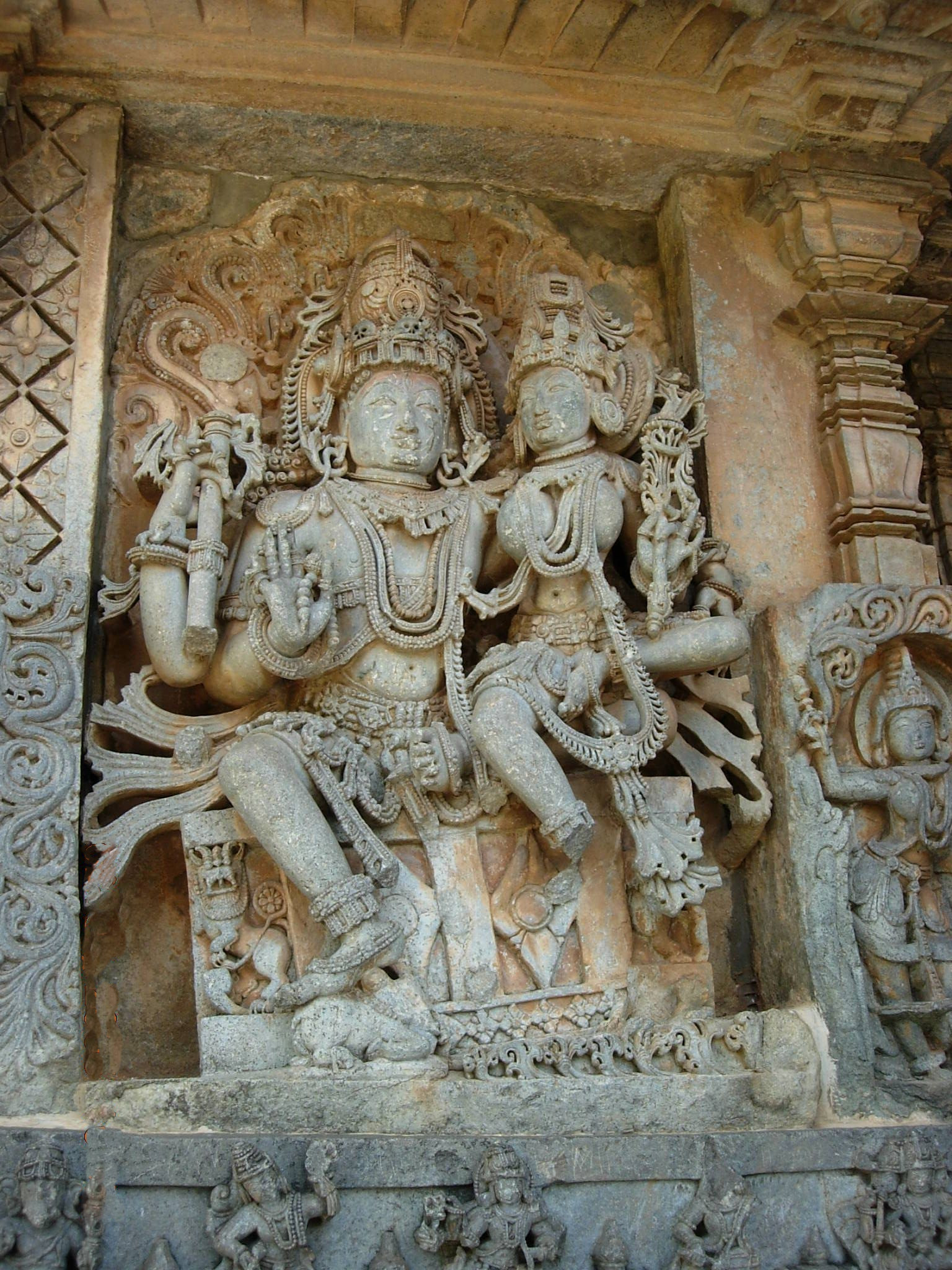
Hoysala carving of Vishnu and his consort Lakshmi from a Belur-Halebid temple

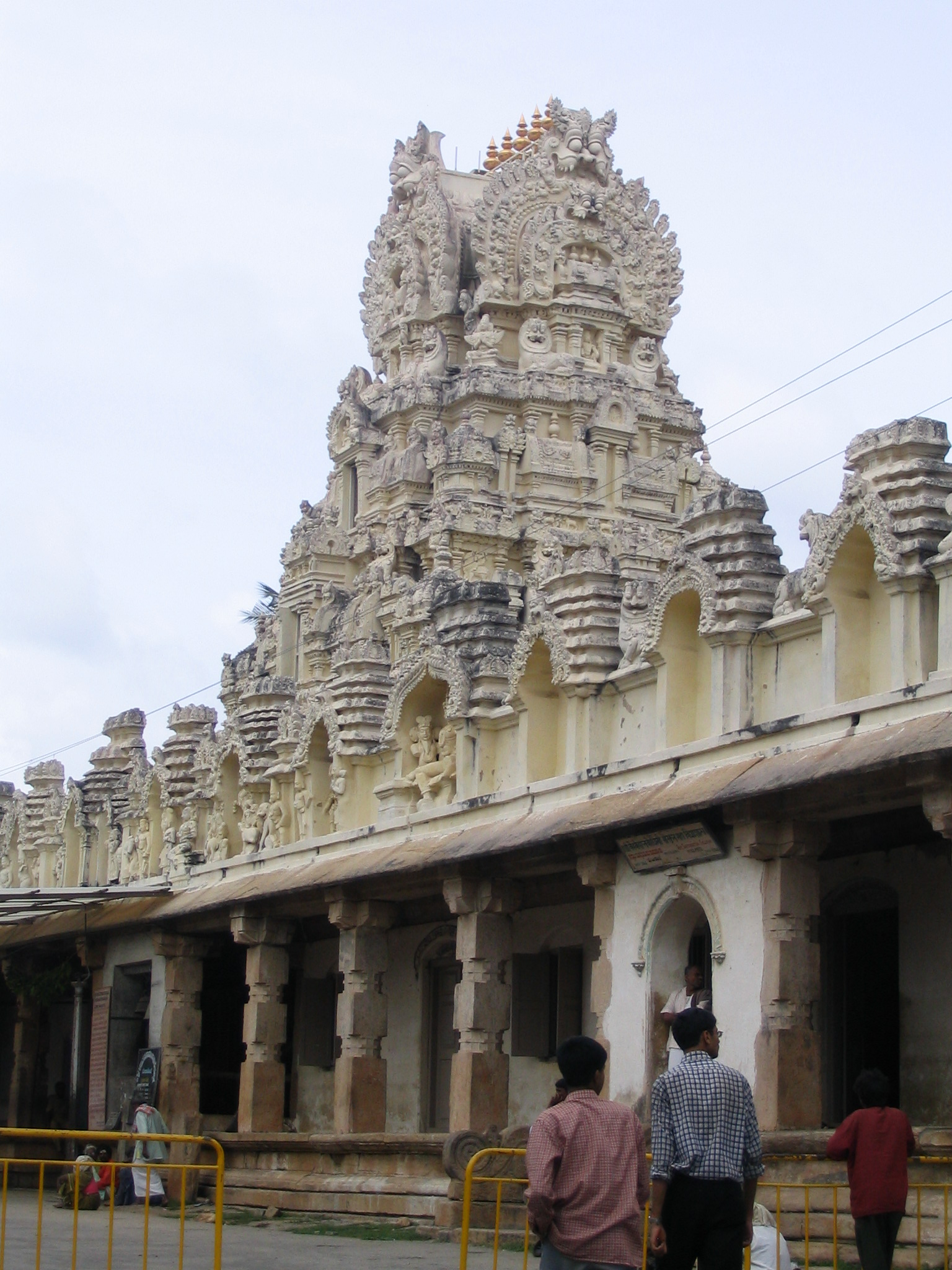
Cheluva-Narayana Swamy Temple, Melukote

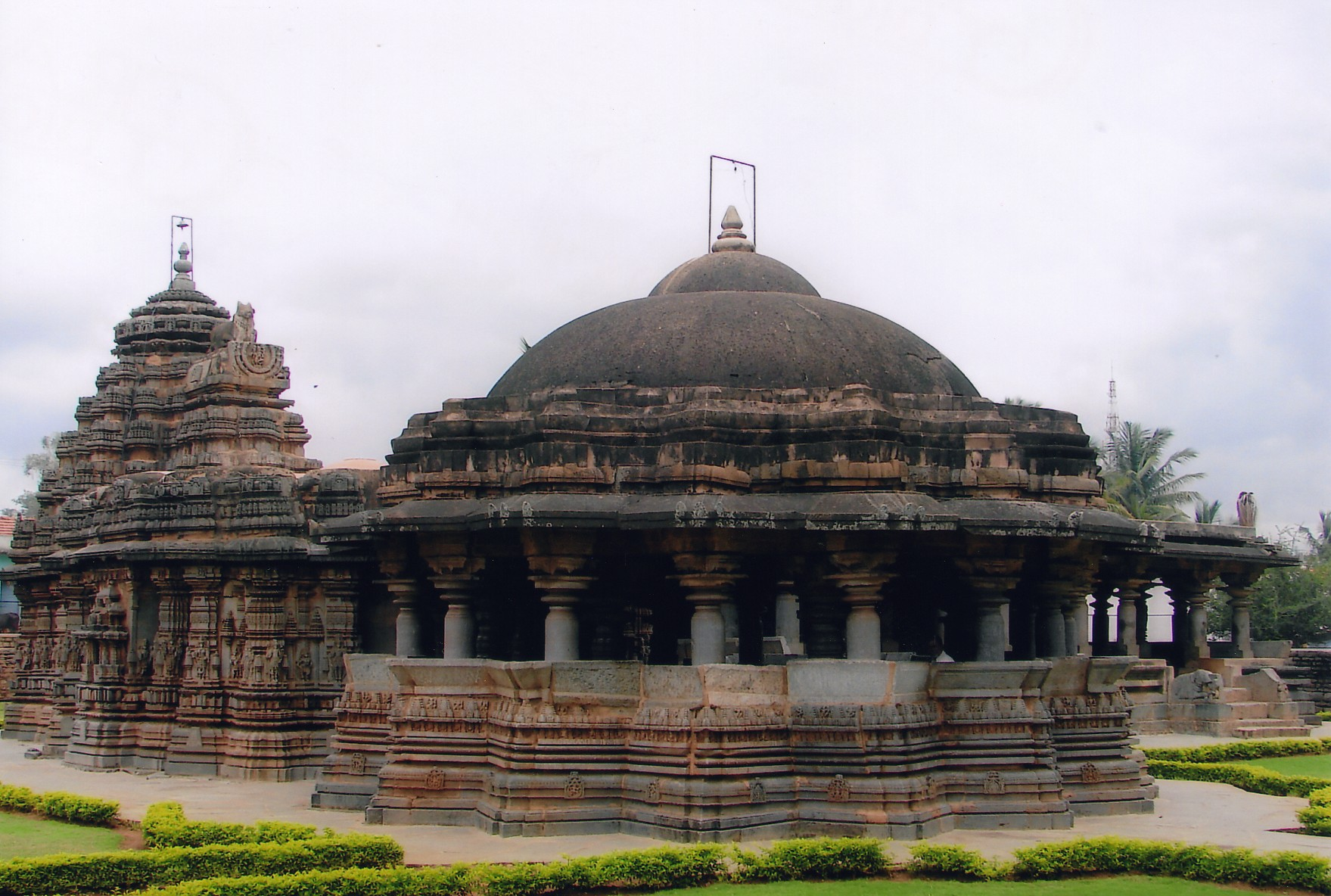
Ishvara temple at Arasikere with an unusual 16-pointed stellate (star) mantapa (hall)

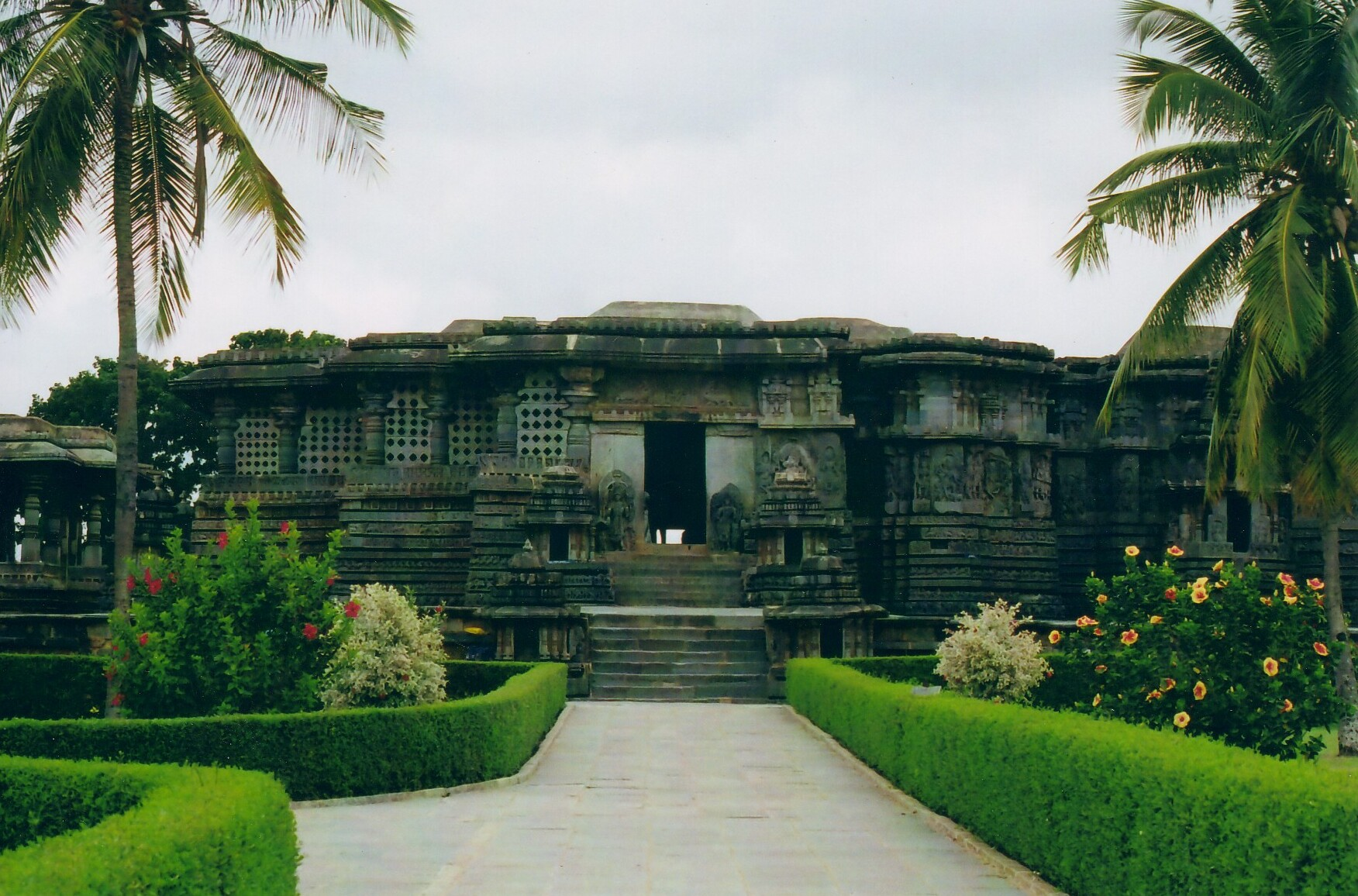
Siva and Parvathi – Hoysaleswara Temple

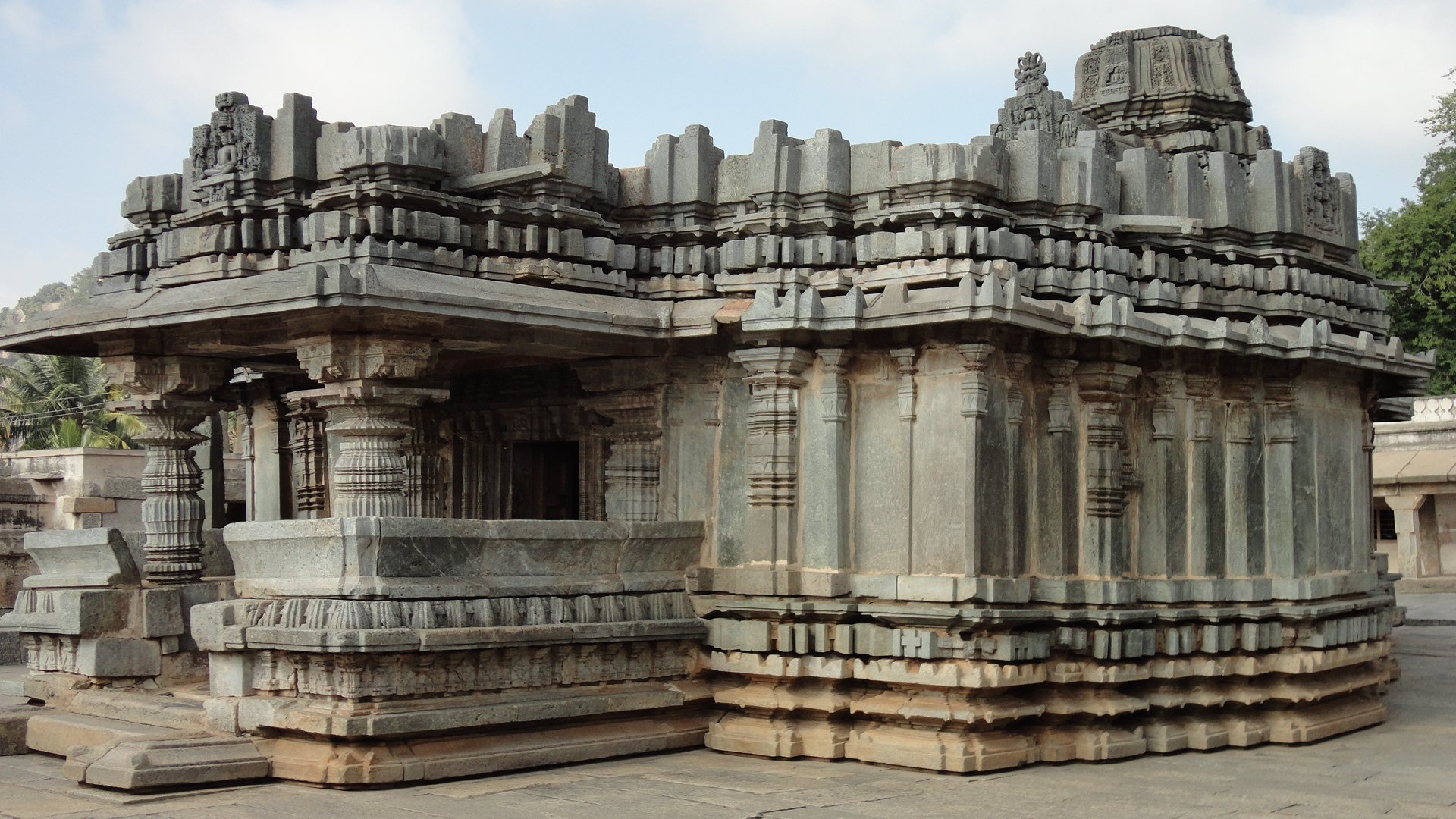
Akkana Basadi

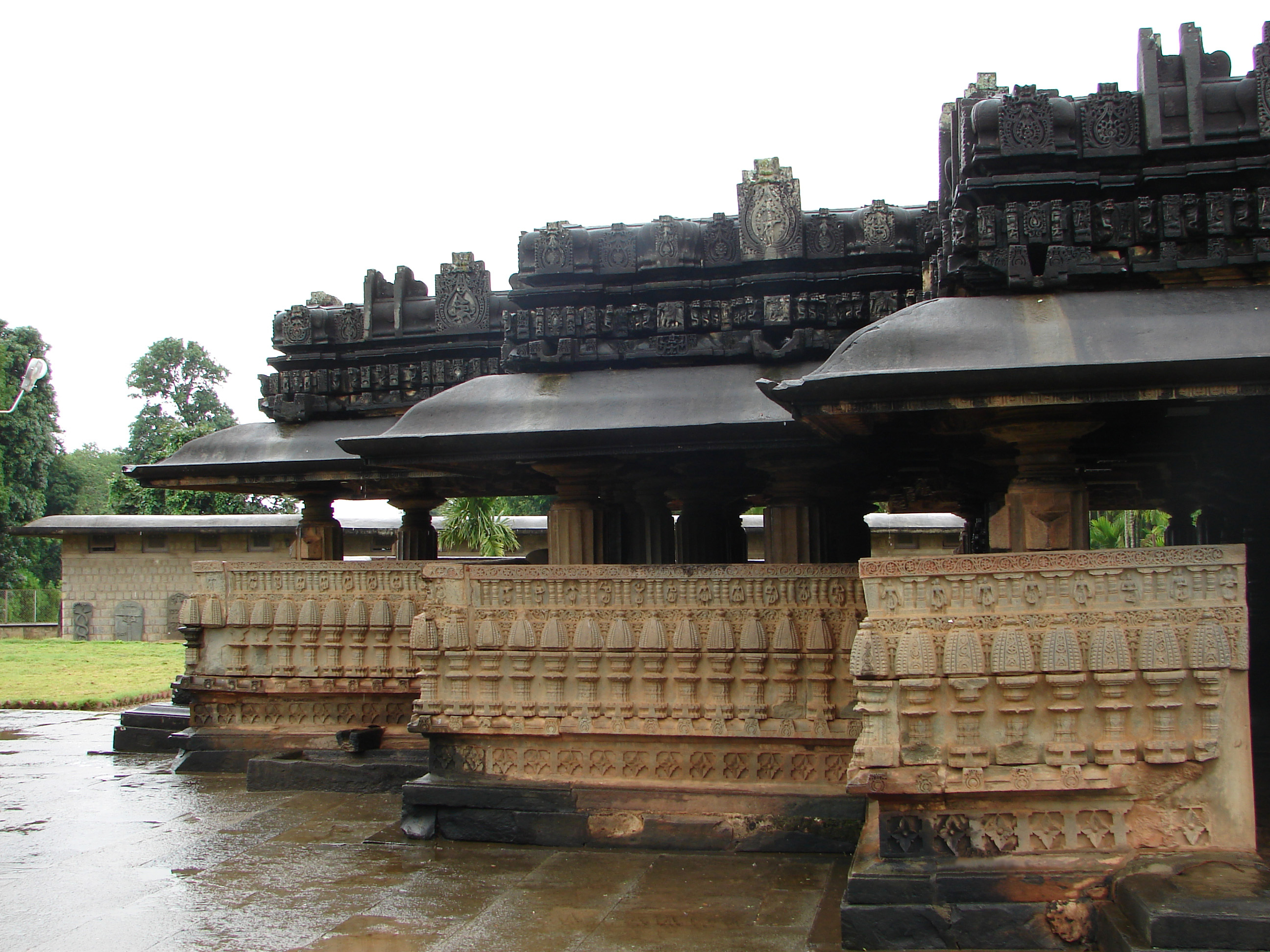
Kedareshvara Temple, Balligavi

The Hoysala architecture style is an offshoot of the Western Chalukya style, which was popular in the 10th and 11th centuries. It is distinctively Dravidian, and owing to its unique features, Hoysala architecture qualifies as an independent style. The Hoysala sculpture in all its richness is said to be a challenge to photography. The artistry of the Hoysalas in stone has been compared to the finesse of an ivory worker or a goldsmith. The abundance of jewellery worn by the sculpted figures and the variety of hairstyles and headdresses depicted give a fair idea of the lifestyles of the Hoysala times.

Some of the famous temples of the Hoysala architectural style are the Kesava Temple at Somanathapura, Chennakesava Temple at Belur, Chikkamagalur Amruthapura Temple, Chennakesava Temple at Aralaguppe, the Hoysaleswara Temple at Halebidu, Cheluvanarayana Swamy Temple at Melkote.

=== Somanathapura ===
Somanathapura is famous for the Chennakeshava Temple, Somanathapura (also called Kesava or Keshava Temple) built by Soma, a dandanayaka (commander) in 1268 under Hoysala king Narasimha III, when the Hoysalas were the major power in South India. The Keshava Temple is one of the finest examples of Hoysala architecture and is in a well preserved condition. Somnathpur, however, is truly unique in design, perfect in symmetry and the stone carvings are remarkable marvels in stone.

=== Chennakesava Temple at Belur ===
The Chennakesava Temple at Belur, originally called Vijayanarayana Temple, built on the banks of the Yagachi River in Belur, an early capital of the Hoysala Empire, is one of the finest examples of Hoysala architecture. It was built by king Vishnuvardhana in commemoration of his victory over the Cholas at Talakad in 1117. The facade of the temple is filled with intricate sculptures and friezes with no portion left blank. Inside the temple are a number of ornate pillars. The temple is about 30 metres (98 ft) in height and has an impressive entrance gopuram (tower), built in Dravidian style. A group of subsidiary shrines surround the main shrine in the centre of a rectangular navaranga (hall). The navaranga (hall) supported by forty-six pillars, each of a different design, has three entrances guarded by decorated doorkeepers.

=== Hoysaleswara Temple ===
The Hoysaleswara Temple at Halebidu, was built by Ketamala and attributed to Vishnuvardhana. The temple complex comprises two Hindu temples, the Hoysaleshawara and Kedareshwara temples and two Jain basadis. It enshrines Hoysaleswara and Shantaleswara, named after the temple builder Vishnuvardhana Hoysala and his wife, Queen Shantala.

The Hoysaleswara Temple, dating back to the 1121, is astounding for its wealth of sculptural details. The temple is a simple dvikuta vimana (two-shrined), one for "Hoysaleswara" and the other for "Shantaleswara" (after Shantala Devi, queen of king Vishnuvardhana) and is built with chloritic schist (also known as soapstone). The temple complex as a whole is elevated on a jagati (platform), a feature that became popular in contemporary Hoysala designs. The walls of the temple are covered with an endless variety of depictions from Hindu mythology, animals, birds and Shilabalikas or dancing figures. Yet no two sculptures of the temple are the same. This magnificent temple guarded by a Nandi Bull was never completed, despite 86 years of labour. The temple of Halebidu, has been described as an "outstanding example of Hindu architecture" and as the "supreme climax of Indian architecture".

=== Ishvara Temple ===
The Ishvara Temple in Arasikere, dates to 1220 rule of Hoysala Empire. Arasikere (lit "Queens tank"; 'Arasi' means "queen" or "princess" and 'kere' means "tank" in the Kannada language). The temple, though modest in size and figure sculpture, is considered the most complex in architecture among surviving Hoysala monuments because of its ground plan: a 16-pointed star shaped mantapa (hall), in addition to an asymmetrical star shaped shrine, whose star points are of three different types.

The temple, which faces east like all Hoysala constructions, uses soapstone as basic building material and is an ekakuta shrine (single shrine or cella) with two mantapas, one open and one closed. All three units are connected to form a unity. The elegantly decorated ceilings, the domical ceiling of the open mantapa, the sculptures of Dwarapalakas (door keepers) in the closed mantapa (also called navaranga), the wall panel images numbering 120 (on pilasters between aedicules–miniature towers) carved on the outer walls are noteworthy.

=== Melkote Cheluvanarayana Swamy Temple ===
The Cheluvanarayana Swamy Temple, located in Melkote built on rocky hills is a square building of large dimensions but very plain, dedicated to Cheluva-Narayana Swamy or Tirunarayana. Mysore Archaeological Department states, on the strength of epigraphic evidence, that the presiding deity of this temple was already a well known idol of worship before Sri Ramanujacharya, the Srivaishnava saint worshipped at the shrine in December 1098 and even before he came to the Mysore region and that very probably he used his influence to rebuild or renovate the temple. The temple is richly endowed, having been under the special patronage of the Mysore Wodeyars, and has a most valuable collection of jewels.

=== Lakshminarasimha Swamy Temple ===
The Lakshminarasimha Swamy Temple is a good example of a richly decorated Hoysala temple built in the trikuta (three towers) vimana (prayer hall) style with fine sculptures adorning the walls. The material used is Chloritic Schist (Soapstone) and the temple is built on a jagati (platform) that closely follows the plan of the temple. This is a Hoysala innovation. The Jagati is in perfect unity with the rest of the temple and the temple is built on a jagati (platform) that closely follows the plan of the temple. The size of the original temple can be considered small, to which a larger open mantapa (hall) was later added. The three shrines are located around a central closed mantapa with 9 bays. The ceiling of the closed mantapa is supported by four lathe turned pillars and is deeply domed in the centre. The ceiling of the closed mantapa is supported by four lathe turned pillars and is deeply domed in the centre. The central shrine is the most prominent and has a large tower. This shrine has a vestibule that connects the shrine to the mandapa. Consequently, the vestibule also has a tower that looks like an extension of the main tower and is called the sukanasi or nose. The other two shrines have smaller towers and because they have no vestibule to connect them to the central mantapa, they have no sukanasi.

== Vijayanagara architecture ==
Vijayanagara architecture

Hampi UNESCO Monument of Vijayanagara architecture fusion of Chalukya, Hoysala, Pandya and Chola styles

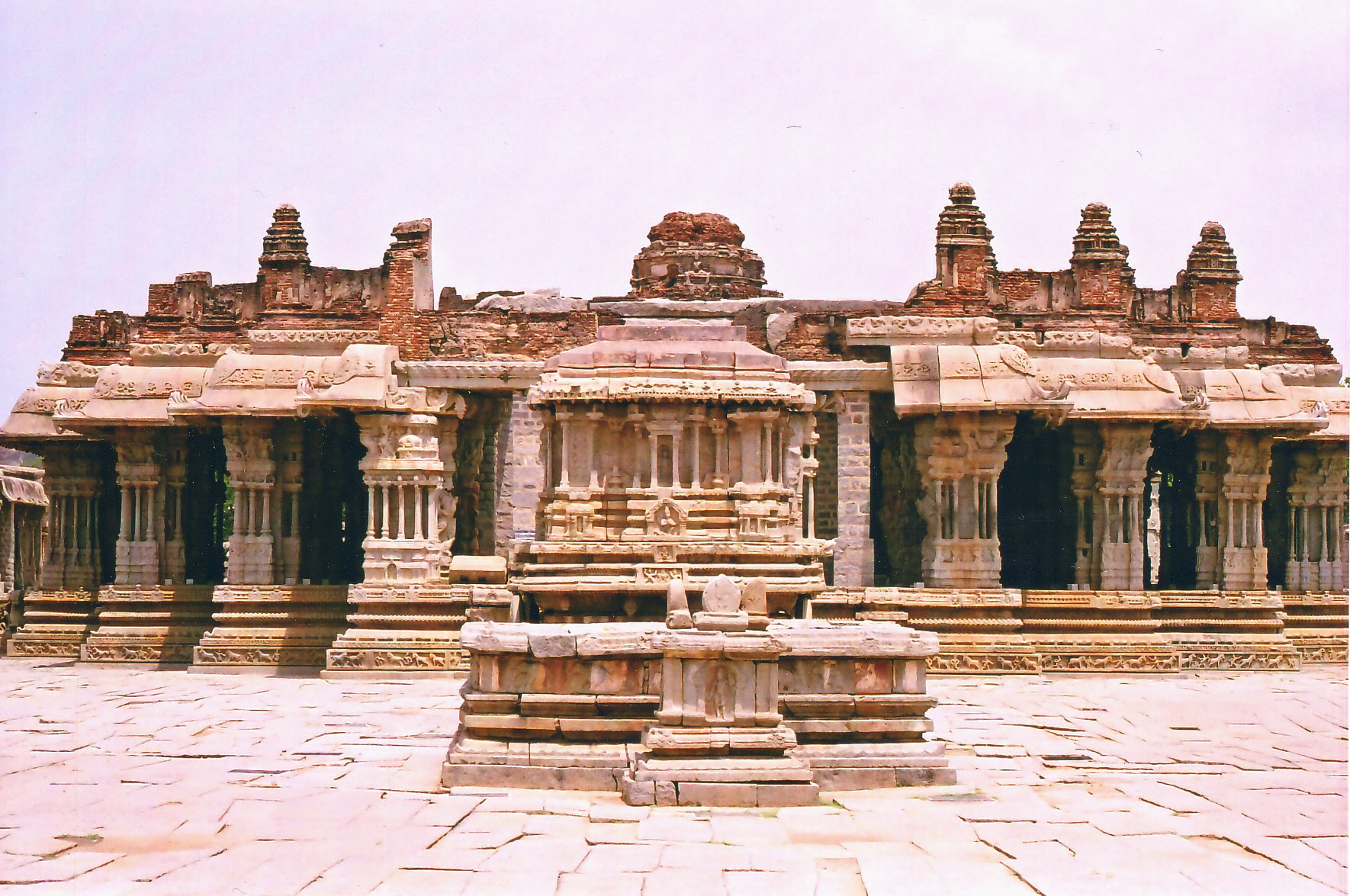
Vitthala temple with musical pillars, Hoysala style multigonal base, Hampi

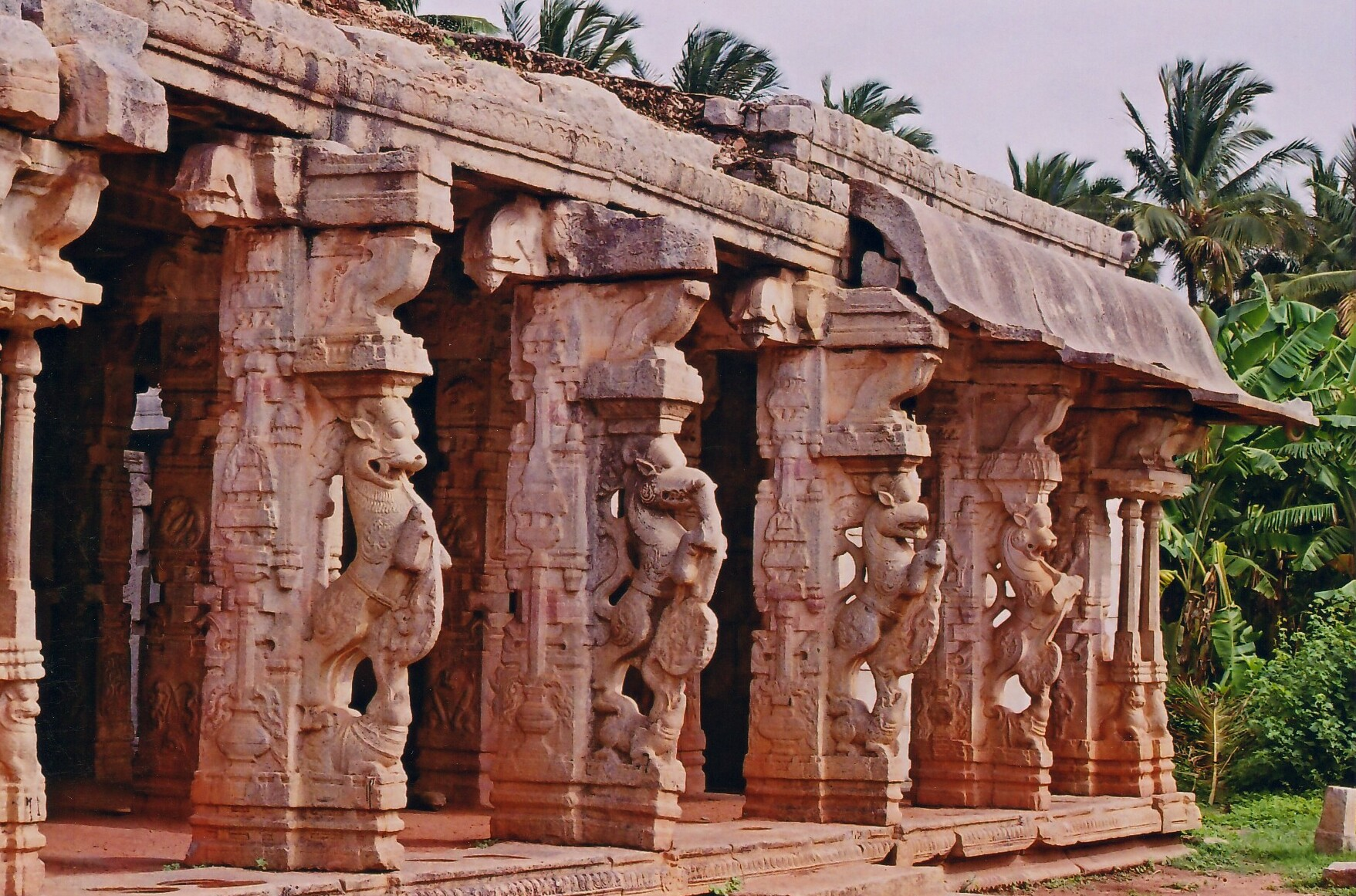
Pillars with Hippogryphs at Hampi

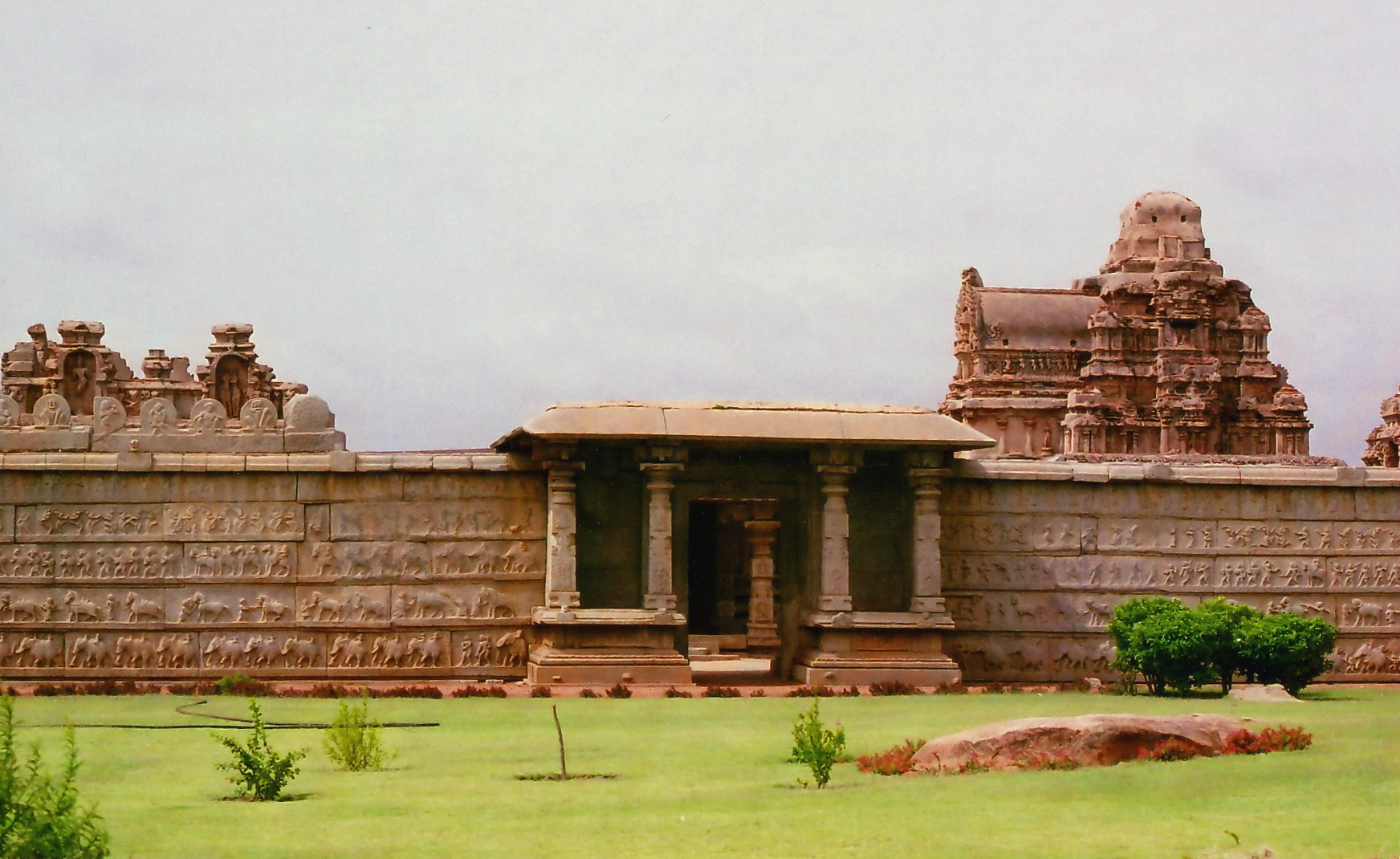
Temple wall, Hoysala style carvings at Hampi

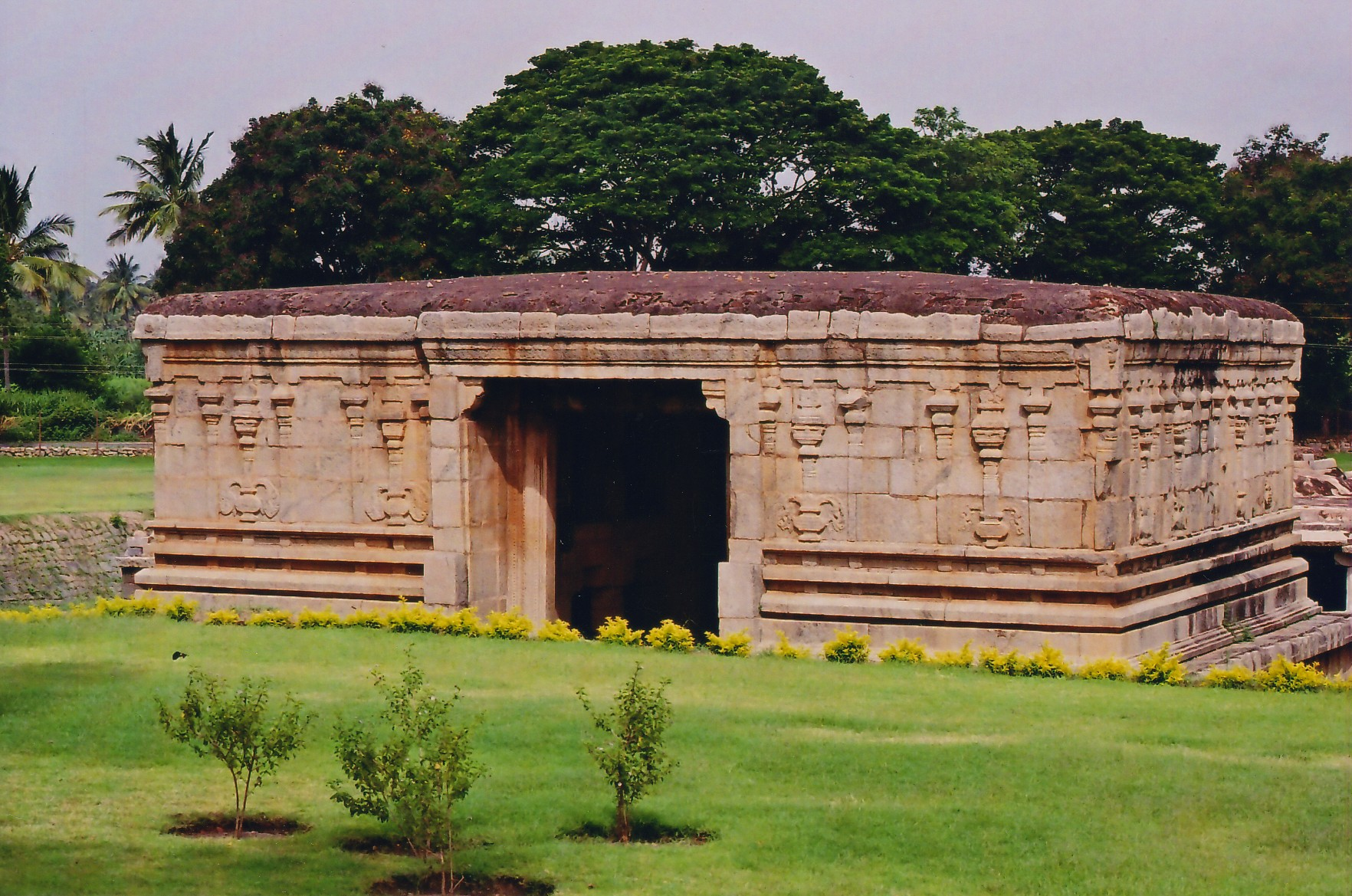
Unearthed Underground Vishnu temple

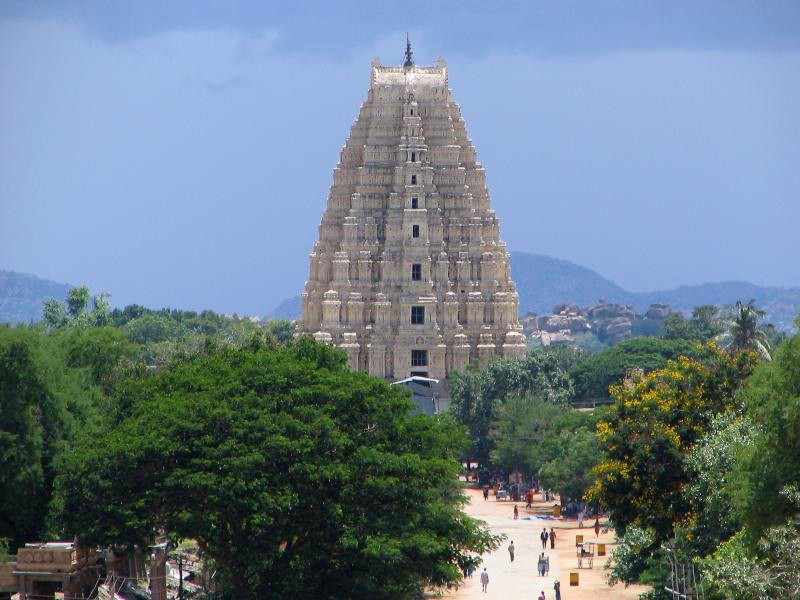
Vijayanagar Raja Gopura at Hampi

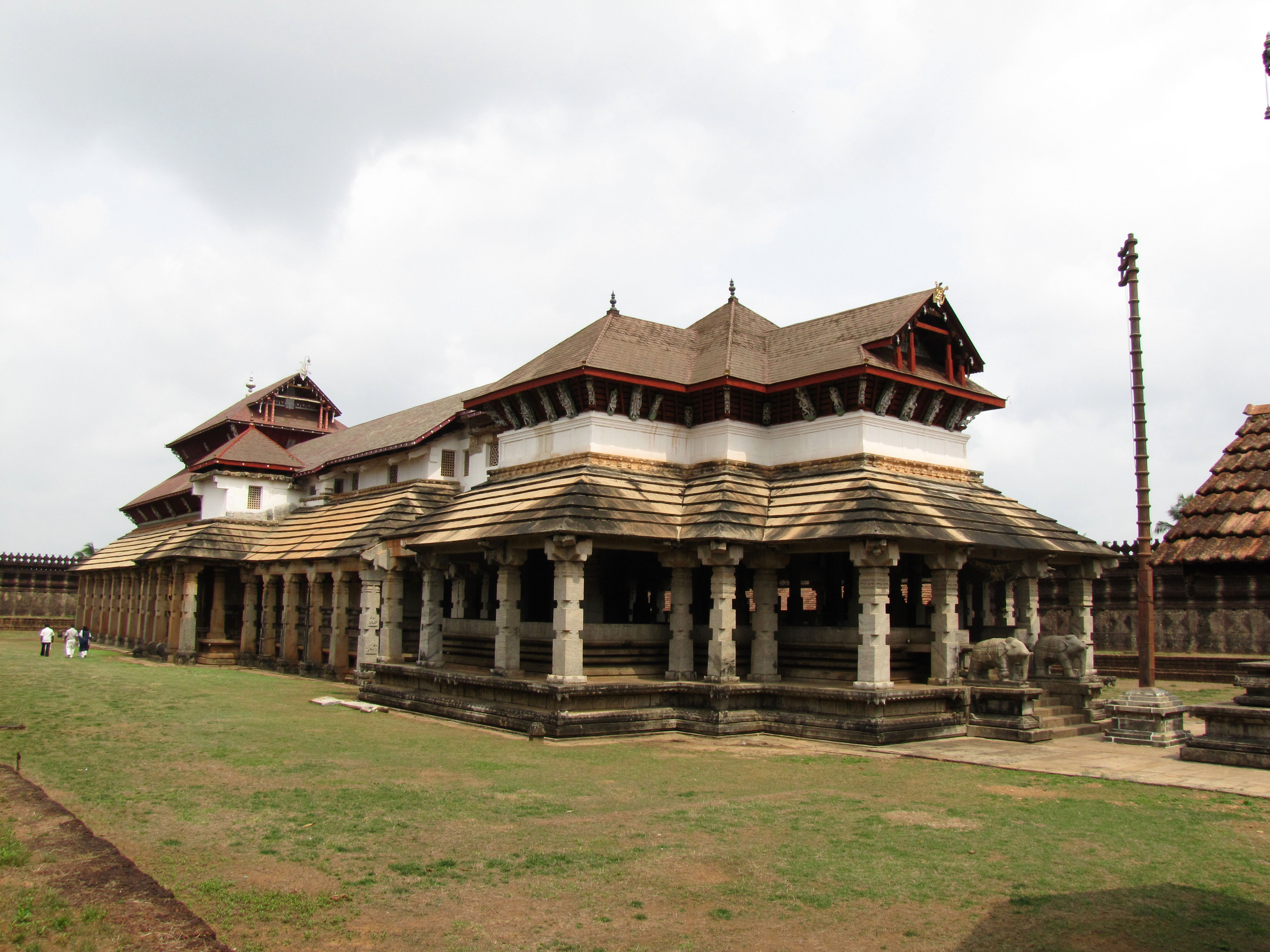
Saavira Kambada Basadi

Vijayanagara architecture is a vibrant combination of the Chalukya, Hoysala, Pandya and Chola styles, idioms that prospered in previous centuries.

Ruins of Hampi – UNESCO World Heritage Site Virupaksha Temple, Krishna Temple, Vittala Temple, Ugra Narasimha and Kodandarama Temple are some of the famous monuments of the Vijayanagar style.

Its legacy of sculpture, architecture and painting influenced the development of the arts long after the empire came to an end. Its stylistic hallmark is the ornate pillared Kalyanamantapa (marriage hall), Vasanthamantapa (open pillared halls) and the Rajagopura (tower). While the empire's monuments are spread over the whole of Southern India, nothing surpasses the vast open-air theatre of monuments at its capital at Vijayanagara, a UNESCO World Heritage Site.

In the 14th century the kings continued to build Vesara or Deccan style monuments but later incorporated dravida-style gopurams to meet their ritualistic needs. The Prasanna Virupaksha Temple (underground temple) of Bukka Raya I and the Hazare Rama Temple of Deva Raya I are examples of Deccan architecture. The varied and intricate ornamentation of the pillars is a mark of their work. At Hampi, though the Vitthala Temple is the best example of their pillared Kalyanamantapa style, the Hazara Ramaswamy Temple is a modest but perfectly finished example. A grand specimen of Vijayanagara art, the Vitthala Temple, took several decades to complete during the reign of the Tuluva kings.

Another element of the Vijayanagara style is the carving of large monoliths such as the Sasivekalu (mustard) Ganesha and Kadalekalu (Ground nut) Ganesha at Hampi, the Gomateshwara statues in Karkala and Venur, and the Nandi bull in Lepakshi. The Vijayanagara Temples of Bhatkal, Kanakagiri, Sringeri and other towns of coastal Karnataka, as well as Tadpatri, Lepakshi, Ahobilam, Tirupati and Srikalahasti in Andhra Pradesh, and Vellore, Kumbakonam, Kanchi and Srirangam in Tamil Nadu are examples of this style. Vijayanagara art includes wall-paintings such as Dashavathara (ten incarnations of Vishnu) and Girija Kalyana (marriage of Goddess Parvati) in the Virupaksha Temple at Hampi, the Shivapurana paintings (tales of Shiva) at the Virabhadra Temple at Lepakshi, and those at the Jain basadi (temple) and the Kamaskshi and Varadaraja Temple at Kanchi. This mingling of the South Indian styles resulted in a richness not seen in earlier centuries, a focus on reliefs in addition to sculpture that surpasses that previously in India.

An aspect of Vijayanagara architecture that shows the cosmopolitanism of the great city is the presence of many secular structures bearing Islamic features. The concentration of structures like pavilions, stables and towers suggests they were for use by royalty. This harmonious exchange of architectural ideas must have happened during rare periods of peace between the Hindu and Muslim kingdoms. The "Great Platform" (Mahanavami dibba) has relief carvings in which the figures seem to have the facial features of central Asian Turks who were known to have been employed as royal attendants.

Archaeological Survey of India's recent excavations in Hampi have revealed a large number of palatial complexes and basements of several platforms including a large number of stone images, beautiful terracotta objects and stucco figures. Ceramics and variety of porcelain and inscribed Buddhist sculptures of 2nd–3rd century have also been unearthed.

The structures at Hampi would have had significant colouring unlike the sandstone tint these structures have today.

Saavira Kambada Basadi, built in the Vijayanagara style, is considered an architectural wonder. The temple is full of elaborate sculptures and decoration. The doorway of the temple has intricate carvings and is enclosed with ornate walls.. The 1000 pillars with exquisite detail, support the temple and no two pillar are alike. Saavira Kambada Basadi along with Shravanabelagola, Kamal Basadi and Brahma Jinalaya are considerest the most important Jain centers in Karnataka.

== Indo-Islamic architecture ==
Islamic architecture, Karnataka

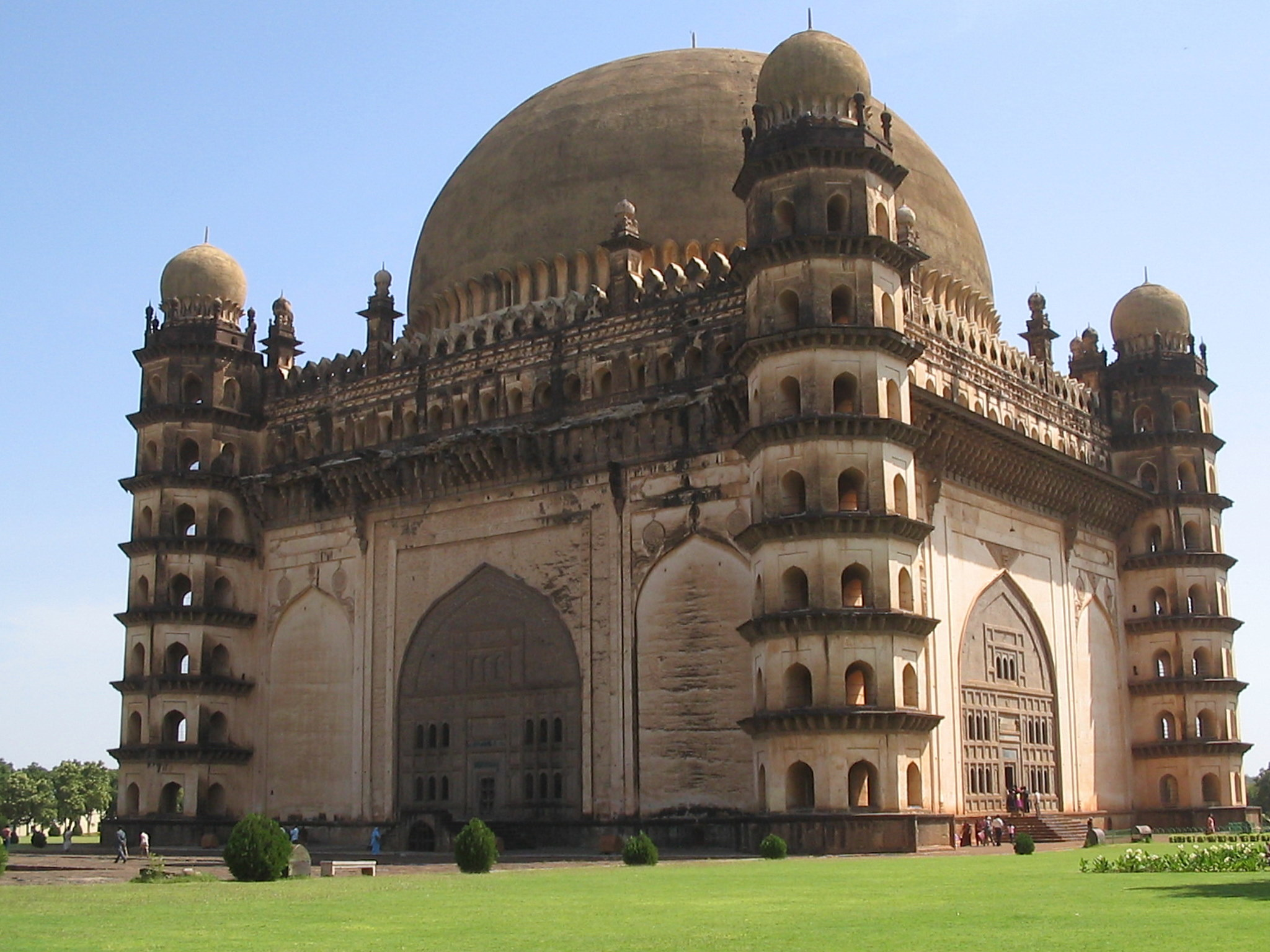
Gol Gumbaz Bijapur North Karnataka

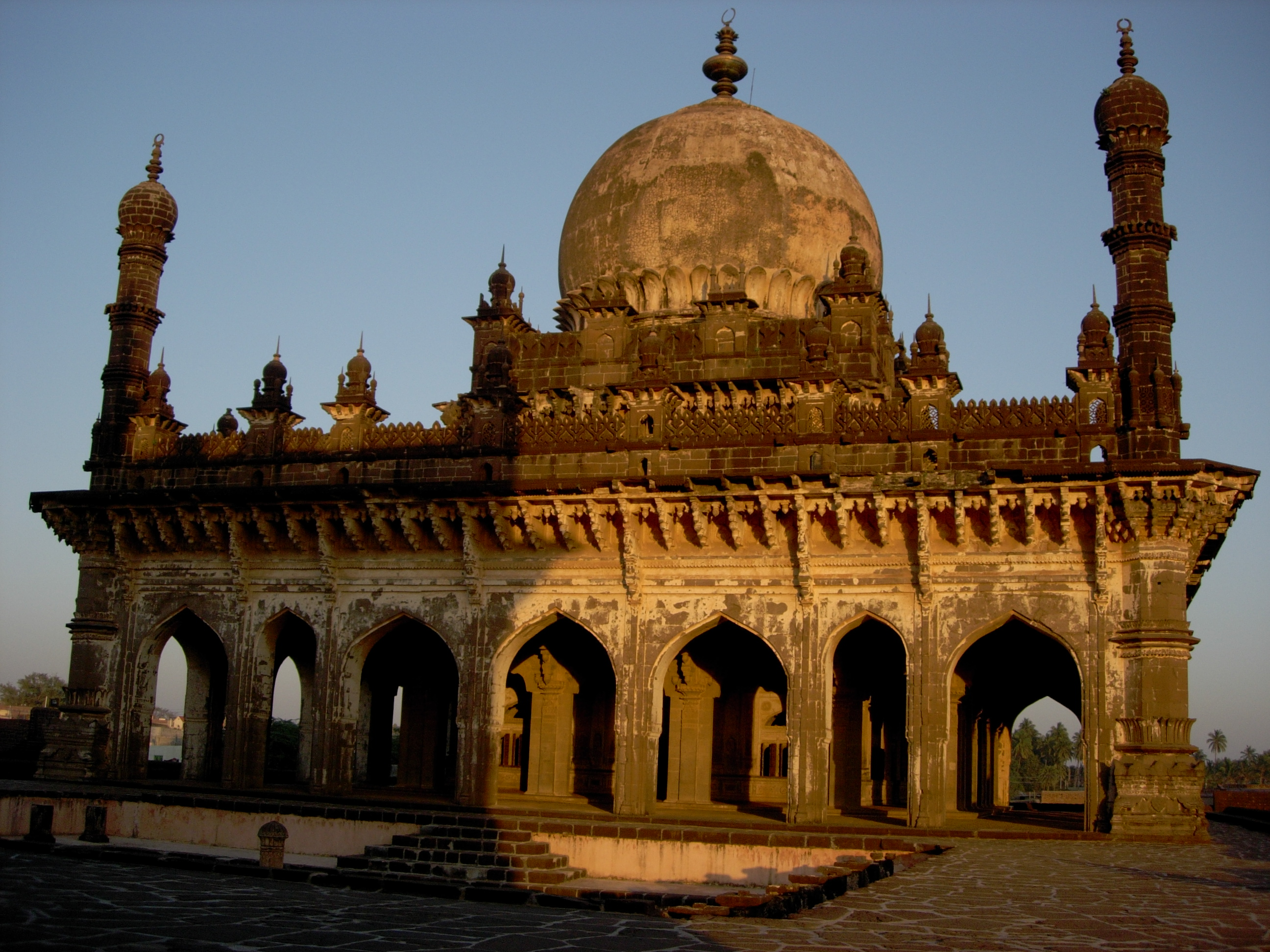
Mosque (17th century) in the mausoleum complex Ibrahim Rauza at Bijapur

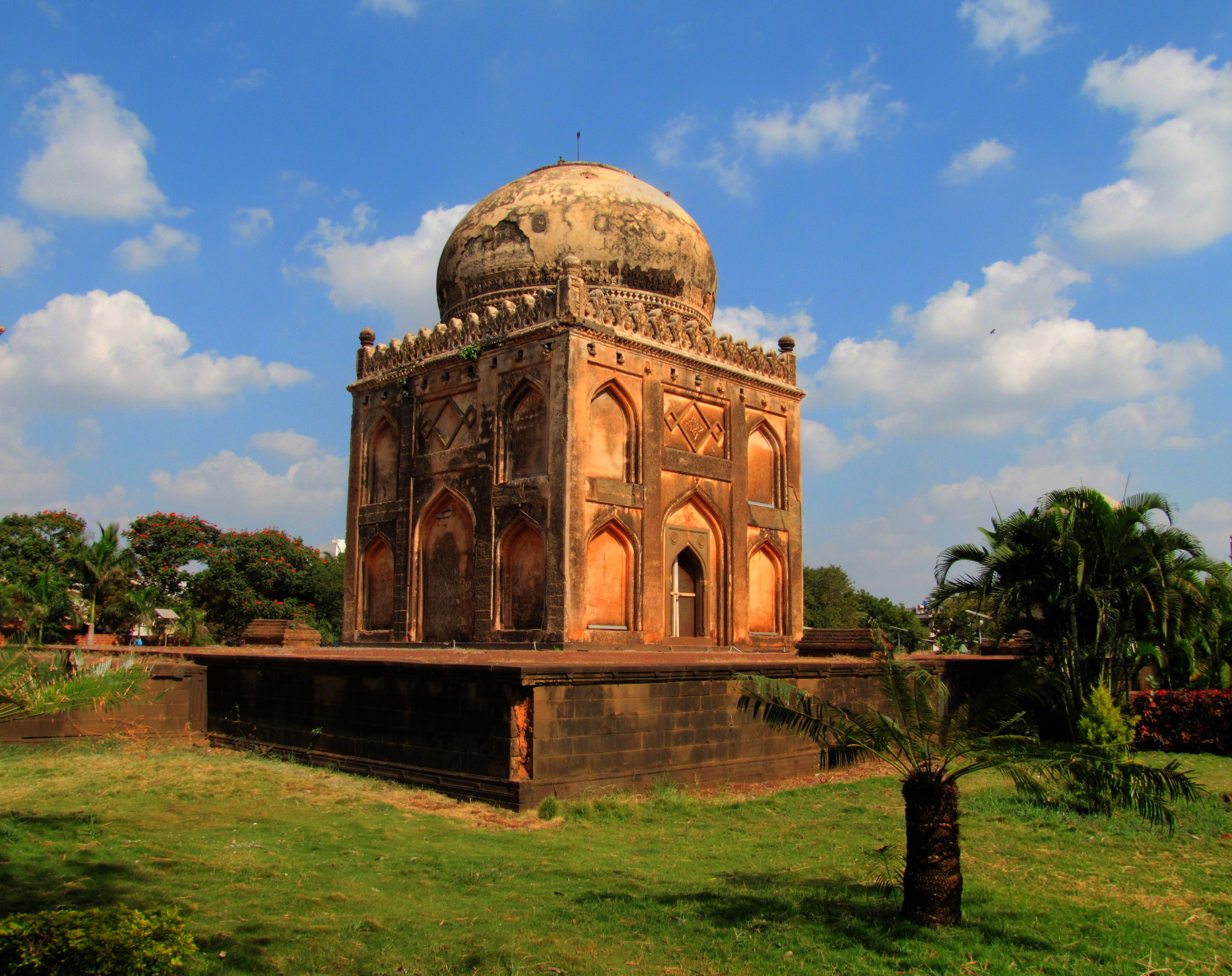
One of the Barid Shahi tombs at Bidar

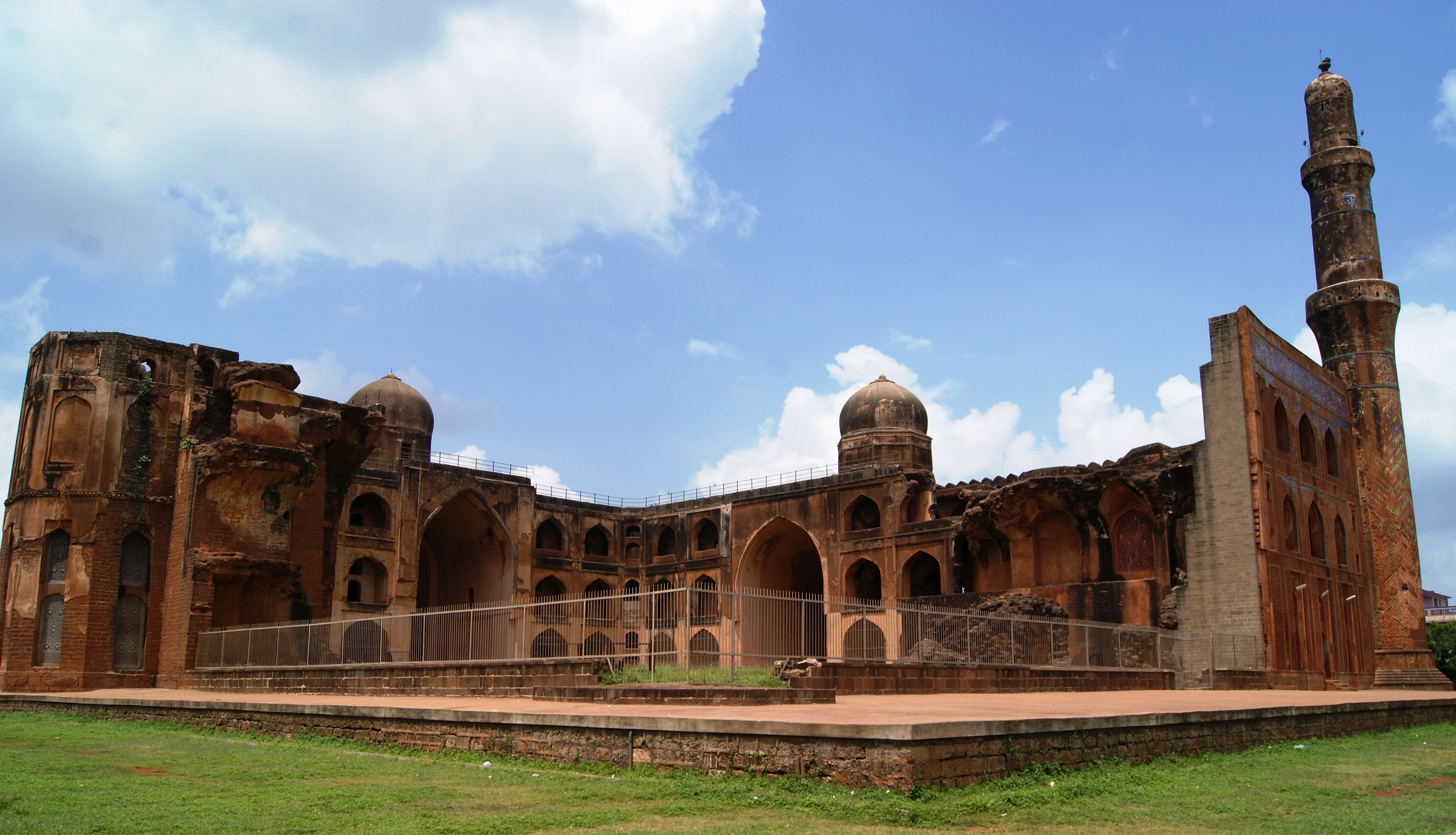
Mahmud Gawan Madrasa at Bidar, built during the 15th century by the Bahmani Sultanate

The Bahmani Sultanate ruled from its capital, Bidar from the 14th century.

=== Bahmani Sultanate ===
The Bahmani Sultanate built the Bidar Fort, and Mahmud Gawan Madrasa.

=== Deccan Sultanates ===
==== Bidar Sultanate ====
The Bidar Sultanate ruled from the former Bahmani capital of Bidar, where they made significant additions to several Bahmani buildings. The Barid Shahi tombs were built by the Bidar Sultanate.

==== Bijapur Sultanate ====
Gol Gumbaz (Kannada: ಗೋಲ ಗುಮ್ಮಟ), of Indo Islamic architectural style, is the mausoleum of Mohammed Adil Shah (1626 – 1656). at Bijapur of the Adil Shahi dynasty of Indian sultans, who ruled the Sultanate of Bijapur from 1490 to 1686. The tomb, located in the city of Bijapur was built in 1659 by the famous architect, Yaqut of Dabul. The construction of this building was completed and the deceased king was interred in this building in 1656 and contains the sepulcher containing the tombs of Muhammad Adil Shah and his wives and daughters. The structure, built of grey basalt and decorated plaster, consists of a massive square chamber measuring nearly 50 metres (160 ft) on each side and covered by a huge dome 37.9 metres (124 ft) with thickness varying from 3.05 metres (10.0 ft) near the base to 2.74 metres (9.0 ft) near the top, and has a floor area of 1,703.56 square metres (18,337.0 ft^{2}).

The acoustics of the enclosed place make it a whispering gallery where even the smallest sound is heard across the other side of the Gumbaz. Each tower consists of seven storeys, and the upper floor of each opens on to a round gallery which surrounds the dome. In the centre of the chamber is a square raised podium approached by steps in the centre of each side.

== Keladi Nayaka art of the Nayaka kingdoms ==
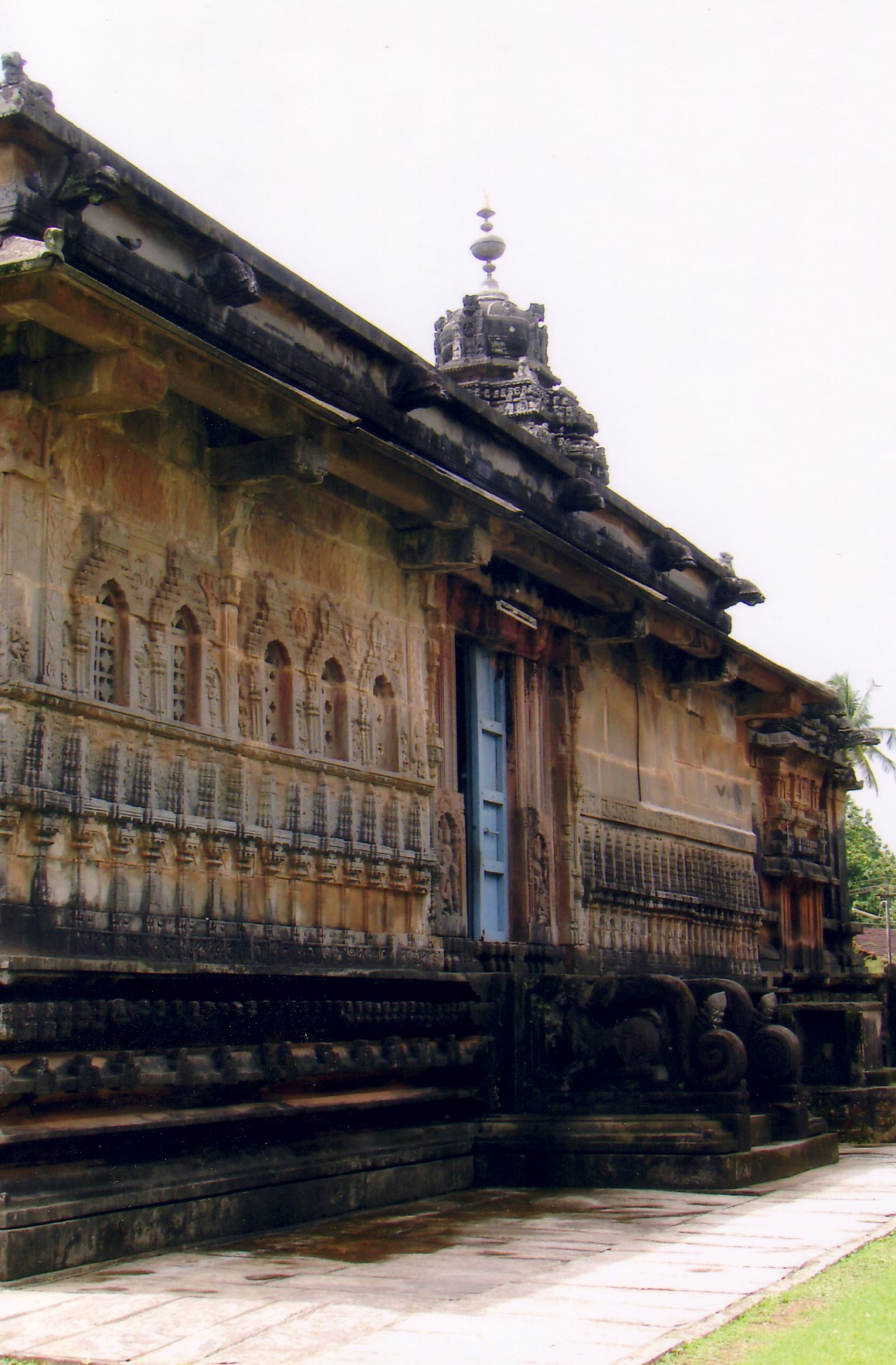
Aghoreshwara Temple, Hoysala-Kadamba style

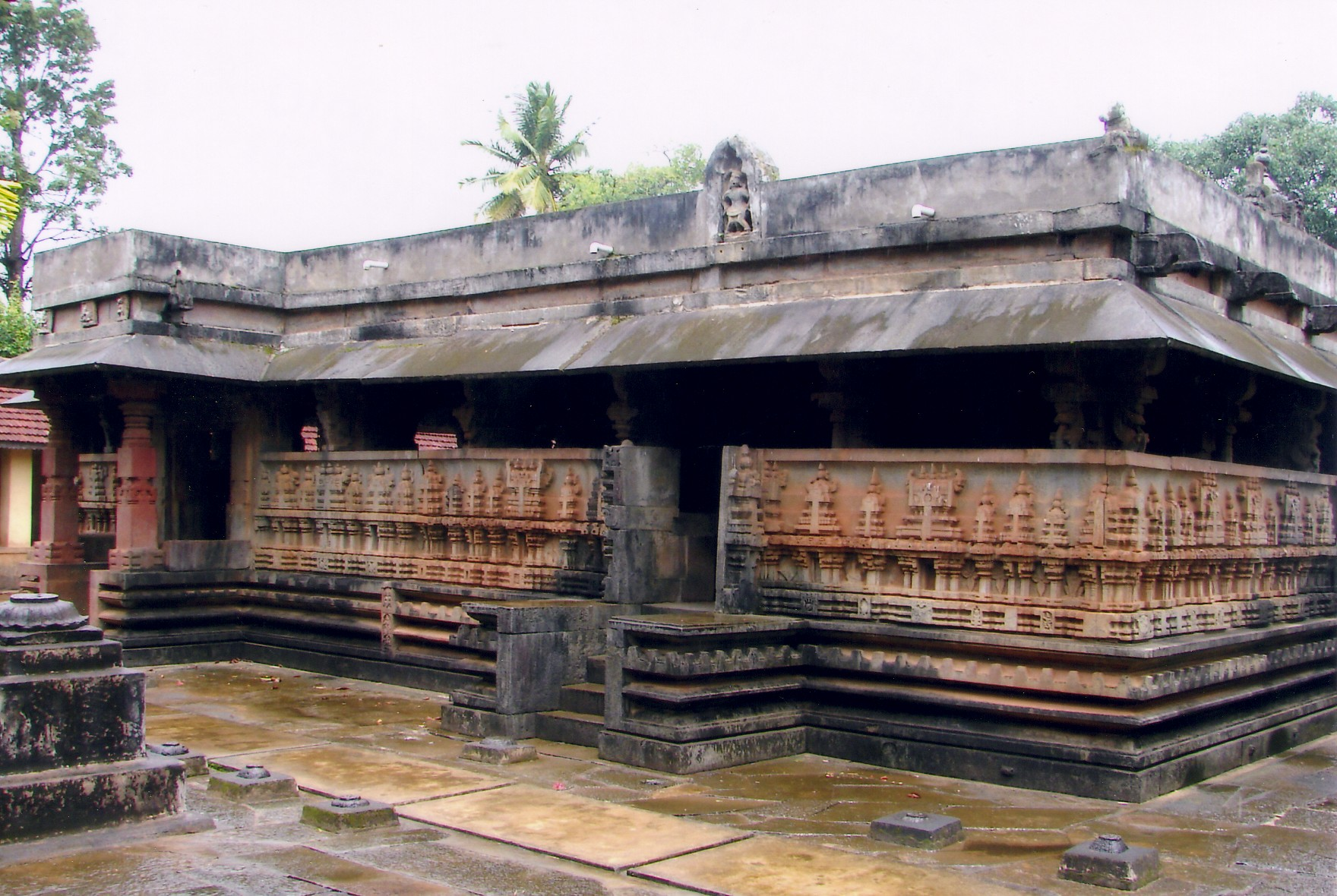
Rameshwara Temple, Hoysala-Dravida style

=== Rameshwara Temple at Keladi ===
The Keladi Nayakas (period: 1499–1763) built some fine temples in Ikkeri and Keladi using a combination of late Kadamba, Hoysala, Vijayanagara and Dravida styles. The use of granite for their construction shows that they simply followed the Vijayanagar model of architecture. The Aghoreshwara Temple at Ikkeri and the Rameshwara Temple at Keladi are the best examples of the Nayakas' art. Vijayanagar-style pillars with hippogryphs are common; called yali columns (depiction of horses and lions as seen in Hampi) is found here. These are pillars with lions, either with their forepaws raised or simply in a sitting position, and pillars with a mythical horse-like animal with front legs raised, balancing on its rear legs, and with an armed rider on its back. A roof sculpture depicting a Gandaberunda, the mythical two-headed bird of Karnataka, symbol of the state, is found in Keladi.

== Architecture of the Kingdom of Mysore ==
Architecture of Kingdom of Mysore
Blends of Hindu, Indo-Islamic Rajput and Gothic styles of architecture

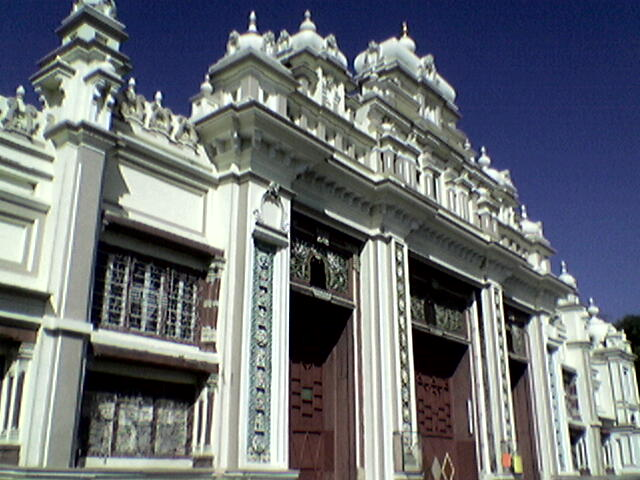
Jaganmohan Palace, Hindu style

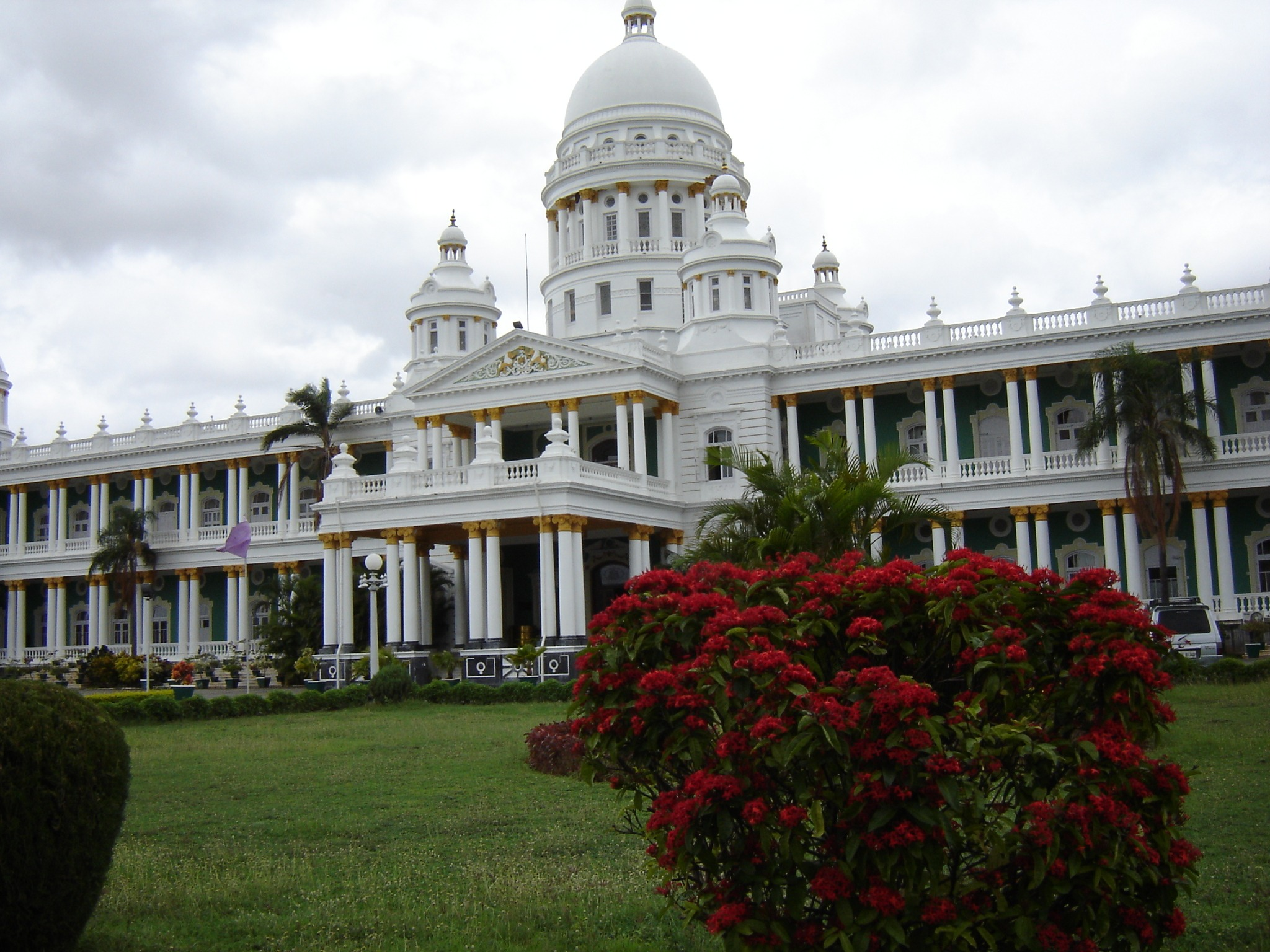
Lalitha Mahal palace, concepts from English manor houses and Italian palazzos

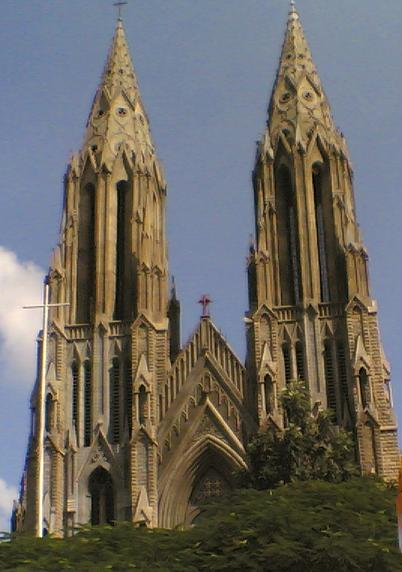
St. Philomena's Church, Neo-Gothic Cathedral architecture

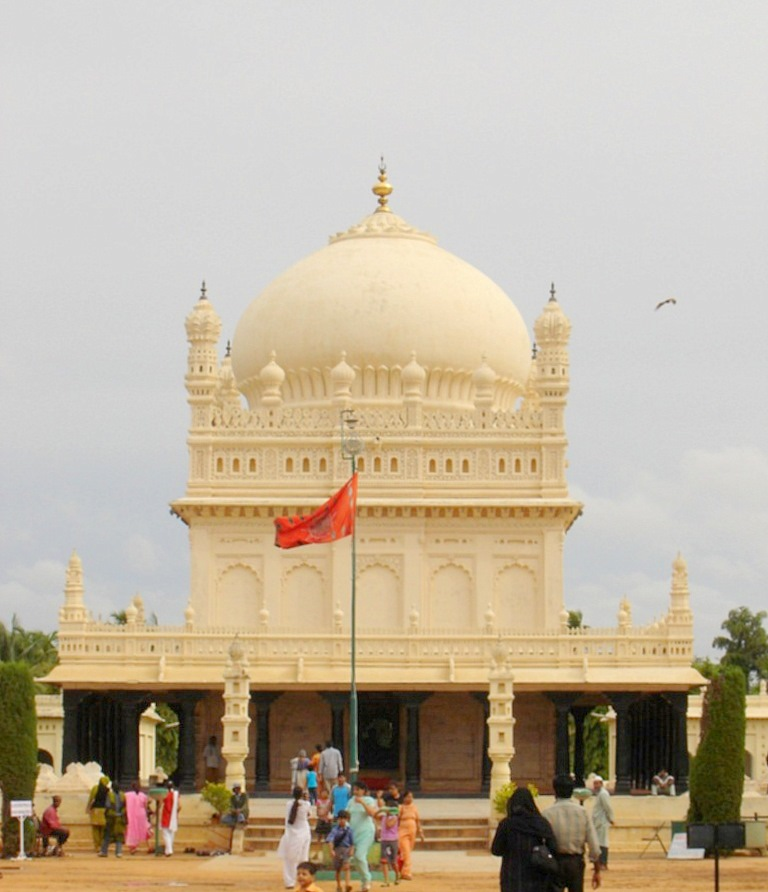
Tipu Sultan's tomb, Islamic architecture

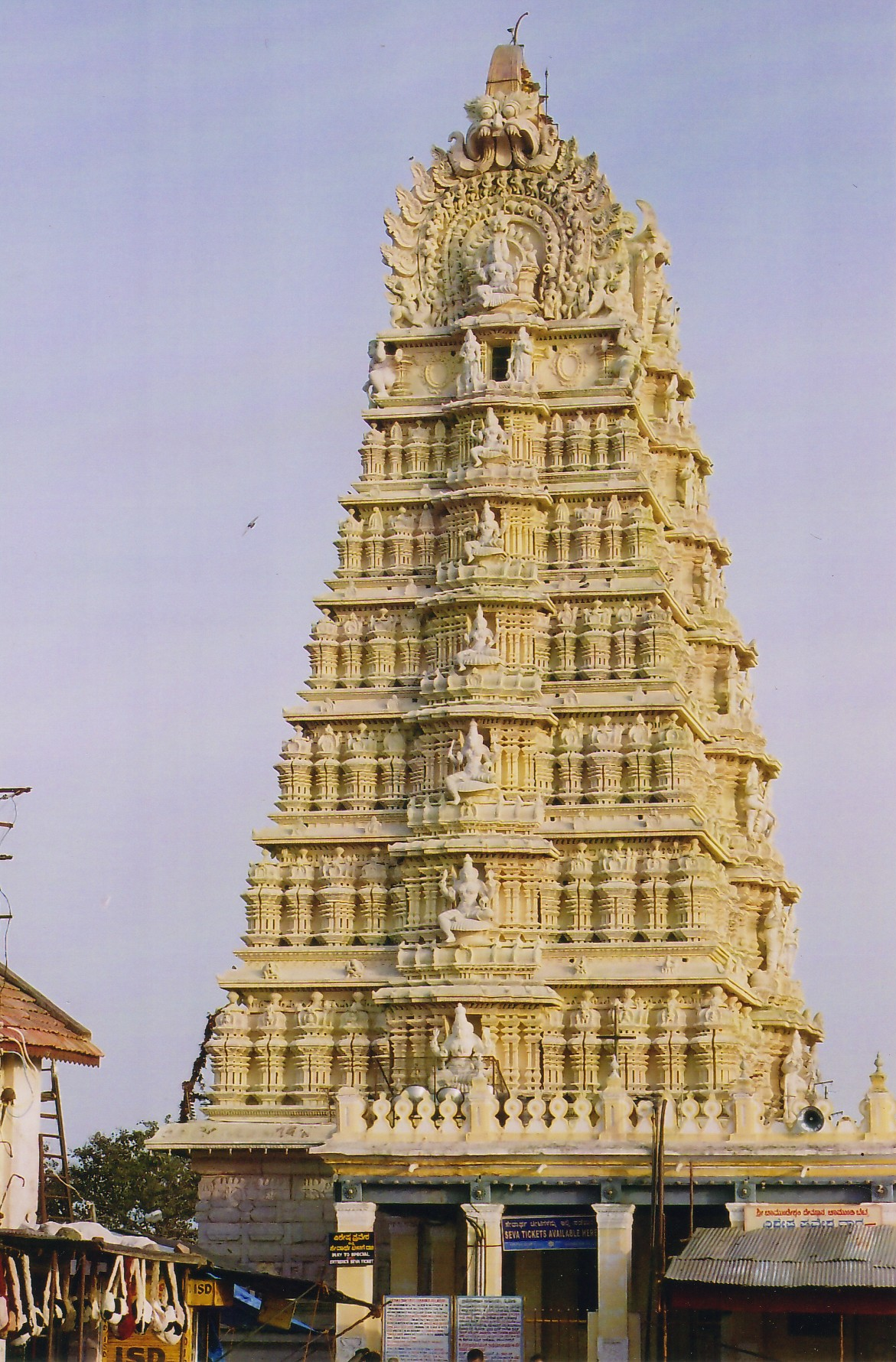
Chamundeshwari Temple, Hoysala and Vijayanagara styles

The Kingdom of Mysore was subordinate to Vijayanagara Empire until 1565 and princely state under the paramountcy of the British Raj after 1799. The architectural designs were in the Indo-Saracenic – blends of Hindu, Muslimor Islamic, Rajput, and Gothic styles of architecture under the Wodeyar Dynasty or Kingdom of Mysore from 1399 to 1947.

Indo-Saracenic type is most notably manifested in palaces and courtly buildings built in various styles, and temples built in the Dravidian style. It is the city of Mysore that is best known for its royal palaces, earning it the nickname "City of Palaces". The city's main palace, the Mysore Palace, was designed by the English architect Henry Irwin in 1897. The palace's exterior is Indo-Saracenic in style but the wealth of detail inside is distinctly of Hoysala. Domes, arches, colonnades and carved pillars, as well as its size, add to this palace's notability. The octagonal Kalyana mantapa (Marriage Hall) on the ground floor has 26 canvas paintings on its walls depicting the Dassera procession. On the first floor, a marble staircase leads to a grand colonnaded Durbar hall containing famous paintings, including one of the Hindu god Vishnu on the ceiling. The opulent Amba Vilas hall, with its carved teakwood ceiling, white marble floors, semi-precious inlay work in the Agra style, silver door with a depiction of the dashavatara and dikpalas (guardians), teak doors inlaid with ivory, Belgian stained glass, cast iron pillars from Glasgow, etched glass windows and chandeliers are worthy of mention.

The other palaces in Mysore are:

The Lalitha Mahal Palace, built in 1921 by E.W. Fritchley in the architectural style Renaissance, exhibits concepts from English manor houses and Italian palazzos, with the central dome believed to have been modelled on St. Paul's Cathedral in London.

The Jaganmohan Palace, mostly in the Hindu style built in the middle of the 19th century noted for its ornamental pavilion (called the Wedding Pavilion), and has an elegant façade with three large entrances; the Jayalakshmi Vilas Palace built in the Corinthian style consisting of a three-winged building with two Corinthian and Ionic columns; the sculptures of the Hindu goddess Lakshmi on the north side and of the goddess Bhuvaneshwari on the south side are particularly notable.

The Karanji Vilas mansion (1932), an Indo-Greek style building; the Cheluvamba Mansion (1910) – an imposing yet balanced structure, its main façade contains twin towers flanking semi-circular columned verandas on the ground and first floors.

The Maharaja's summer palace (1880), is called the Lokaranjan Mahal that initially served as a school for royalty.

The Rajendra Vilas Palace (1938) is built in the Indo-British style atop the Chamundi Hill.

Other royal mansions built by the Mysore rulers were the Chittaranjan Mahal in Mysore and the Bangalore Palace in Bangalore, a structure built on the lines of England's Windsor Castle.

Surrounding the main palace in Mysore and inside the fort are five temples, built in various periods namely, the Prasanna Krishnaswamy Temple (1829), the Lakshmiramana Swamy Temple, the oldest of the fort temples (existed prior to 1499); the Trinesvara Swamy Temple, built for the three-eyed god Shiva, existed since the time of King Raja Wodeyar and was renovated by successive kings; the Shweta Varaha Swamy Temple is unique in that it contains many aspects of Hoysala architecture; and the Prasanna Venkataramana Swami Temple, a Vishnu temple containing 12 murals of the Wodeyar rulers, built by Subbaraya Dasa, an officer of Maharaja Krishnaraja Wodeyar III, in 1836.

=== Chamundeshwari Temple ===
Chamundeshwari Temple, famous among the kingdom's temples, is located atop the Chamundi Hills about 13 kilometres (8.1 mi) from the palace city of Mysore, over a climb of 1000 steps. The original shrine is said to have been built in the 12th century by Hoysala rulers while its tower was probably built by the Vijayanagar rulers and Wodeyars of Mysore. The temple has a seven-story-tall gopuram or tower built in 1827 decorated with intricate carvings. The idol of the Chamundeshwari or Durga, the fierce form of Shakthi, is called the Goddess of Mysore as it was the tutelary deity of the Mysore Maharajas. It is said to be made of solid gold and the temple gates are made of silver. There is a huge granite Nandi (bull) on the 800th step on the hill in front of a small Shiva temple, a short distance away. This Nandi is over 4.63 metres (15.2 ft) high, and 7.41 metres (24.3 ft) long and around its neck are exquisite bells.

=== Neo-Gothic architecture ===
The Shettihalli Rosary Church near Shettihalli, an example of French colonial Gothic architecture, built in 1860, is a rare example of a Christian ruin. After a century, the construction of the dam on the Hemavati River left it flooded every monsoon season, a popular sight for tourists.

St. Philomena's Cathedral in Mysore was built between 1933 and 1956 in honour of St. Philomena. It was constructed using a Neo-Gothic style and its architecture designed by a Frenchman by name Daly was inspired by the Cologne Cathedral in Germany. A history of St. Philomena's church is provided by Saint Philomena, a saint and martyr of the Roman Catholic Church, is said to have been a young Greek princess martyred in the 4th century. A relic of the saint from Peter Pisani, Apostolic Delegate of the East Indies was handed over to Father Cochet who approached the Mysore king to assist him in constructing a church in honour of St. Philomena. The Maharaja of Mysore laid the foundation stone of the church on 28 October 1933. In his speech on the day of the inauguration, the Maharaja is quoted to have said: "The new church will be strongly and securely built upon a double foundation – divine compassion and the eager gratitude of men." The construction of the church was completed under Bishop Rene Fuga's supervision. The relic of Saint Philomena is preserved in a catacomb below the main altar.

The floor plan of the cathedral resembles a cross. The long part of the Cross is the congregation hall called the nave. The two arms of the cross are the transepts. The part containing the altar and the choir is the crossing. The cathedral has a crypt that houses a statue of St. Philomena. The Church has a length of about 50 metres (160 ft) and has twin spires that are 50 metres (160 ft) in height and they resemble the spires of the Cologne Cathedral and also the spires of the St. Patrick's Church in New York City.

=== Muslim Architecture – Tipu Sultan's rule ===
The Masjid-e-Ala or Jama Masjid was built by Tipu Sultan in 1784 and has minarets mounted on a tall platform. It has two storeys and is octagonal in shape with pigeonholes surmounted by domes. The walls and ceilings are decorated with Persian scriptures in fine calligraphy.

=== Indo-Saracenic architecture ===
Tipu Sultan built the Dariya Daulat Palace in the Dariya Daulat Bhag (literally the "garden of the wealth of the sea") in 1784. Built in the Indo-Saracenic style, the palace is known for its intricate woodwork and paintings. The west wall of the palace is covered with murals depicting Tipu Sultan's victory over Colonel Baillie's army at the Pollilur, near Kanchipuram in 1780.

== Sikh architecture ==
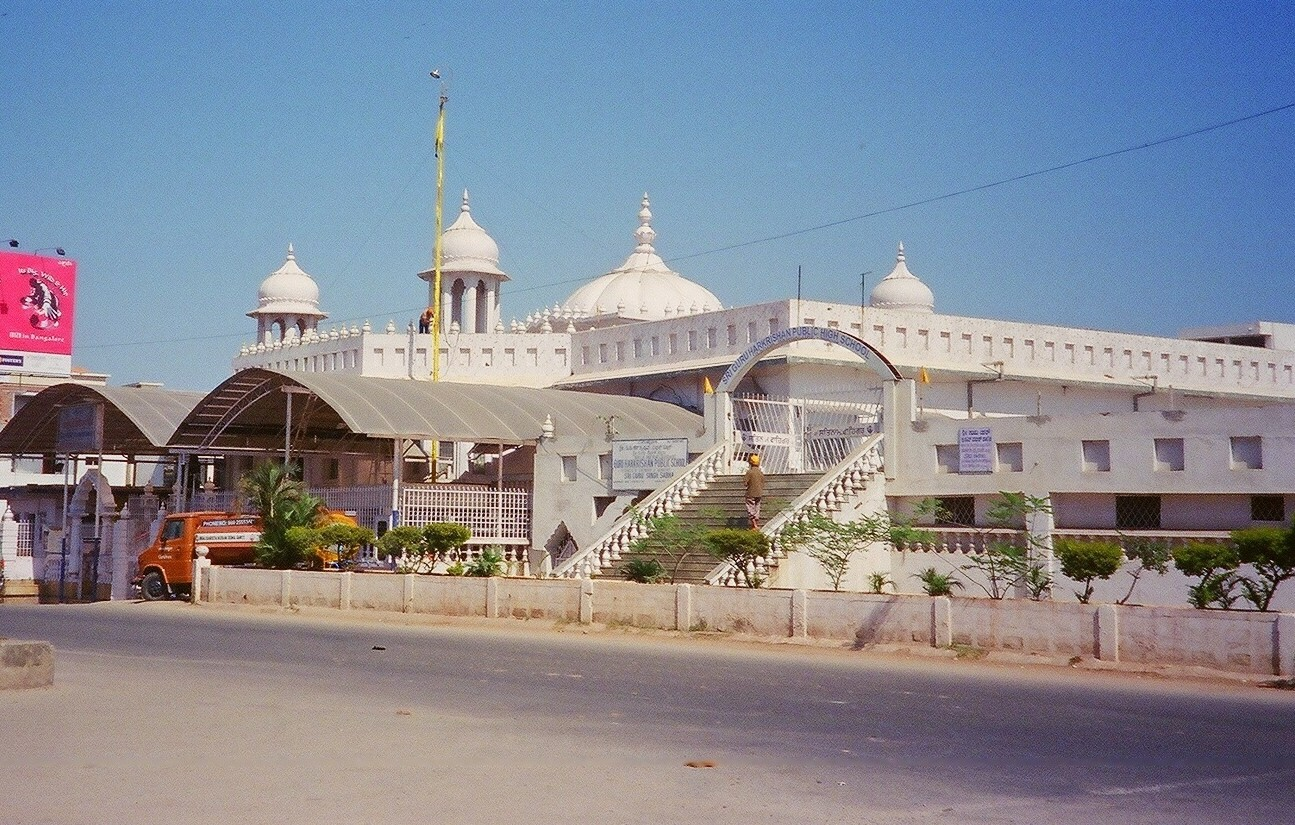
Gurudwara on the bank of Ulsoor lake in Bangalore

The earliest Sikh Gurudwara in Karnataka is the Guru Nanak Jhira Sahib at Bidar. It was built in traditional Sikh architecture style, at a sacred place located at Bidar in Bidar District. It is also called Nanak Jhira, where Jhira means a spring of water exists. Legend says that Guru Nanak halted here on his way to Sri Lanka in 1512. During that period, people of Bidar were suffering from shortage of drinking water. A fountain of cool water rose out from a hill by the spiritual power of Guru Nanak. A committee took up development work of Gurudwara Nanak Jhira Sahib with the central three-storey building completed in 1966, which encases the historic Nanak Jhira spring divined by Gurunanak. The water of the fountain is collected in 'Amrit-Khud' (a tank of potion), built in white marble. There is a Sikh museum, built in the memory of Guru Tegh Bahadur, depicting the important events of Sikh history through pictures and paintings. There is a Sikh museum, built in the memory of Guru Tegh Bahadur, depicting the important events of Sikh history through pictures and paintings. Built in the Sikh architecture style, the Gurdwara is a lively blend of the Mughal and Rajput styles. Onion-shaped domes, multi-foil arches, paired pilasters, in-lay work, frescoes, etc. are of Mughal extraction, more specially of Shah Jahan's period, while oriel windows, bracket supported eaves at the string-course, chattris, richly ornamented friezes, etc., are derived from elements of Rajput architecture such as is seen in Jaipur, Jodhpur, Bikaner and other places in Rajasthan.

Apart from the above ancient Gurudwara at Bidar, Bangalore city also has Gurudwaras dated to the 20th century. Guru Nanak, the Sikh Guru, was the first Sikh to visit Bengaluru. On his way back from Sri Lanka he halted at Bangalore. Kempegowda, the builder of Bangalore, met him and sought his blessings. Gurunanak not only blessed Kempegowda but also told him to develop the place. But it took many more years for a Sikh Gurudwara to be built in Bangalore. There are now three Gurudwaras in Bangalore. The first Sikh Gurudwara and the largest in Bangalore near the Ulsoor Lake on the Kensington Road, is an elegant and white structure, which was opened on 13 April 1946. It has been renovated recently with marble floors.

== Buddhist culture & architecture ==
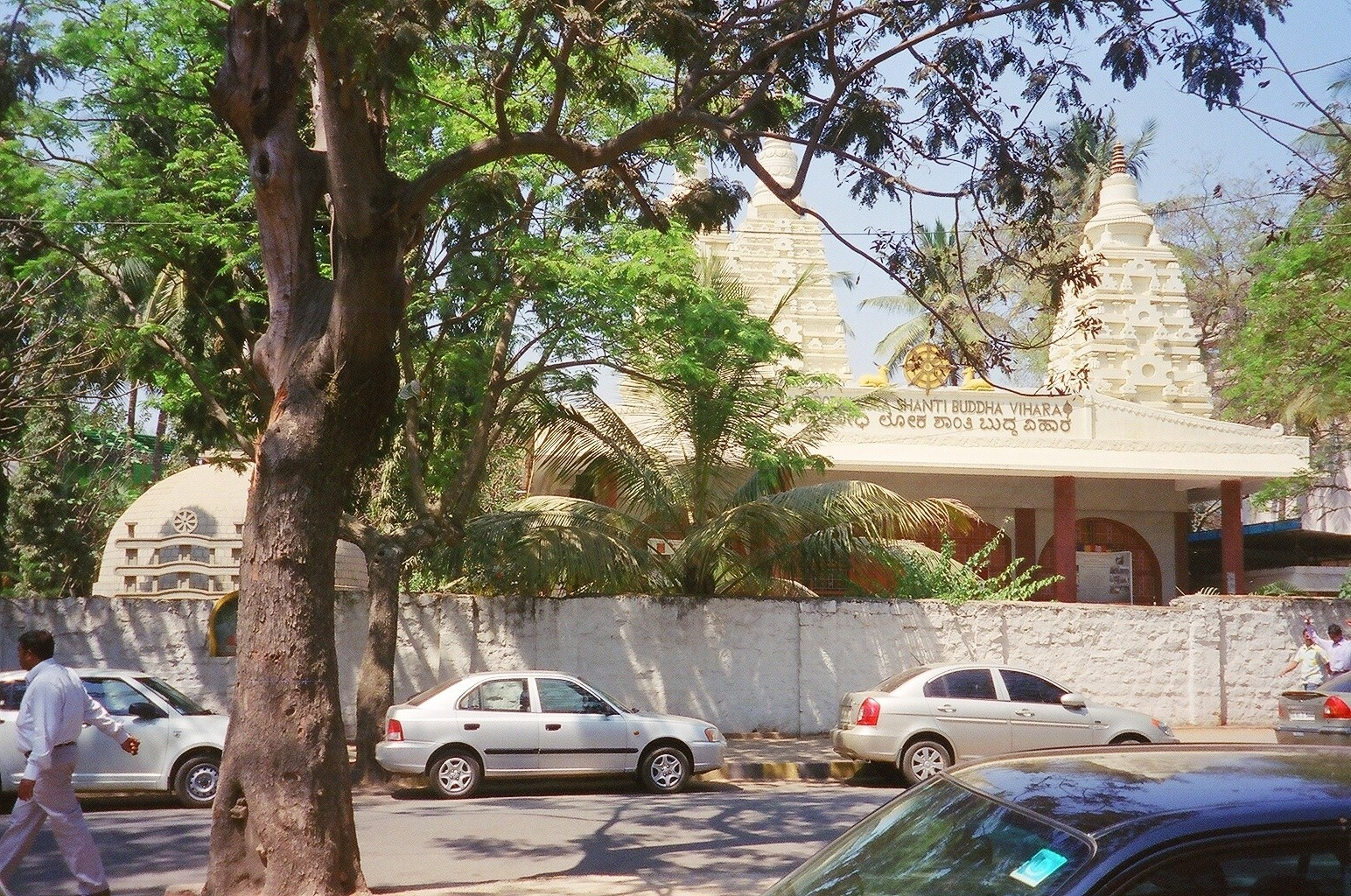
A view of Buddha Vihara in Bangalore

While under the Mauryas and Satavahanas Buddhism prospered in Karnataka, the influence of Hinduism expanded as it subsumed most of the teachings of Buddha and Buddhism and thus Buddhism lost its distinct uniqueness in the state. However, in the 20th century, Buddha viharas have been established in the State with Bangalore recording two such viharas.

The Maha Bodhi Society (MBS) was established by Acharya Buddharakkhita in 1956 at Bangalore with the objective of propagating the teachings of the Buddha and to provide the inspiration and facilities for putting that teaching into practice through spiritual, social, educational activities. The first act of the Acharya was to plant a sampling of the holy Bodhi tree from Bodh Gaya at the premises of the proposed Society. This tree has grown with the Society and is venerated. The Maha Bodhi Society Temple, a relatively new structure, was then built with the main shrine replicating the historic tower at Bodh Gaya. Temple as built is a brick structure with a central tower of 55 m (180.4 ft) height. The Stupa that represents a basic factor in the teaching of the Buddha has also been built at the entrance to the temple, which is made of granite and it enshrines a relic of the Buddha. The temple, the stupa and the Bodhi tree in the temple complex now form a unique landmark in Bangalore. It is a place of worship and meditation, a centre of pilgrimage for people from all over India and other countries.

Tibetan Culture & Tibetan architecture in Karnataka

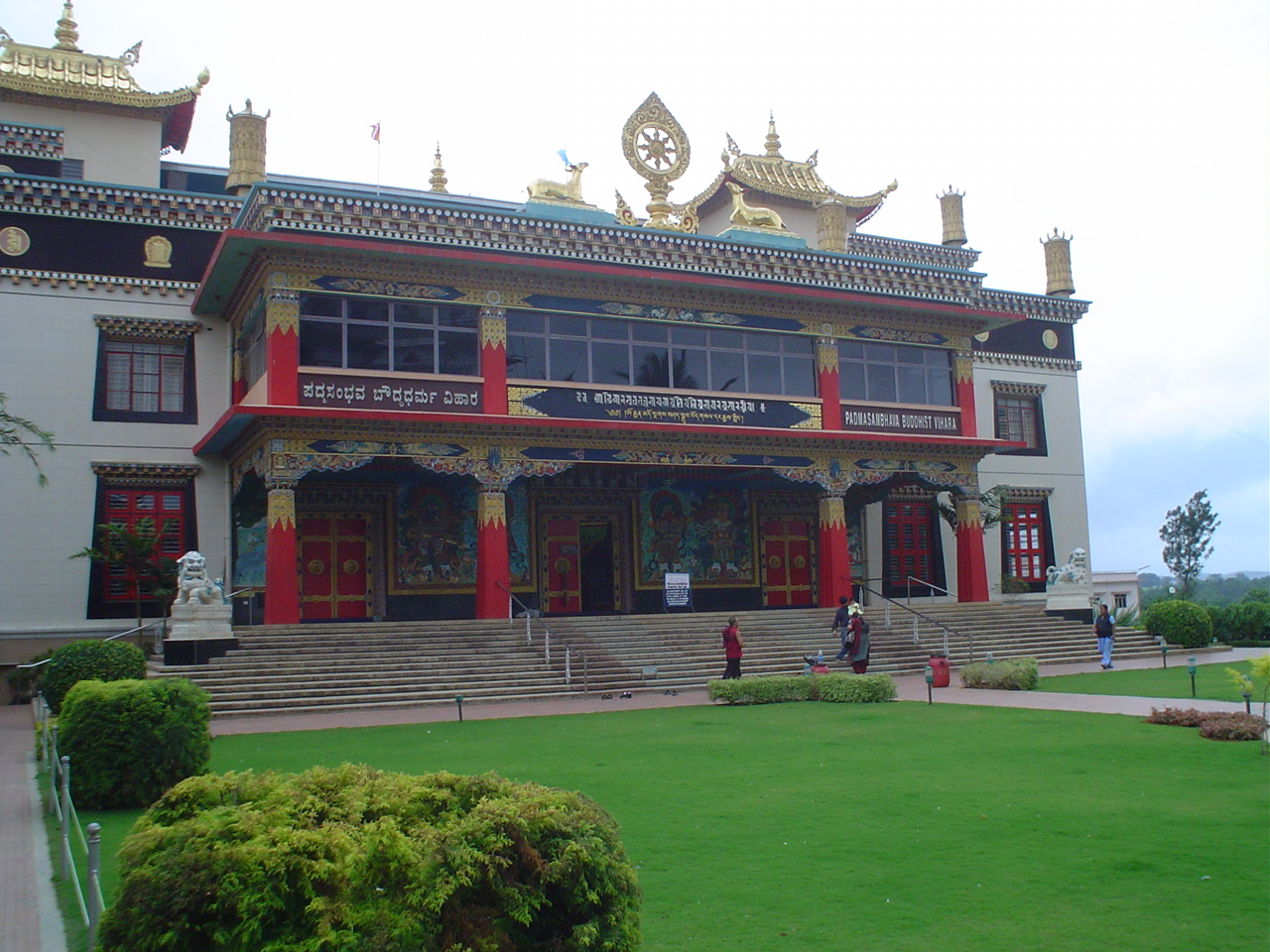
Outside view of Buddhist Golden Temple

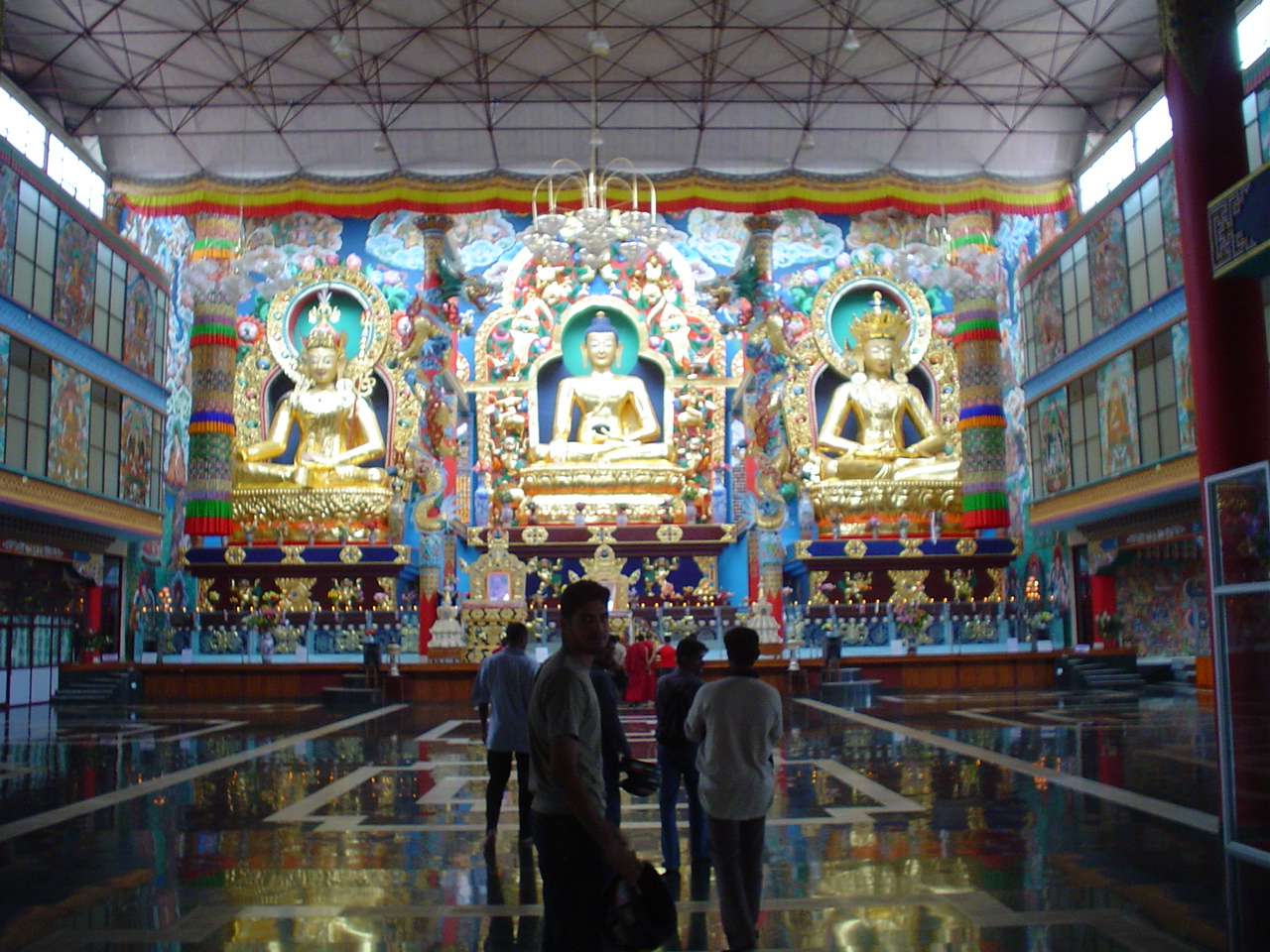
Inside the Golden Temple

=== Tibetan Buddhist culture & architecture ===
Apart from the Indian Buddhist traditions in the form of Viharas seen in various parts of the country, Tibetan Buddhist monasteries have also made a lasting impact in Karnataka with the influx of refugees from Tibet who were settled in Bylakuppe. One of the famous monasteries is the Namdroling monastery, built as per traditional Tibetan architecture, which is located in Bylakuppe near Kushalnagar in Kodagu in Karnataka. This spectacular Tibetan Golden Temple is a major tourist spot in the area. It is termed the 'Charming mini Tibet near Madikeri’. Tibetan refugees have both recreated their lifestyle as well as adapted to the local conditions around the monasteries. Huge golden statues, bright coloured wall paintings all around, gigantic dragons on the pillars in a high and big hall are a sight to behold.

A lineage of Tibetan Buddhism in the world, the monastery is home to a sangha community of over five thousand lamas (both monks and nuns), a religious college (or shedra) and hospital. The monastery was established by Penor Rinpoche (construction started in 1963 and inaugurated in 1999).

Built in typical Tibetan architecture style with Chinese and Indian influences, the monastery reflects a deeply Buddhist approach. It has the Buddhist mandatory Prayer wheel, along with two deer or dragons, same as can be seen on nearly every Gompa in Tibet. Tibetan art, a form of sacred art, in the form of the exquisitely detailed statues to wooden carvings to the intricate designs of the Thangka paintings (a syncretism of Chinese scroll-painting with Nepalese and Kashmiri painting) are seen in this monastery.

== Neo Dravidian architecture ==
Neo Dravidian architecture, Karnataka

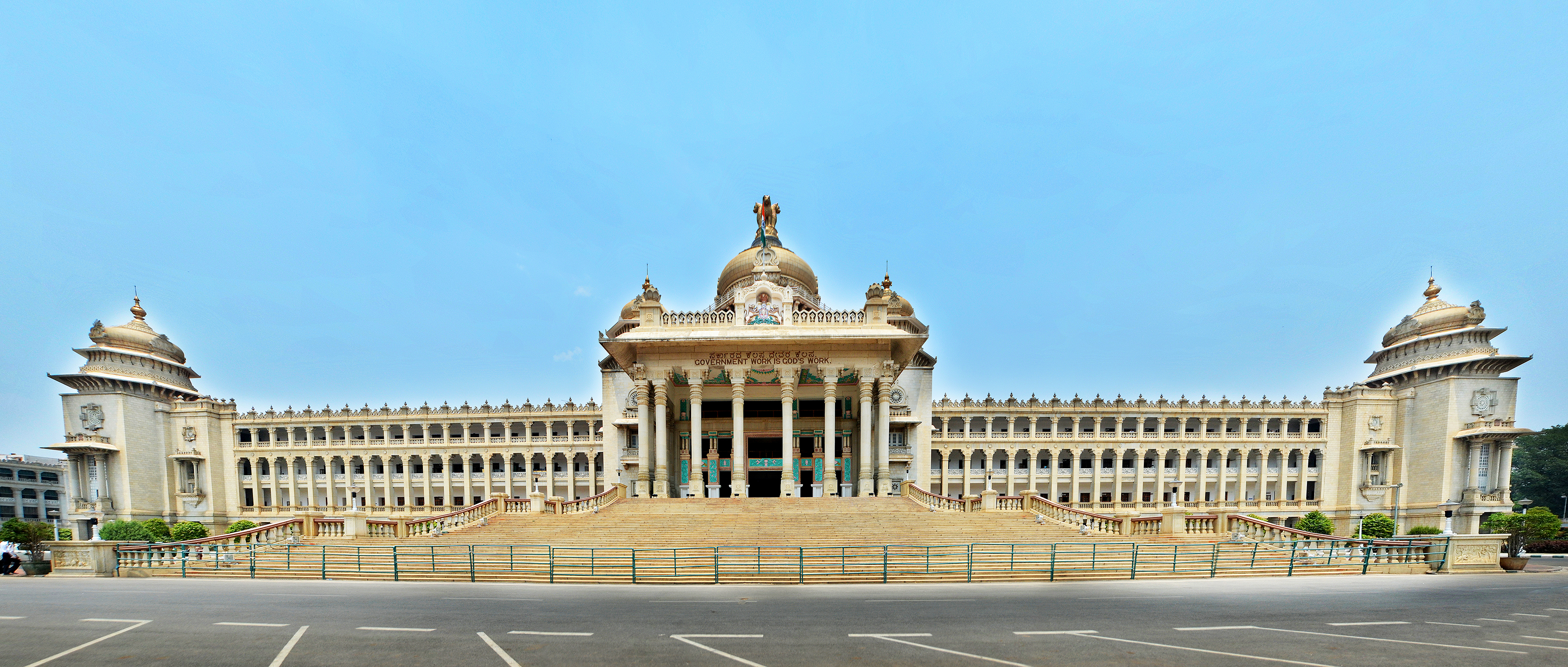
The Vidhana Soudha is the seat of Karnataka's Legislative assembly

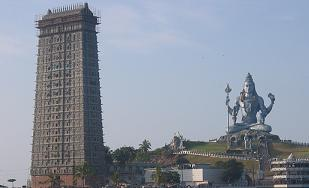
Gopura of Murudeshwara Temple and statue of Shiva

In the post independence period (1947 to present) several architectural monuments, in a blend of modern and Dravidian architecture have been built in Karnataka; two structures are the Vidhana Soudha and Murudeshwara Temple.

=== Vidhana Soudha ===
Vidhana Soudha is an imposing building, constructed in a style sometimes described as 'Neo-Dravidian', and incorporates elements of Indo-Saracenic, Rajasthani Jharokha and Dravidian styles. It was completed in 1956. Kengal Hanumanthaiah, the then Chief Minister of Karnataka, took a lot of interest and effort in building this marvellous granite building. It is also called as Taj Mahal of South India.

=== Murudeshwara Temple ===
The Murudeshwara Temple, built on the Kanduka hill, is surrounded on three sides by the waters of the Arabian Sea. It is a temple dedicated to the Shiva with a 20-storied Gopura 76.85 metres (252.1 ft), considered as the tallest temple of the 21st century. Two life-size elephants in concrete stand guard at the steps leading to the temple. A huge towering statue of Shiva, visible from great distances, is present in the temple complex. Newly constructed Shiva's statue is next to Murudeshwar statue. The statue is 37 metres (121 ft) in height.

== Gallery ==
Typical architectural styles seen in Karnataka are shown in this gallery.

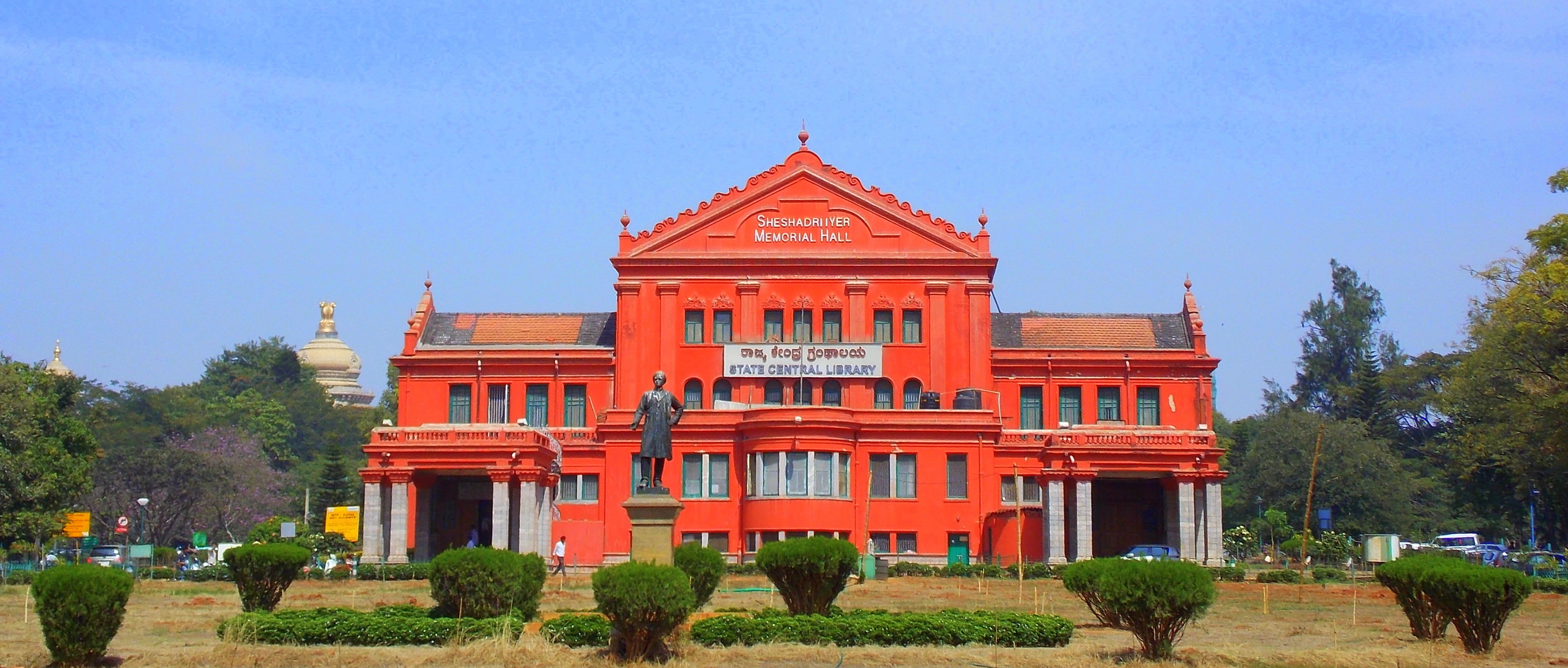
Seshadri Iyer Memorial Library in Cubbon Park

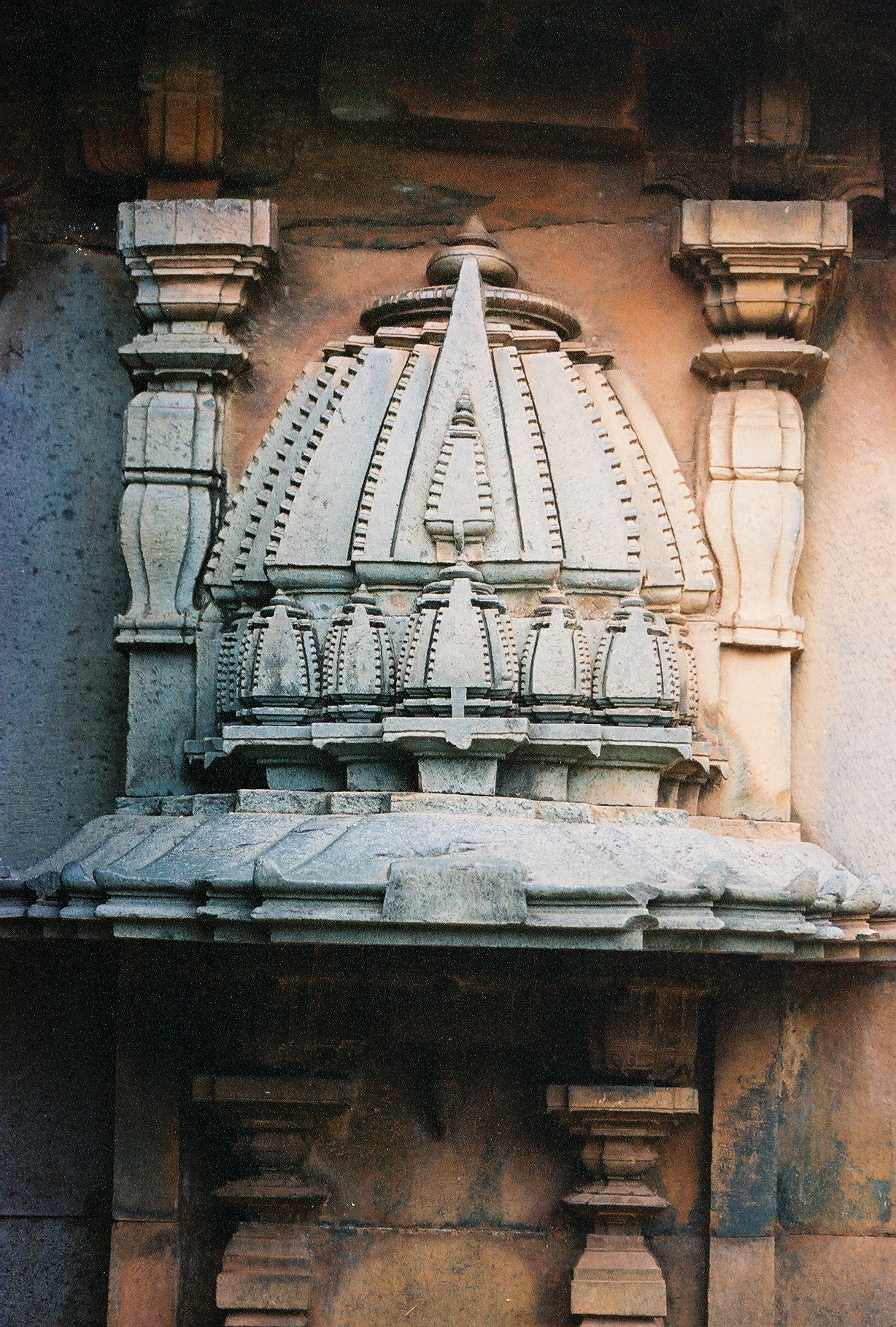
Nagara style tower

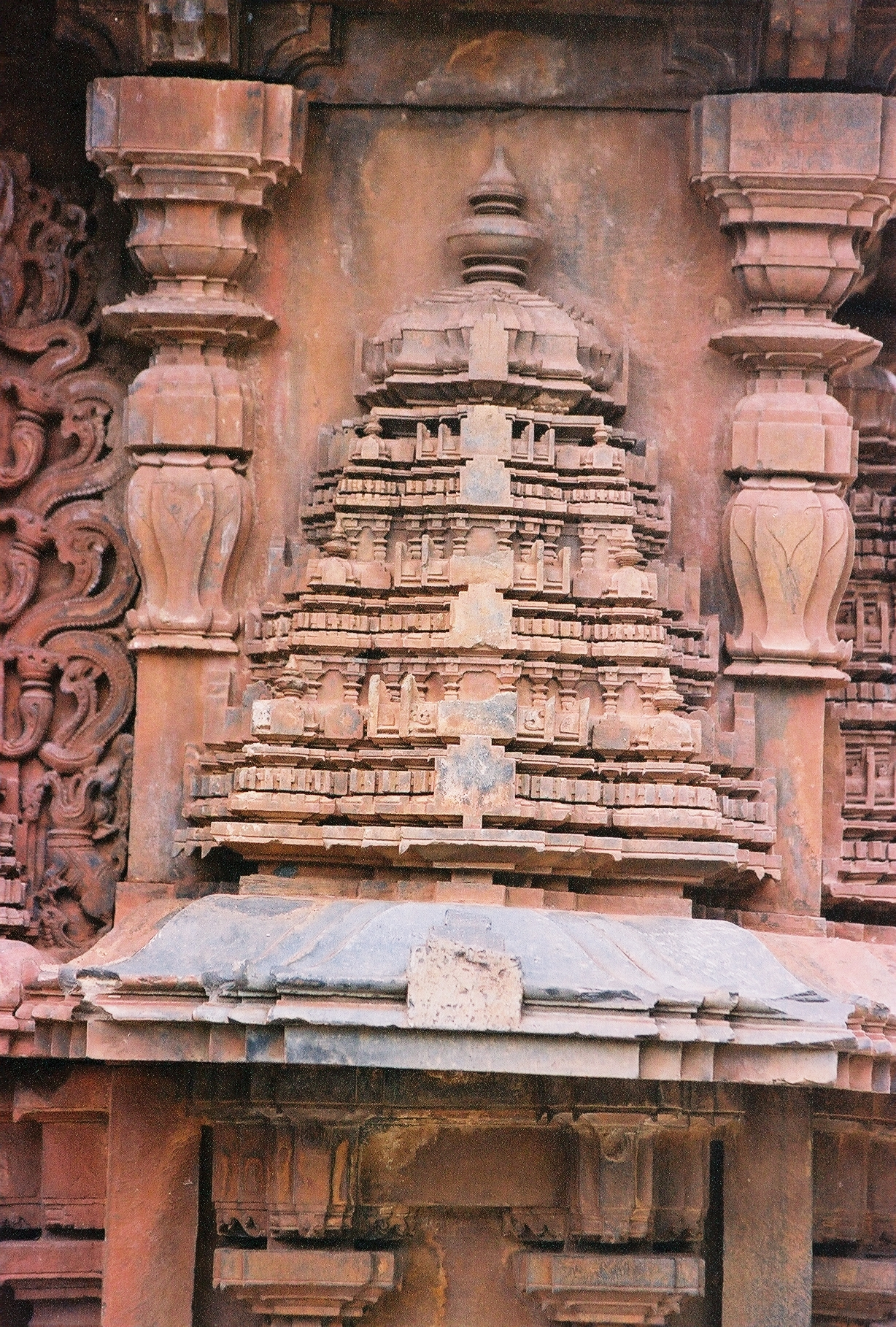
South Indian Dravida style tower

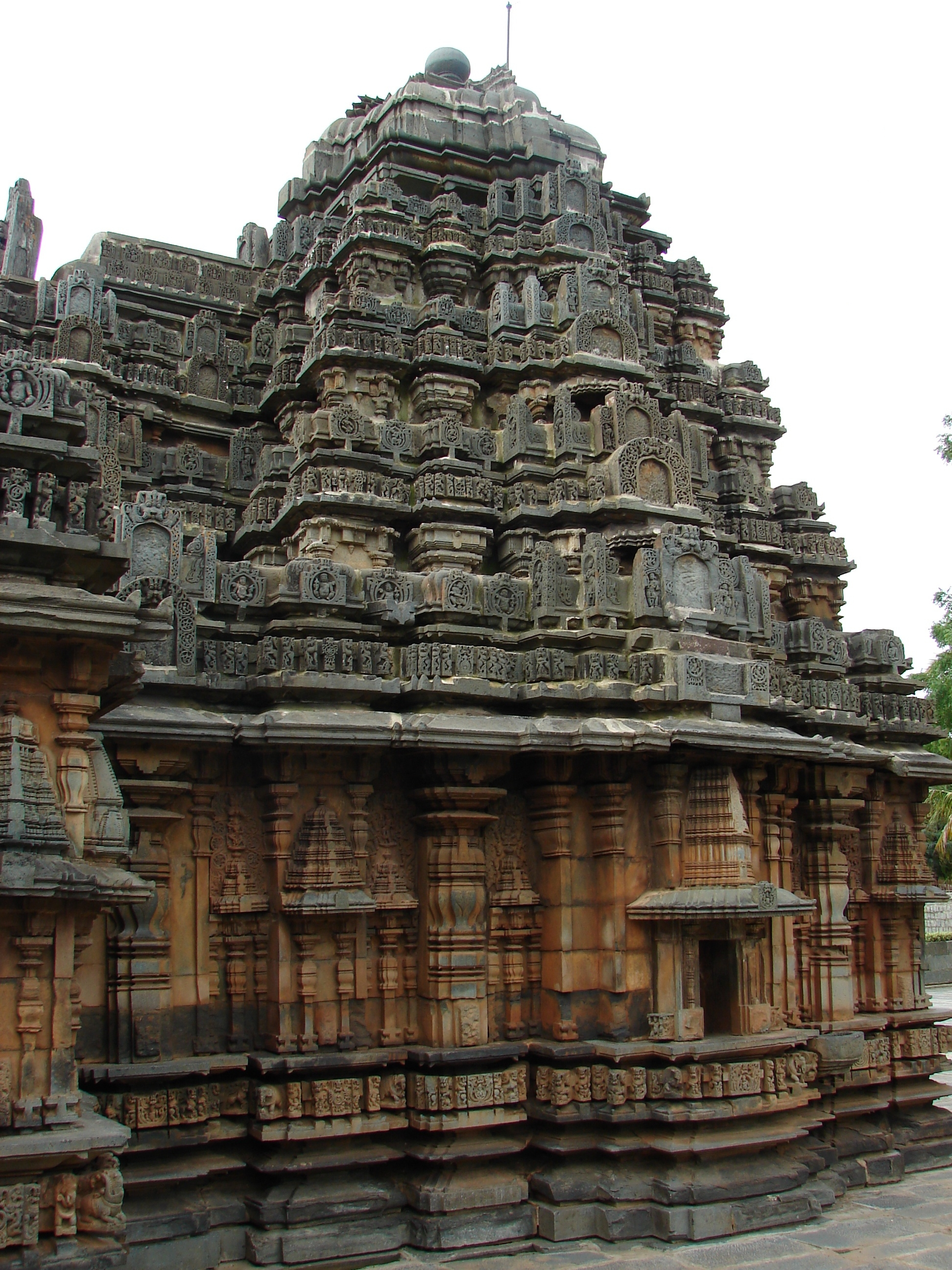
Dravida articulation and superstructure

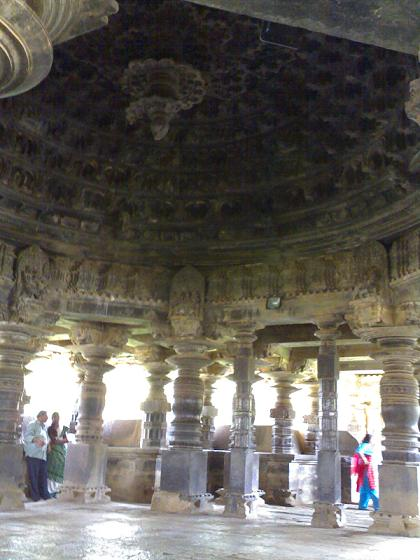
Mantapa structure

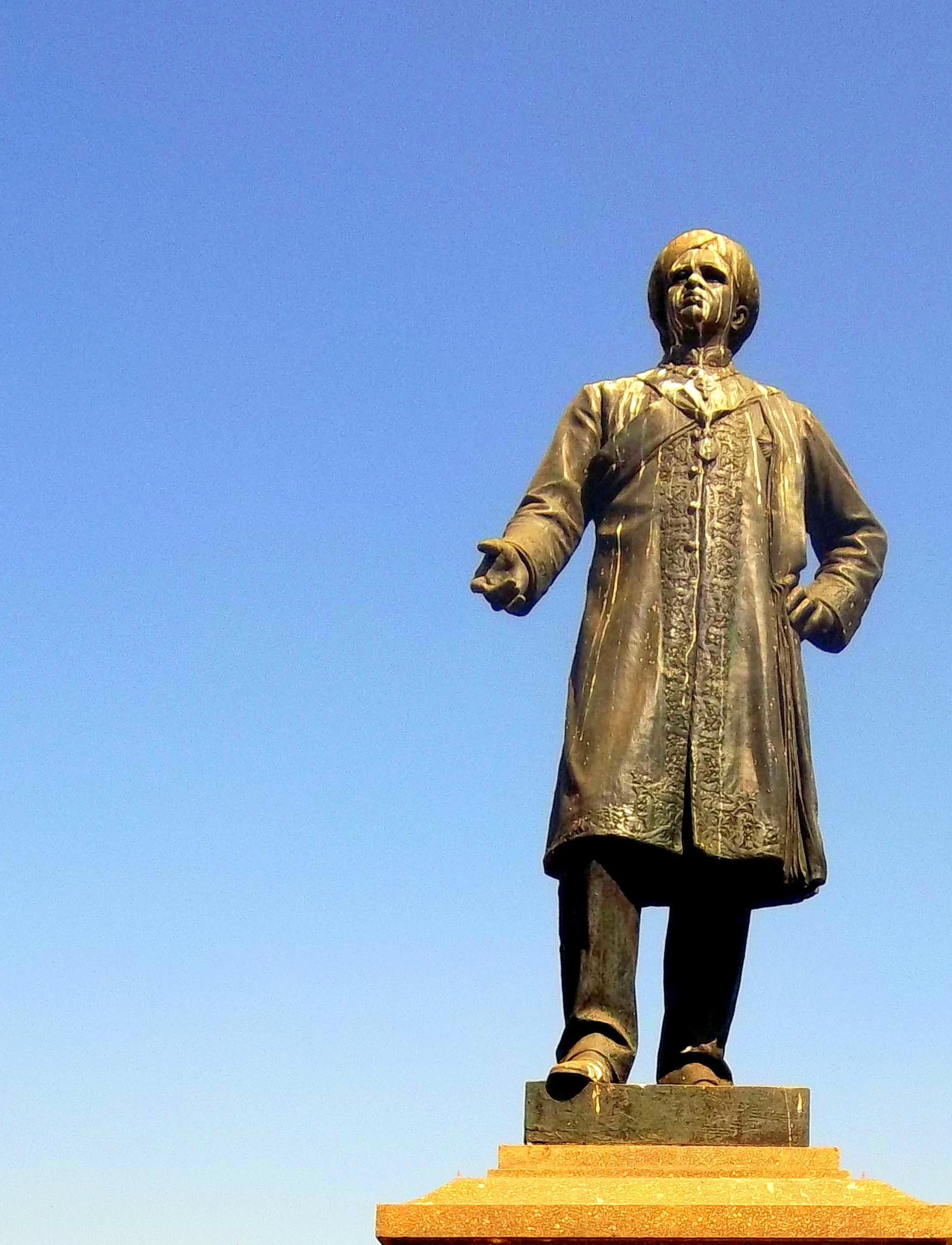
Statue of K.Sheshadri Iyer at Cubbon Park

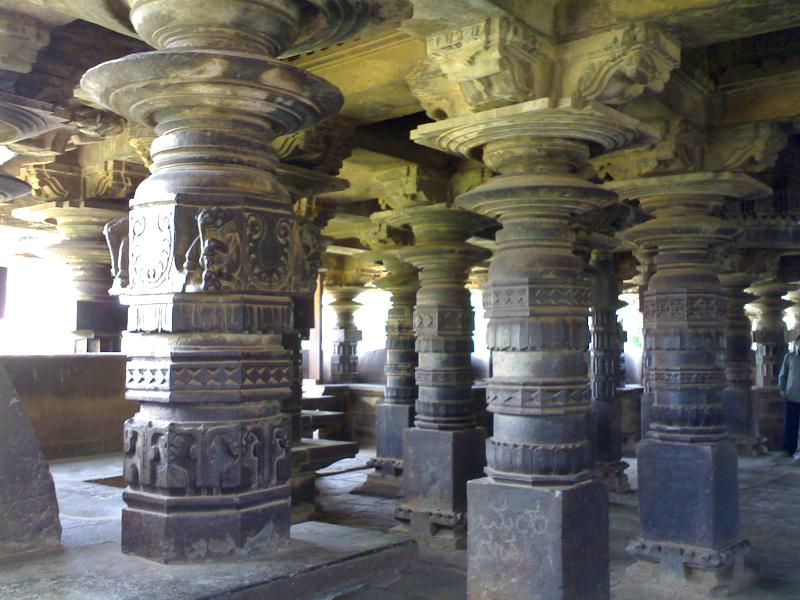
Polished and like lath turned pillars

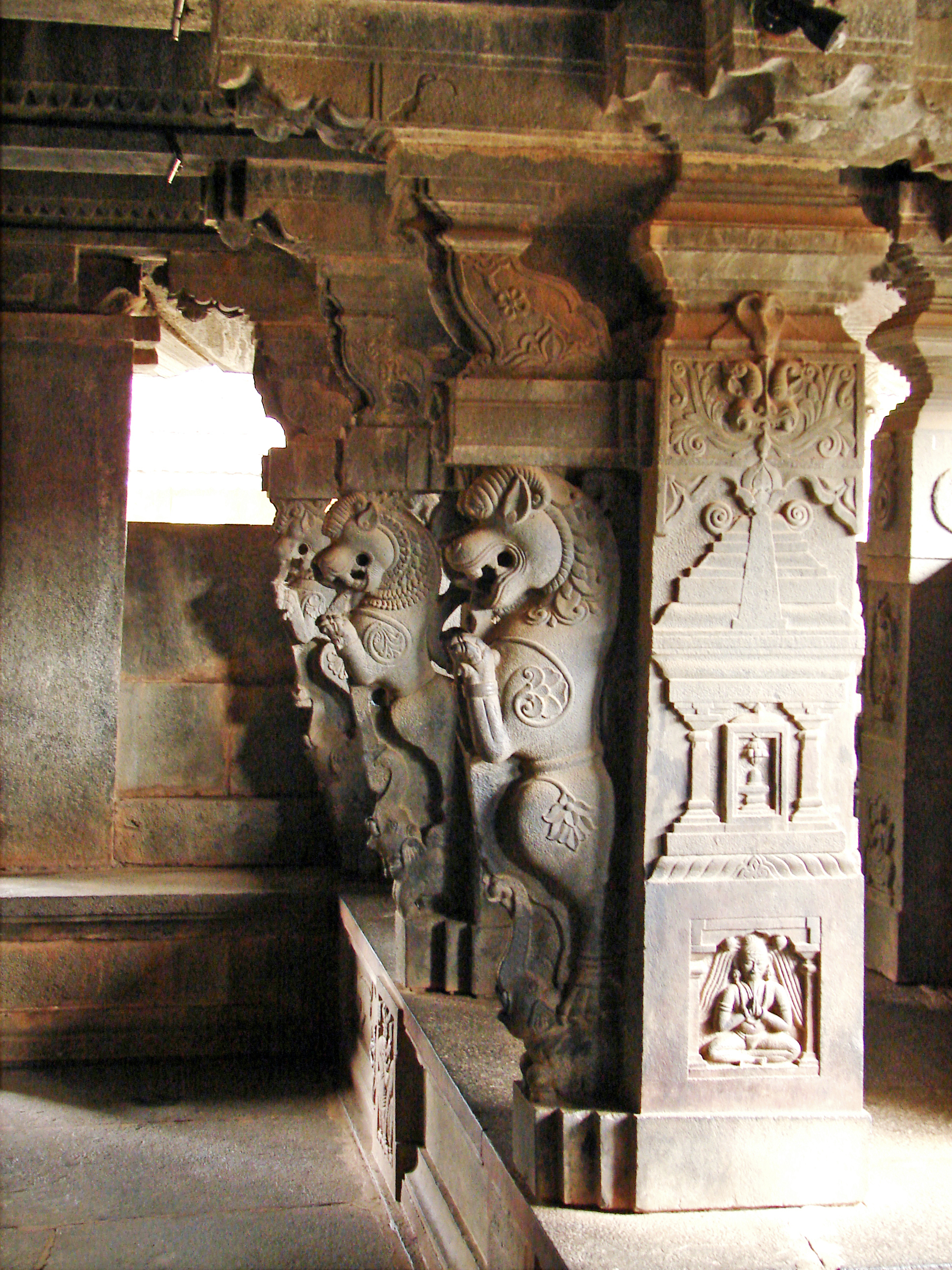
Granite pillars

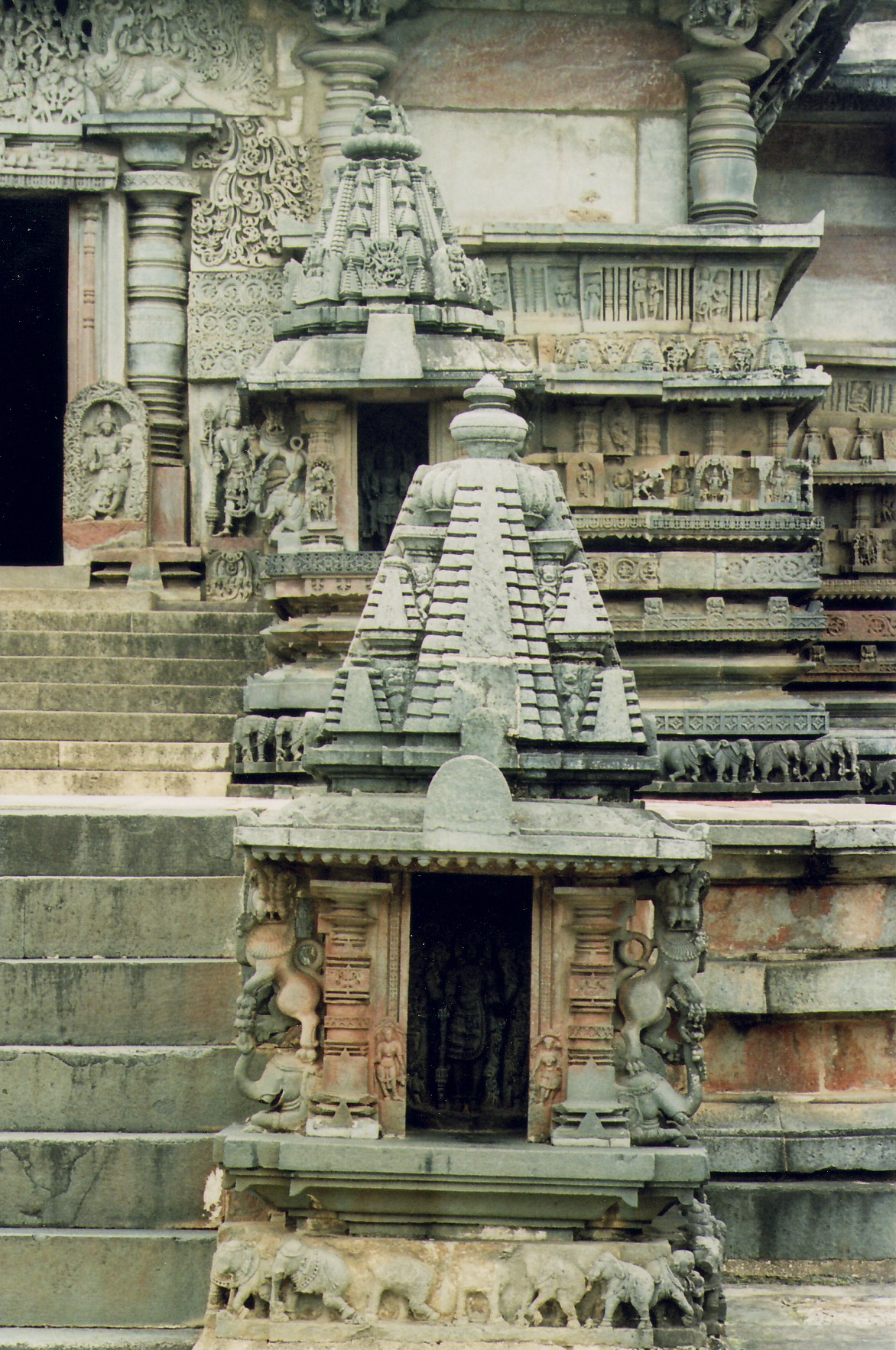
Bhumija towers on minor shrines

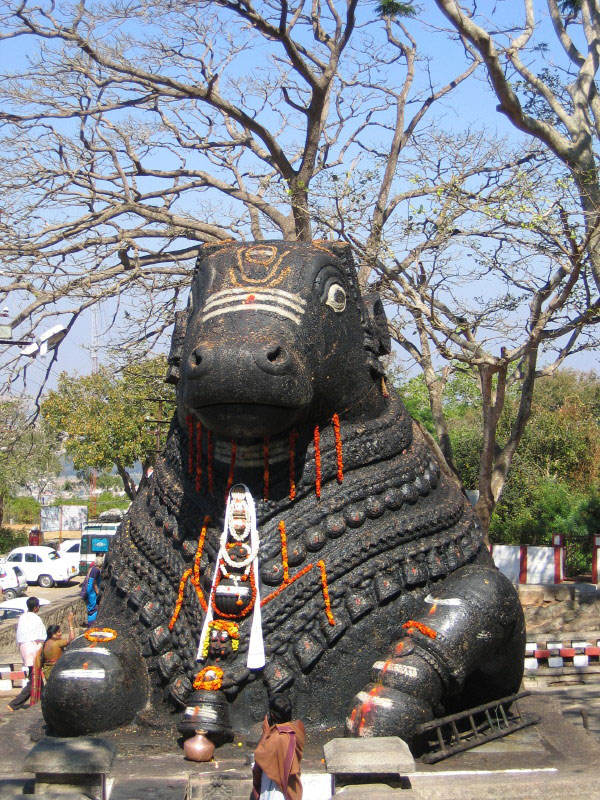
Nandi (bull) sculpted in black stone

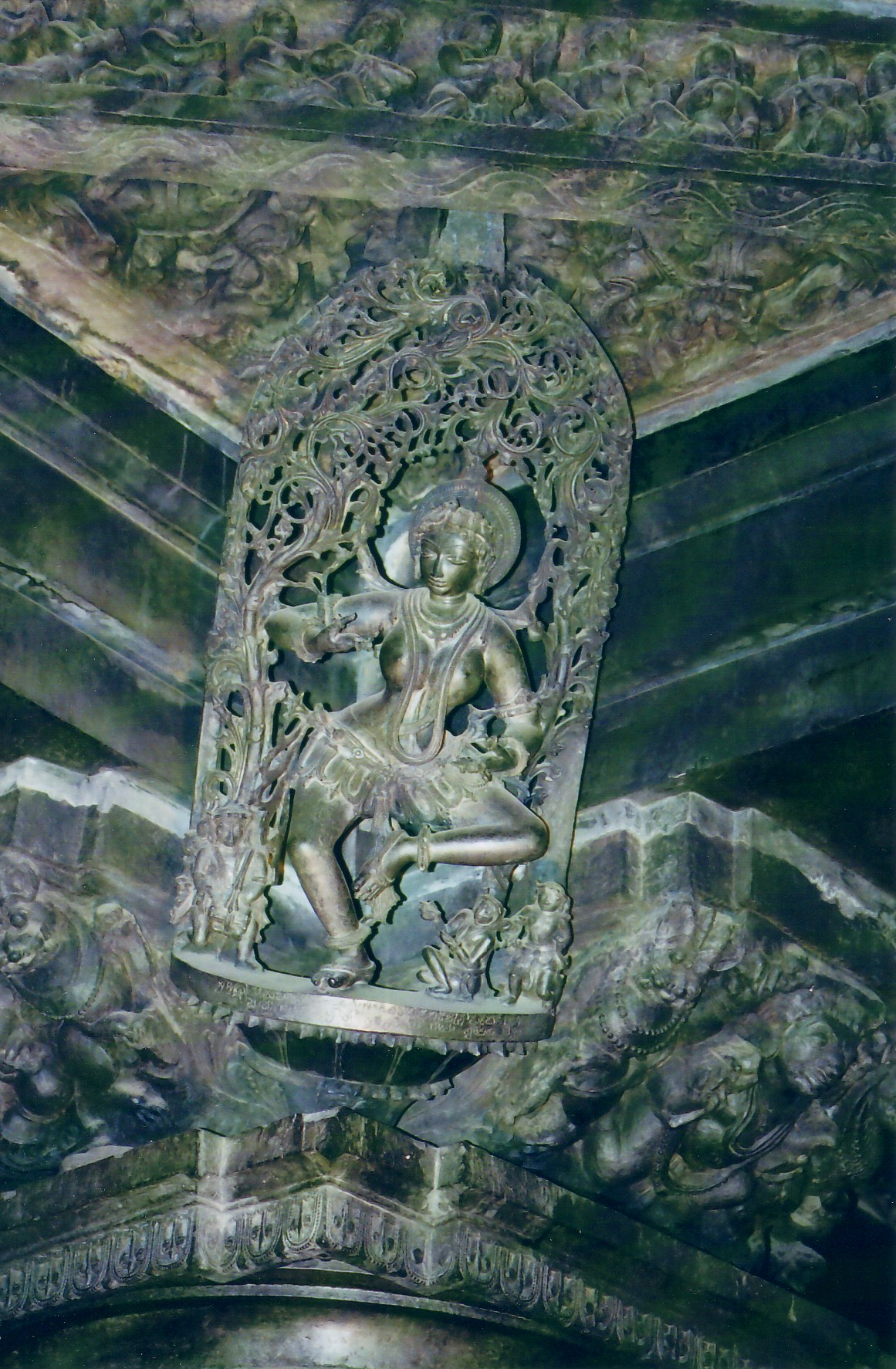
A carved bracket with an Idol in the roof

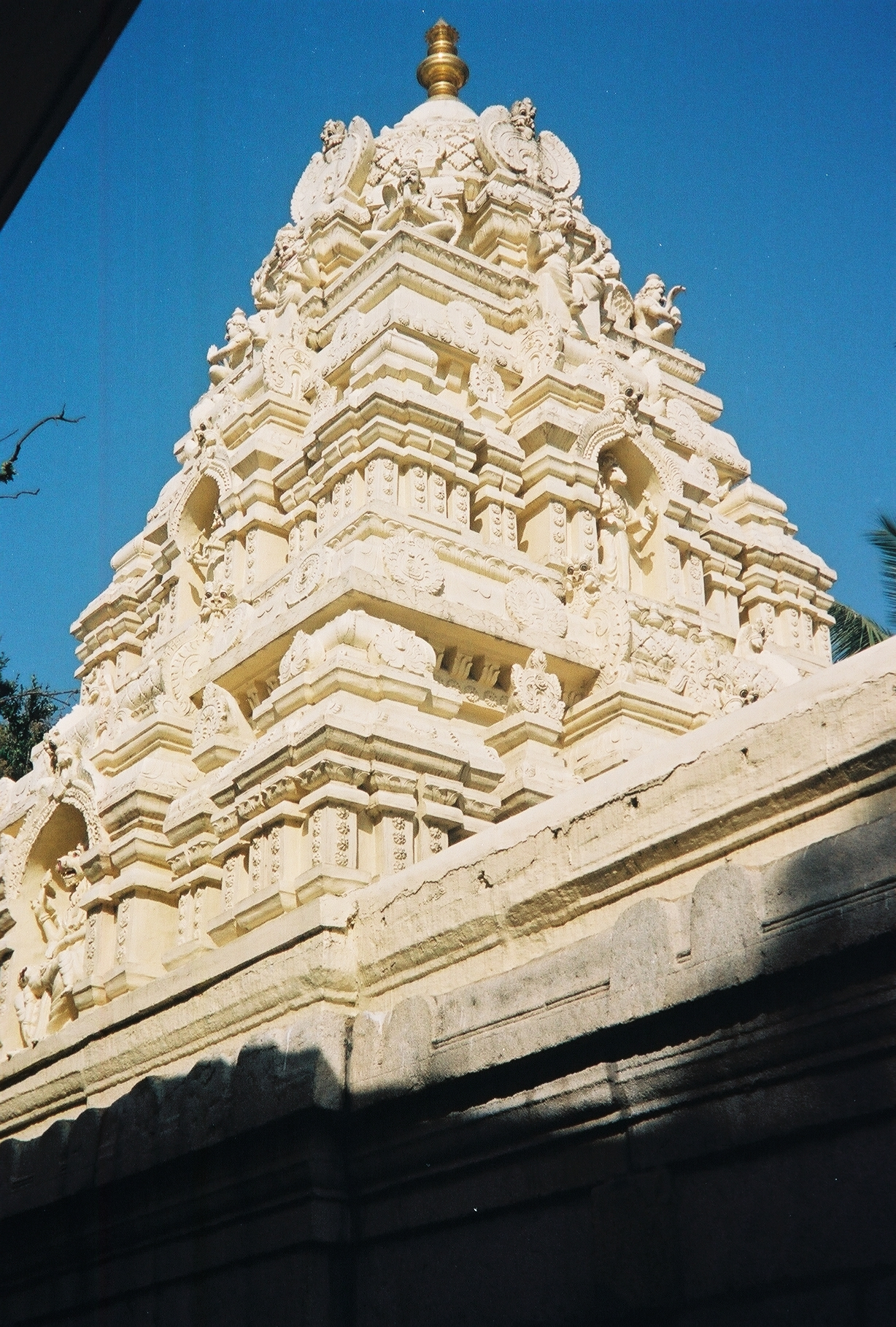
Temple tower (Vijayanaga style)

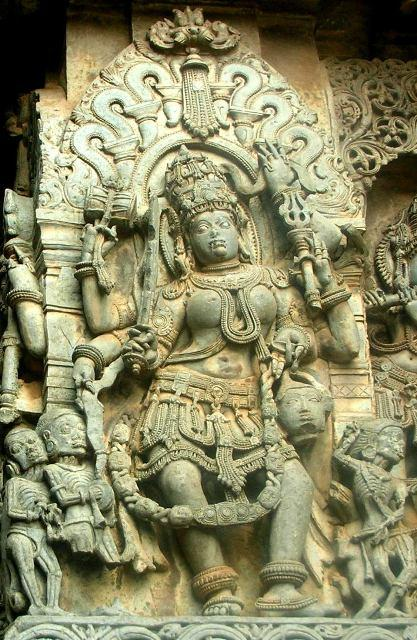
Intricate stone sculpture work typical of Hoysala architecture

== Bibliography ==
- Butalia, Tarunjit Singh; Small, Dianne P. (2004). Religion in Ohio: Profiles of Faith Communities. Ohio University Press. ISBN 978-0-8214-1551-1.
- De, Aditi (2008). Multiple City:Writings on Bangalore. Penguin Books India, New Delhi. pp. 49–59.
- Fergusson, James (1876). A History of Architecture in All Countries: From the Earliest Times to the Present Day. Vol. 3. John Murray.
- Haig, Major T. W. (1907). Historic Landmarks of the Deccan. Pioneer Press, Allahabad.
- Kamat, Suryanatha (1980). A concise history of Karnataka from pre-historic times to the present. Archana Prakashana (Bangalore).
- Panikar, Agustin (2010). Jainism: History, Society, Philosophy and Practice. Lala Sunder Lal Jain research series. Vol. 24. Delhi: Motilal Banarsidass. ISBN 978-81-208-3460-6.
- Paul, George S. (2019). Vasundhara - Odyssey of a Dancer. Chennai: Notion Press. ISBN 978-1-64587-531-4.
- Rao, Bindu Gopal (8 March 2020). "The Jain Trail".
- Sewell, Robert (1882). New Imperial Series. The Imperial Gazetteer of India. Vol. 7. E. Keys, at the government press.
- Yazdani, Ghulam (1995). Bidar, Its History and Monuments.

=== Books ===
- Kulkarni, R. H. (24 November 2009). Pre and Early Chalukya Sculpture Origin and Development. Harman Publishing House, A-23, Naraina Industrial Area, Phase II, New Delhi-110028. Archived from the original on 21 April 2011.
