= Charukeerthi =

Charukeerthi may refer to these Jain temples in Karnataka, India:

- Bhattarak Charukeerthi, Moodabidri
- Bhattarak Charukeerthi, Shravanabelagola
