= Saavira Kambada Basadi =

Jain temple in Karnataka, India

- Tribhuvana Tilaka Cūḍāmaṇi
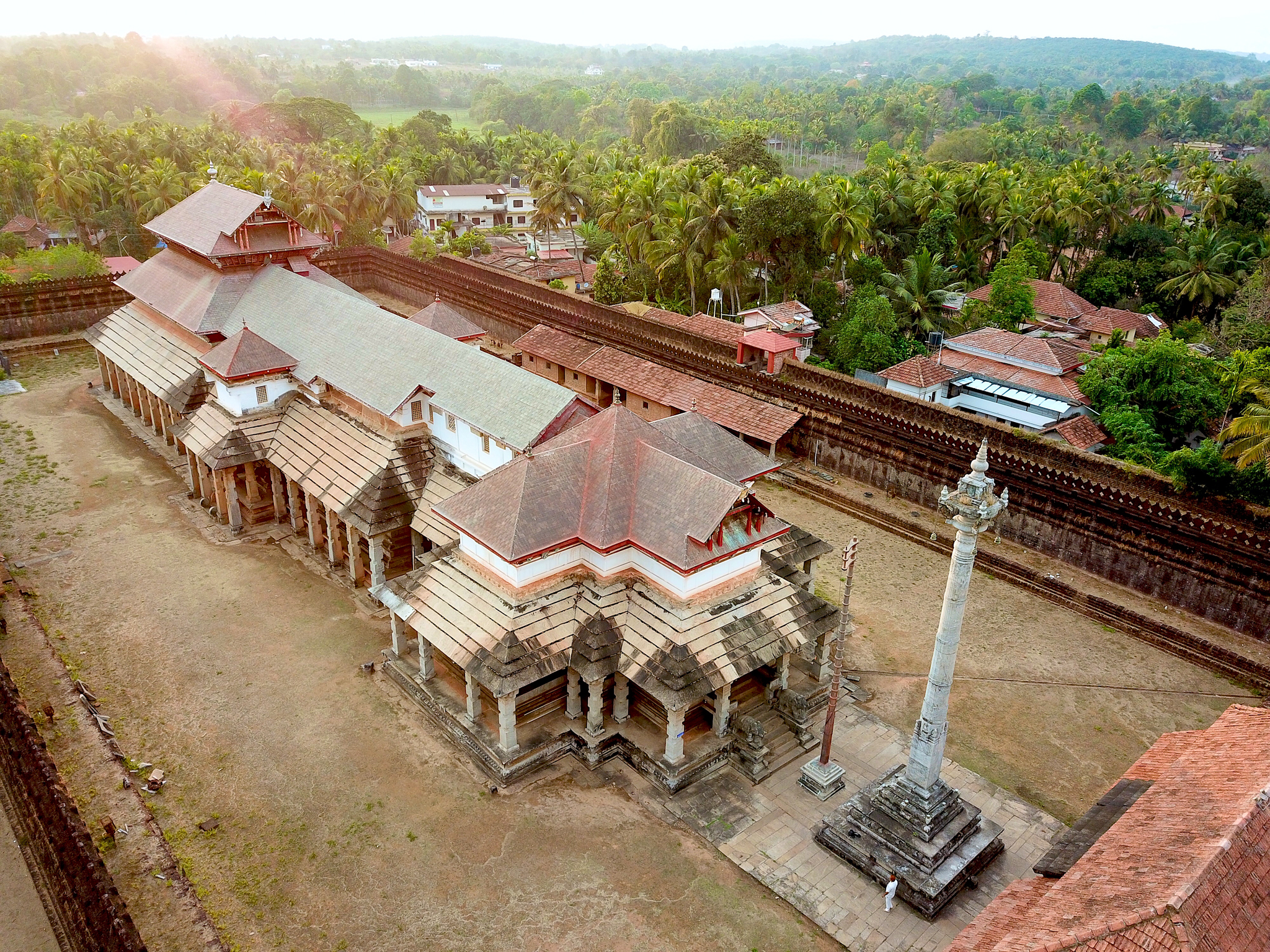
- Sāvira Kambada Temple, Karnataka

Religion
- Affiliation: Jainism
- Deity: Chandraprabhu
- Festival: Mahavir Jayanti
- Governing body: Shri Moodabidri Jain Matha
- Bhattaraka: Charukeerti Panditacharya Varya

Location
- Location: Moodabidri, Karnataka
- Interactive map of Saavira Kambada Basadi
- Coordinates: 13°04′27.3″N 74°59′51.5″E

Architecture
- Style: Dravidian
- Creator: Devaraya Wodeyar
- Established: 1430; 596 years ago
- Temple: 18

Website
- www.jainkashi.com

Saavira Kambada Temple (Sāvira Kambada Basadi) or Tribhuvana Tilaka Cūḍāmaṇi), is a basadi or Jain temple noted for its 1000 pillars in Moodabidri, Karnataka, India. The temple is also known as "Chandranatha Temple" since it honours the tirthankara Chandraprabha, whose eight-foot idol is worshipped in the shrine.

The town of Moodabidri is noted for its 18 Jain temples, but Saavira Kambada Temple is considered the finest among them. The temple is considered an architectural wonder and is a major attraction of Moodabidri.

== History ==
The Basadi was built by the local chieftain, Devaraya Wodeyar in 1430 and took 31 years to complete, additions to temples were made in 1962. The shrine has a 50 feet tall monolith manasthambha erected by Karkala Bhairava Queen Nagala Devi.

== Architecture ==
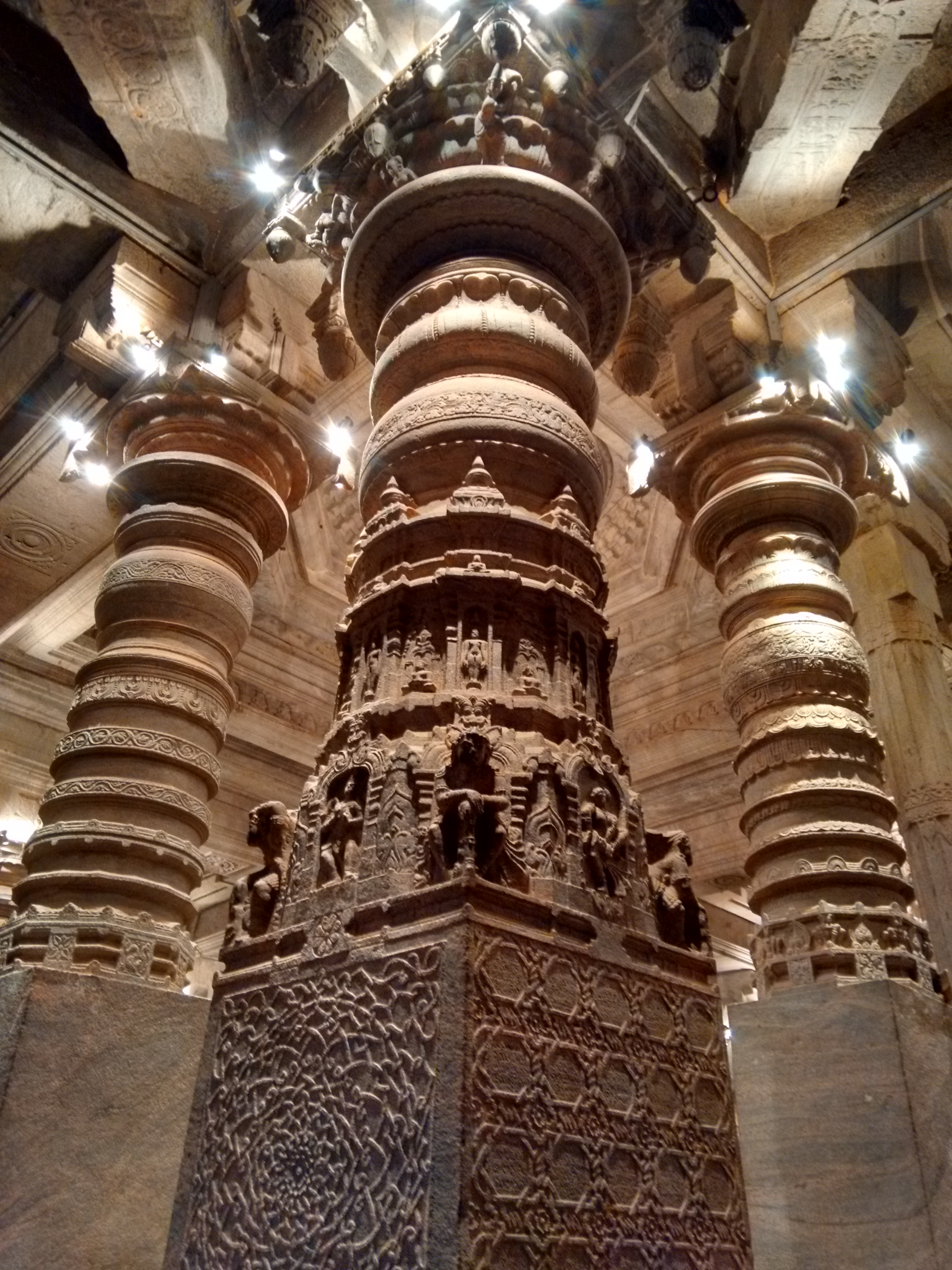
Intricate carvings of pillar

The temple is built in dravidian architecture and is considered an architectural wonder. The temple is full of elaborate sculptures and decoration. The doorway of the temple has intricate carvings and is enclosed with ornate walls. The massive pillars of the temple are carved to resemble an octagonal wooden log with one baring inscription. The 1000 pillars with exquisite detail, support the temple and no two pillars are alike. The sloping roof of veranda are made of wood coated with copper tiles resembling the temples of Nepal. The temple complex has seven mandapas supported by beautifully carved pillars built in the Vijayanagara style. The main mandapa of the temple consists of two interconnected column halls. The fourth mandapa houses a sculpture of Bhairavadevi. The top two storeys are carved in wood and the lowest one in stone.

The hall interiors are massive, with elaborately decorated columns and a door flanked by two protector deities. The wooden panels inside the temples have carvings of Tirthankara flanked by elephants, guardian deities and female attendants holding flowers. Several bronze Jain idols in ornated frames are placed inside the garbhagriha. The 8 ft idol of Chandranatha Swami made of panchadhatu present in the garbha griha. The temple are built similar to temples in Nepal. The interiors of the temple are richly and variedly carved. A large number of tombs of Jain monks are present near the temple premise. The manastambha in front of the temple is noteworthy. The pillars inside the hall bear carvings of dragon and giraffe resulting from the influence of trade with China in 15th century. The image of Nandishwar-dweep dated 16th century is notable.

Saavira Kambada Basadi along with Shravanabelagola, Kamal Basadi and Brahma Jinalaya are considerest the most important Jain centers in Karnataka.

== Other Jain temples in Moodabidri ==
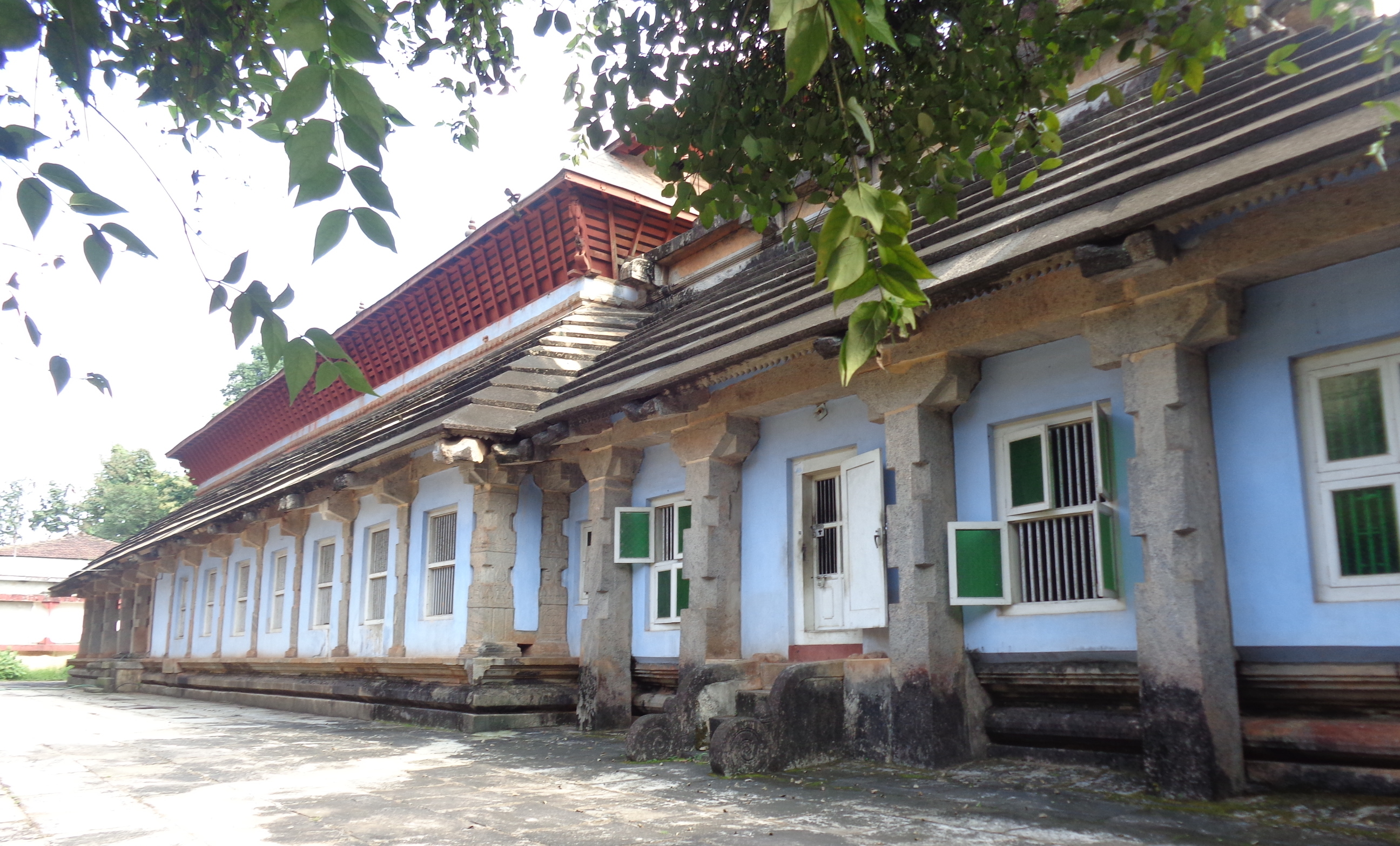
Guru Basadi dated back to c. 714 CE

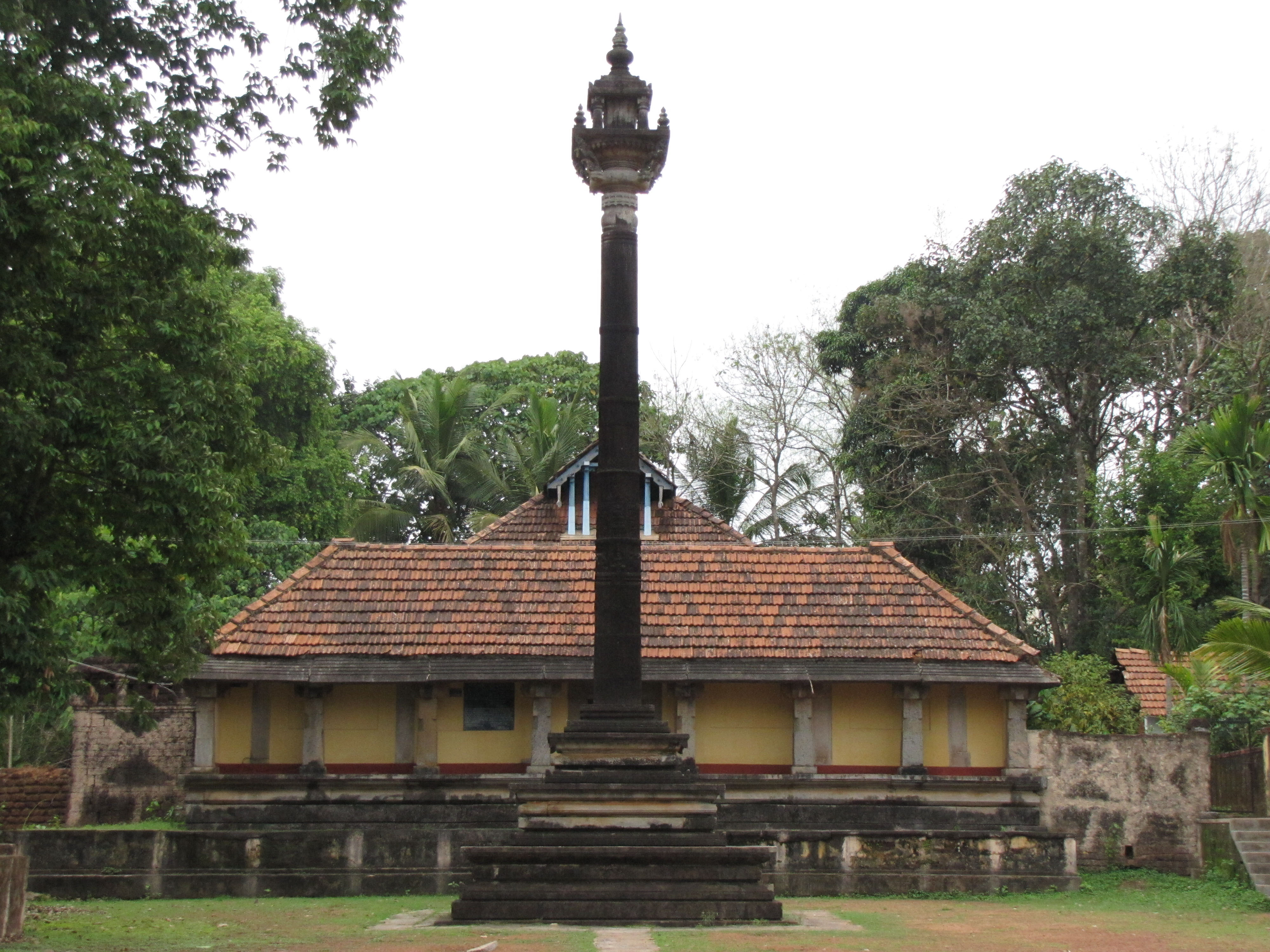
Leppada Basadi built in the 14th century

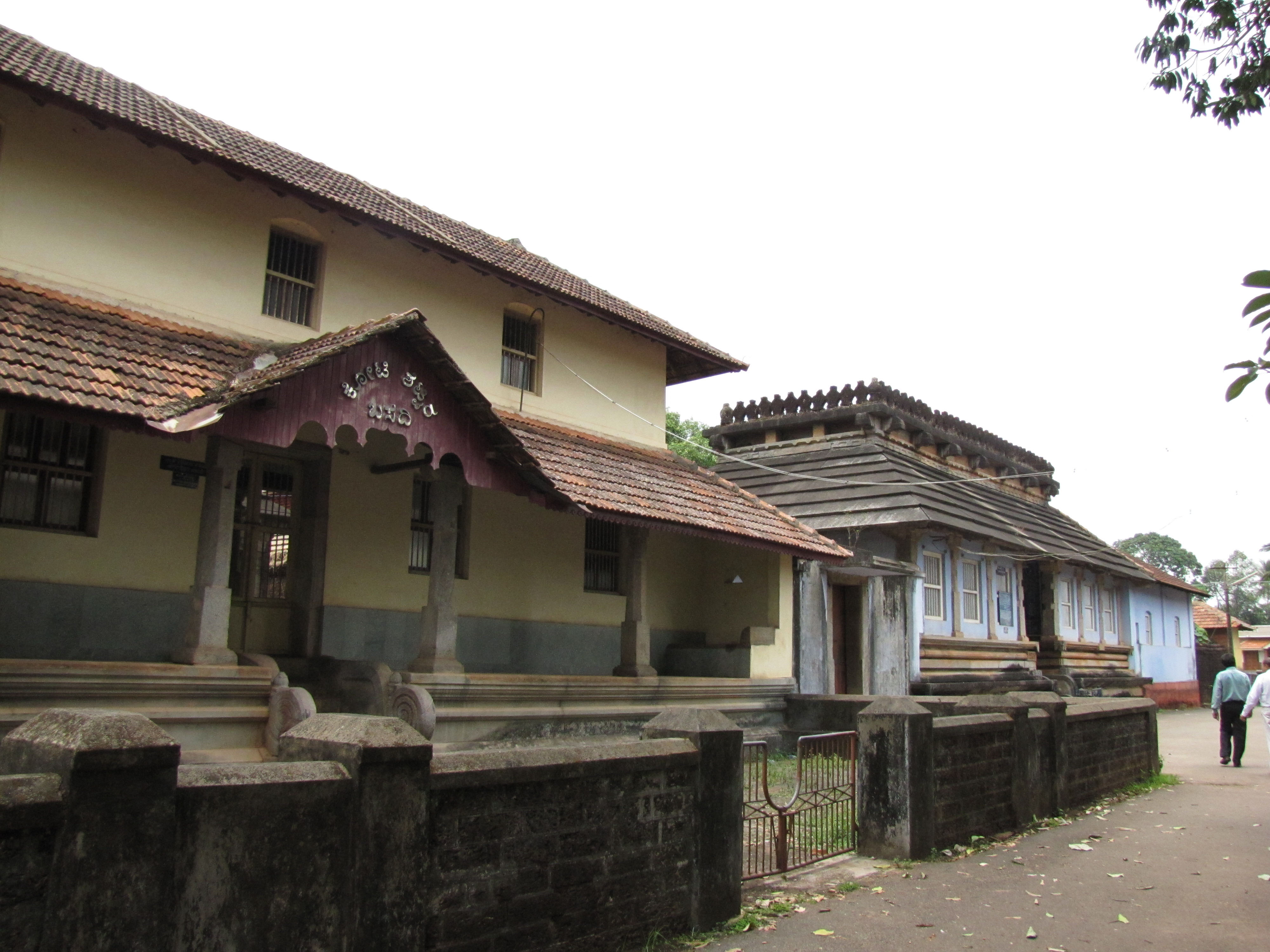
Koti Basadi

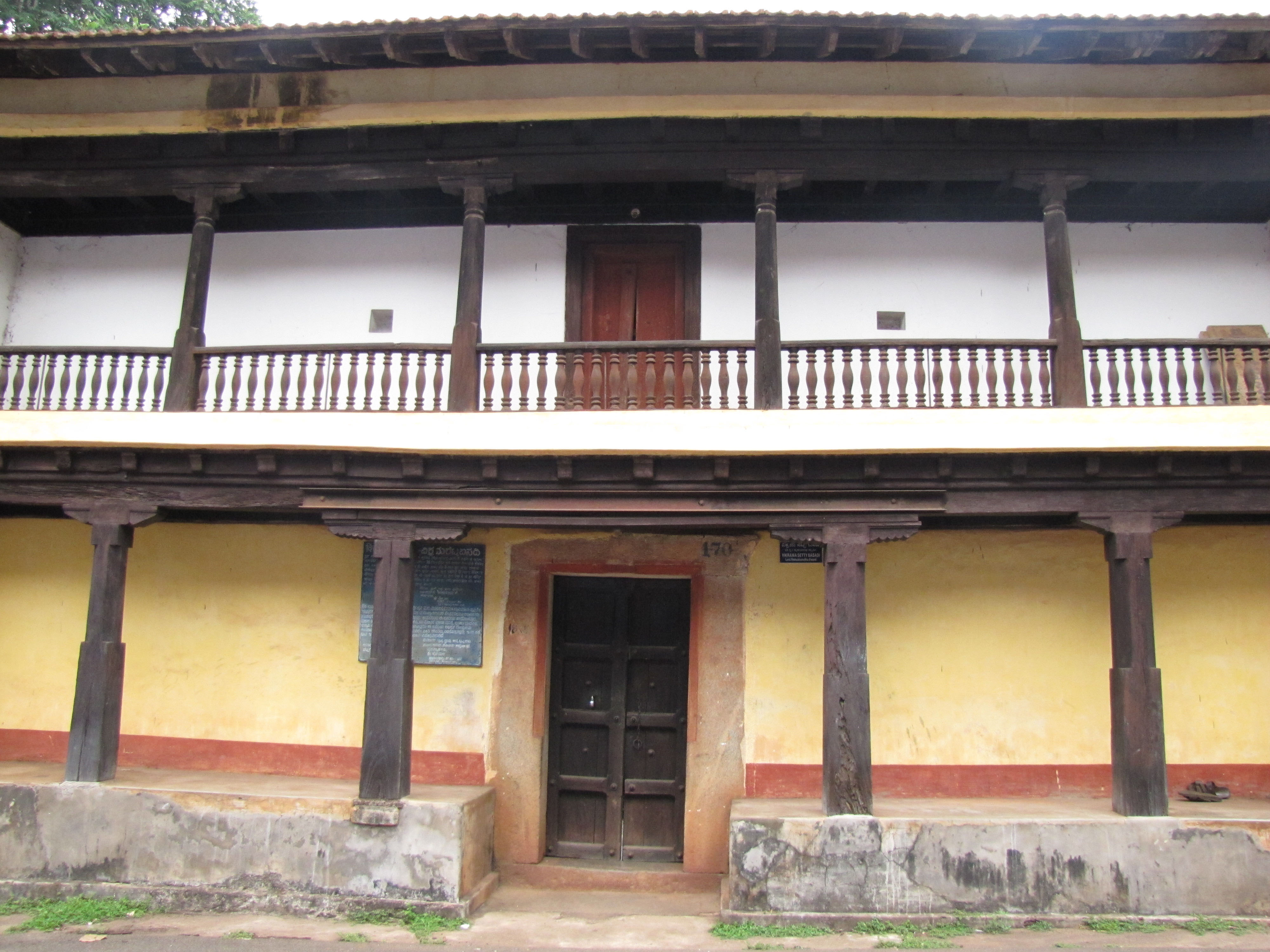
Vikram Setty Basadi

=== Guru Basadi ===
Guru basadi is the earliest of the Jain monuments built in 714 AD. A black stone idol of Parshwanatha, about 3.5 metres (11 ft) tall, is installed in the sanctum of this basadi. The temples also house 12th-century Jain palm leaf manuscripts known as ‘Dhavala texts’ are preserved. These texts were brought from shravanabelagola to here during the Mughal invasion. This basadi is also called Siddantha Basadi and Hale Basadi.

=== All Jain temples in Moodabidri ===
Moodabidri is noted for its 18 Jain Temples, mentioned as follows:

- Guru Basadi
- Koti Basadi
- Hosa Basadi (Thousand Pillar Temple)
- Badaga Basadi
- Settar Basadi
- Ammanavara Basadi
- Betkeri Basadi
- Vikrama Setty Basadi
- Kallu Basadi
- Leppada Basadi
- Deramma Setty Basadi
- Chola Setty Basadi
- Mahadeva Setty Basadi
- Baikana-Thikari Basadi
- Kere Basadi
- Padu Basadi
- Sri Jain Mathada Basadi
- Jain Pathasale Basadi

== Moodabidri Jain Math ==
There is a matha at Moodabidri responsible for the upkeep and maintenance of temples in Moodabidri. It is known as the Jain Varanasi of the South.

== Bhaṭṭāraka Charukeerthi ==
A bhaṭṭāraka seat exists at Moodabidri responsible for administering the 18 temples at Moodabidri and the other temples in the surrounding areas. The name given to the bhaṭṭāraka of Moodabidri is Charukeerthi.

== In popular culture ==
The temple is listed as one of the temples in the Fodor's "India's Jain Temples Are Incredible Architectural Marvels" series. In 2025, Airavata, a 3 metres (9.8 ft) mechanical elephant, was installed at the Thousand Pillar Jain Temple.

== Gallery ==
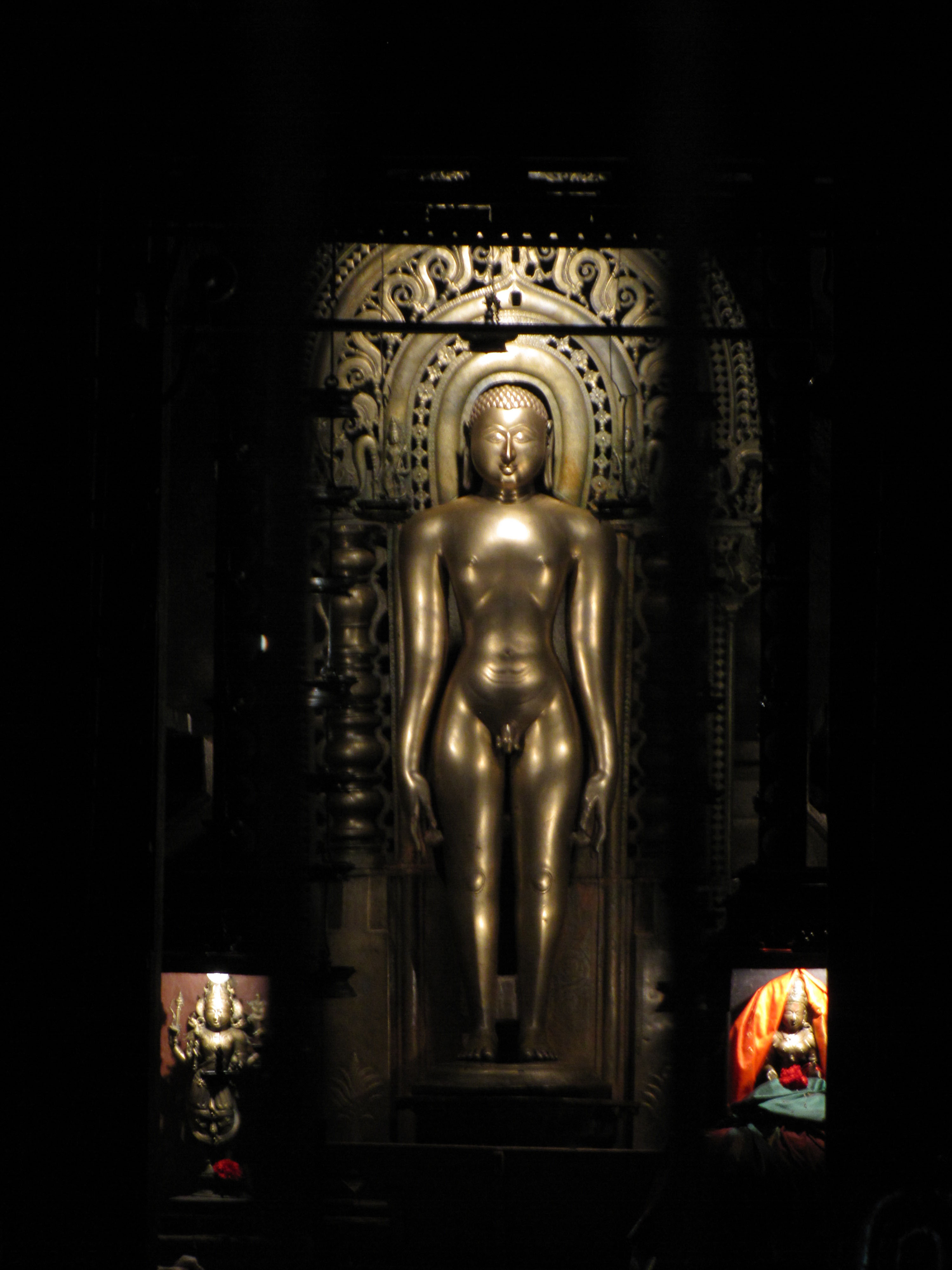
Idol of Chandraprabha, 8th Tirthankara

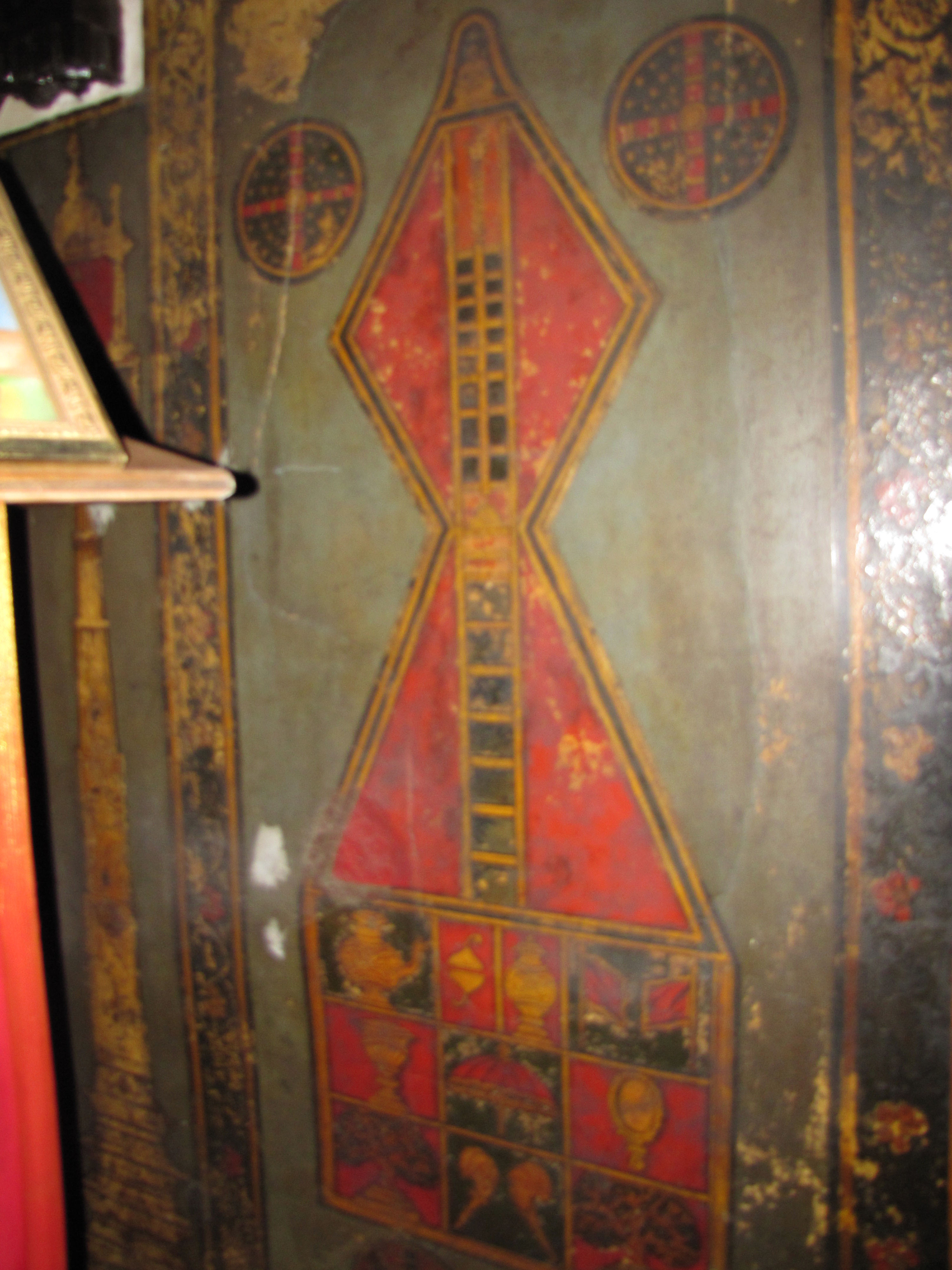
Painting depicting universe as per Jain cosmology

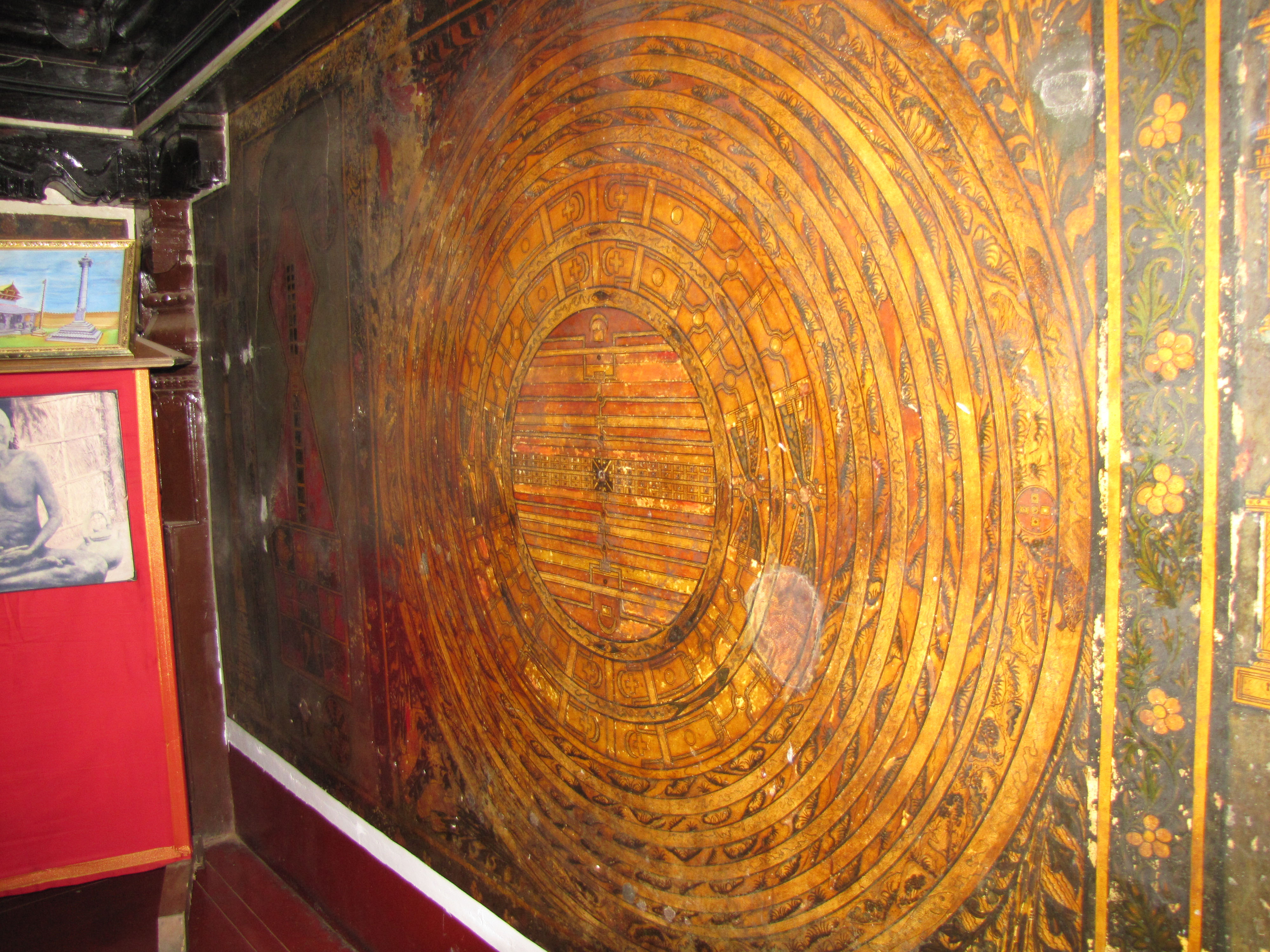
Painting depicting Jambudvipa

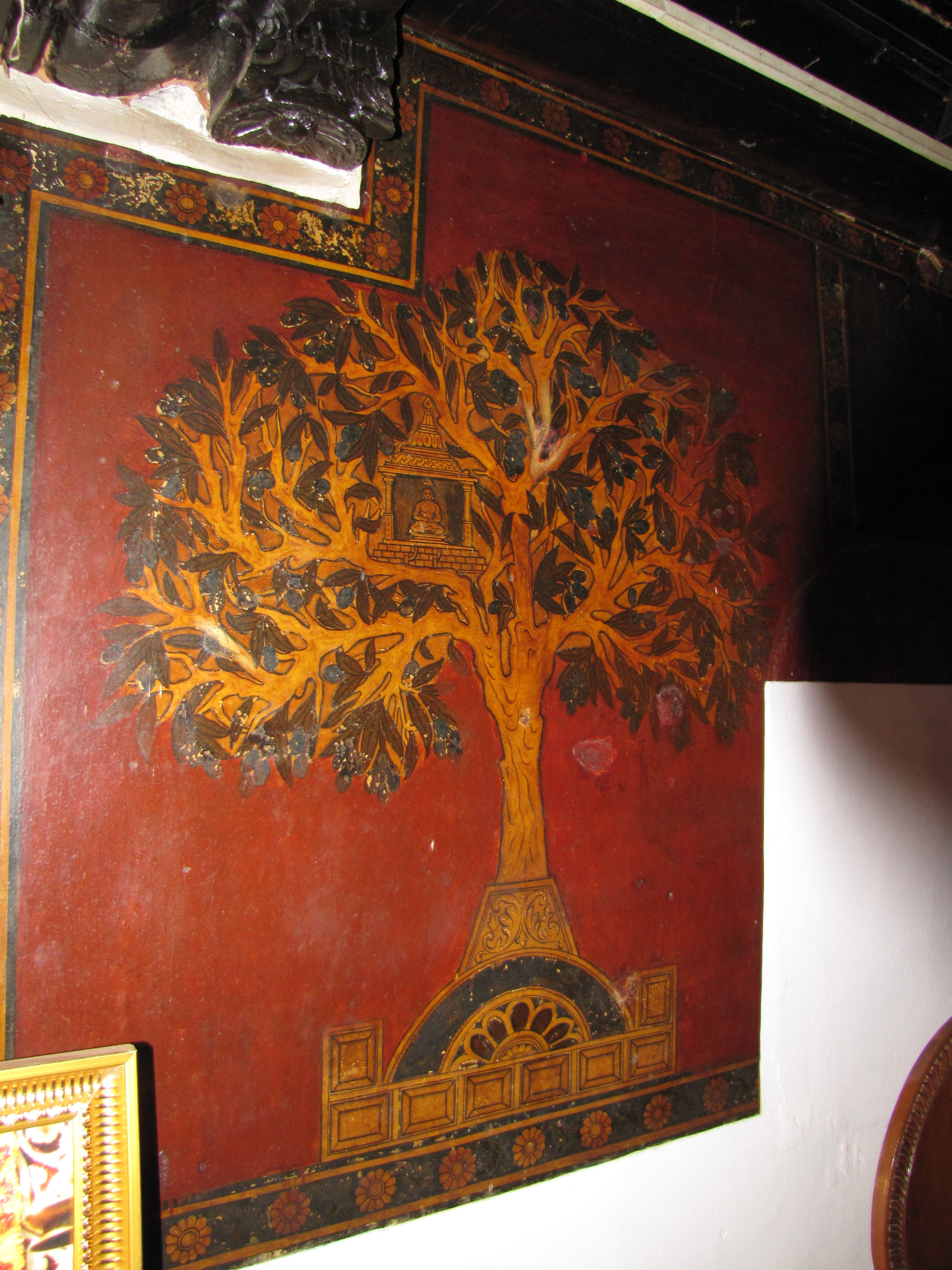
Painting depicting Kalpavriksha

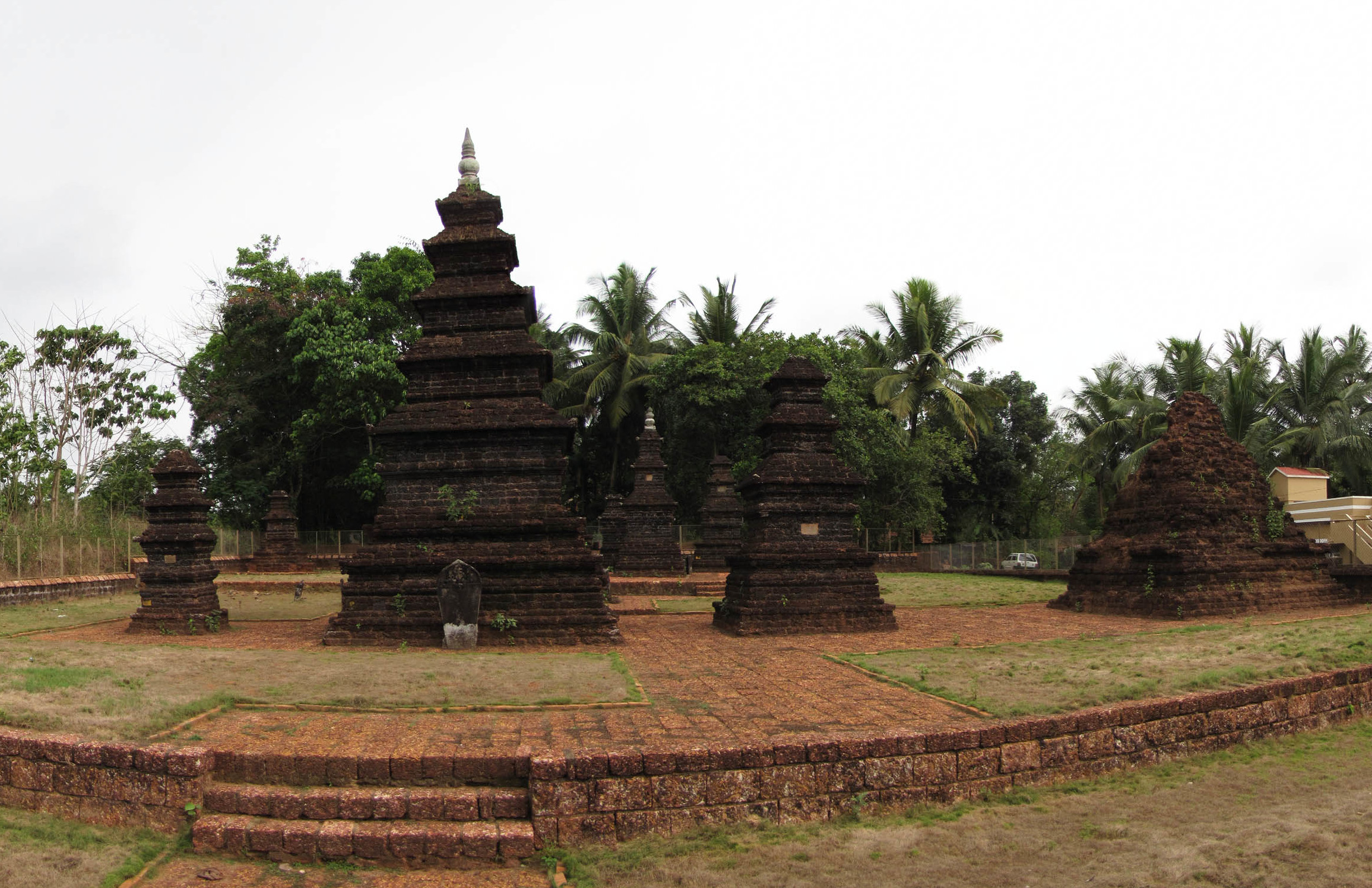
Tombs of Jain monk near the temple

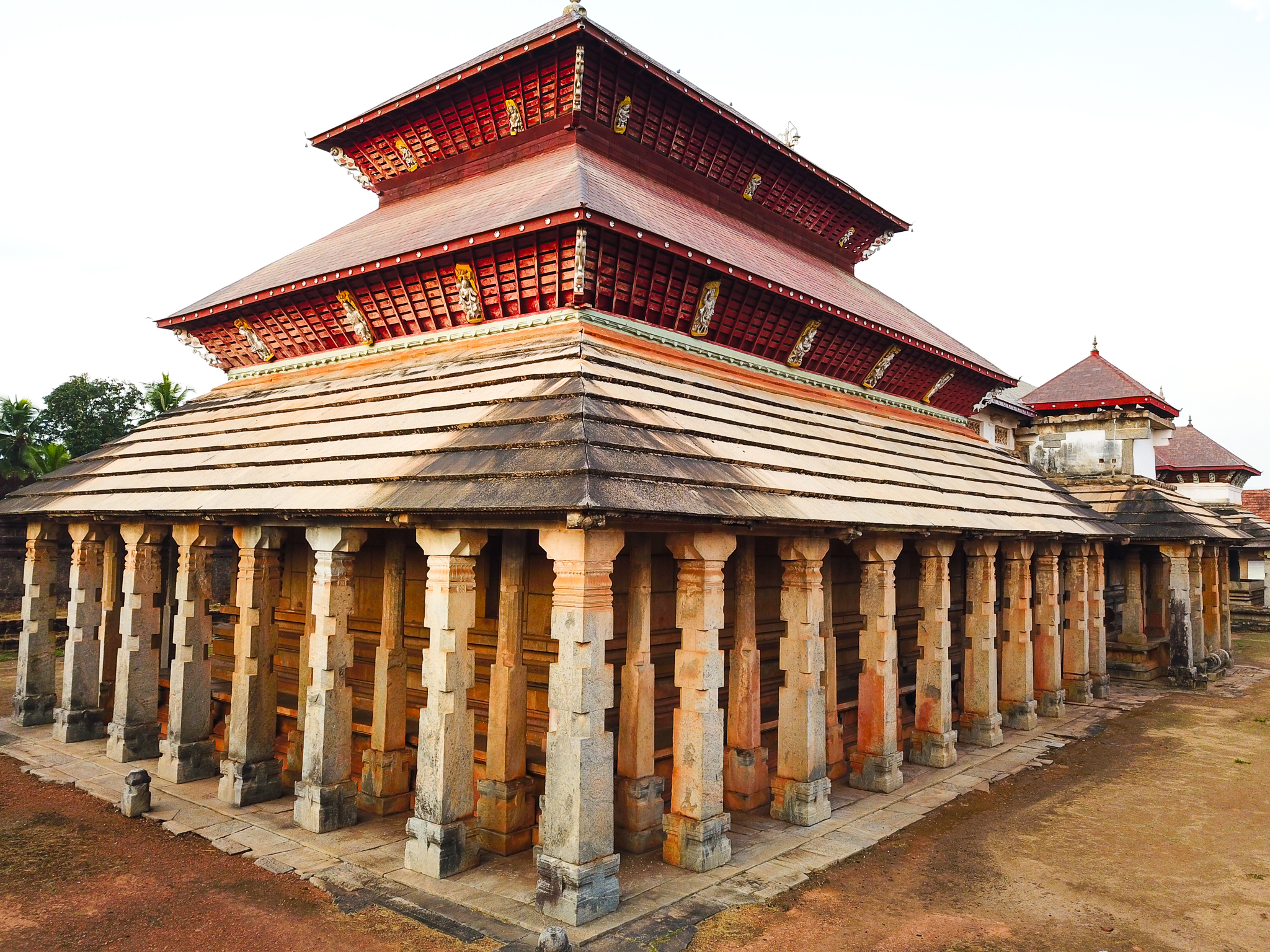
Savira Kambada Basadi - rear view

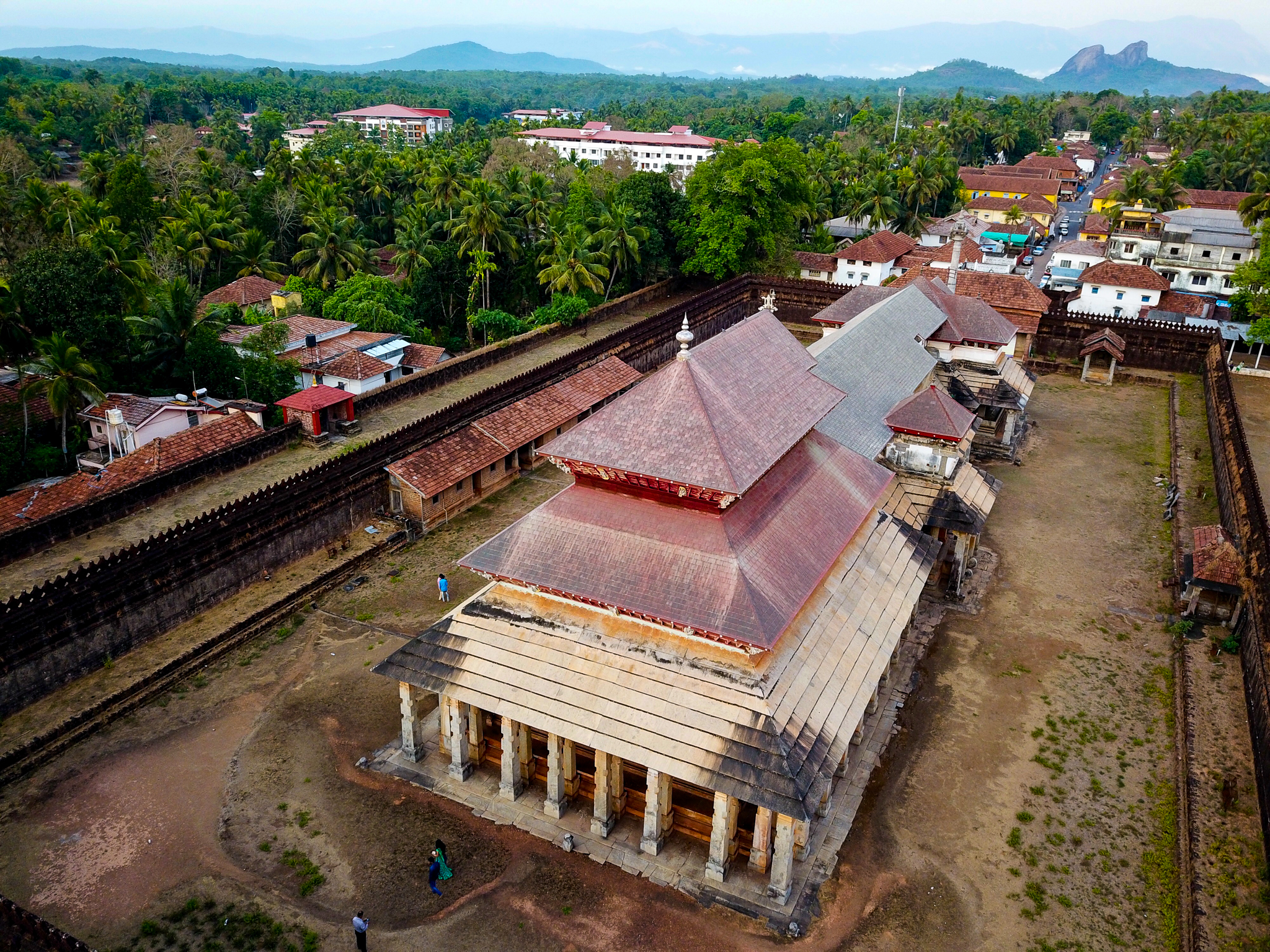
Thousand Pillar Temple View from back Side

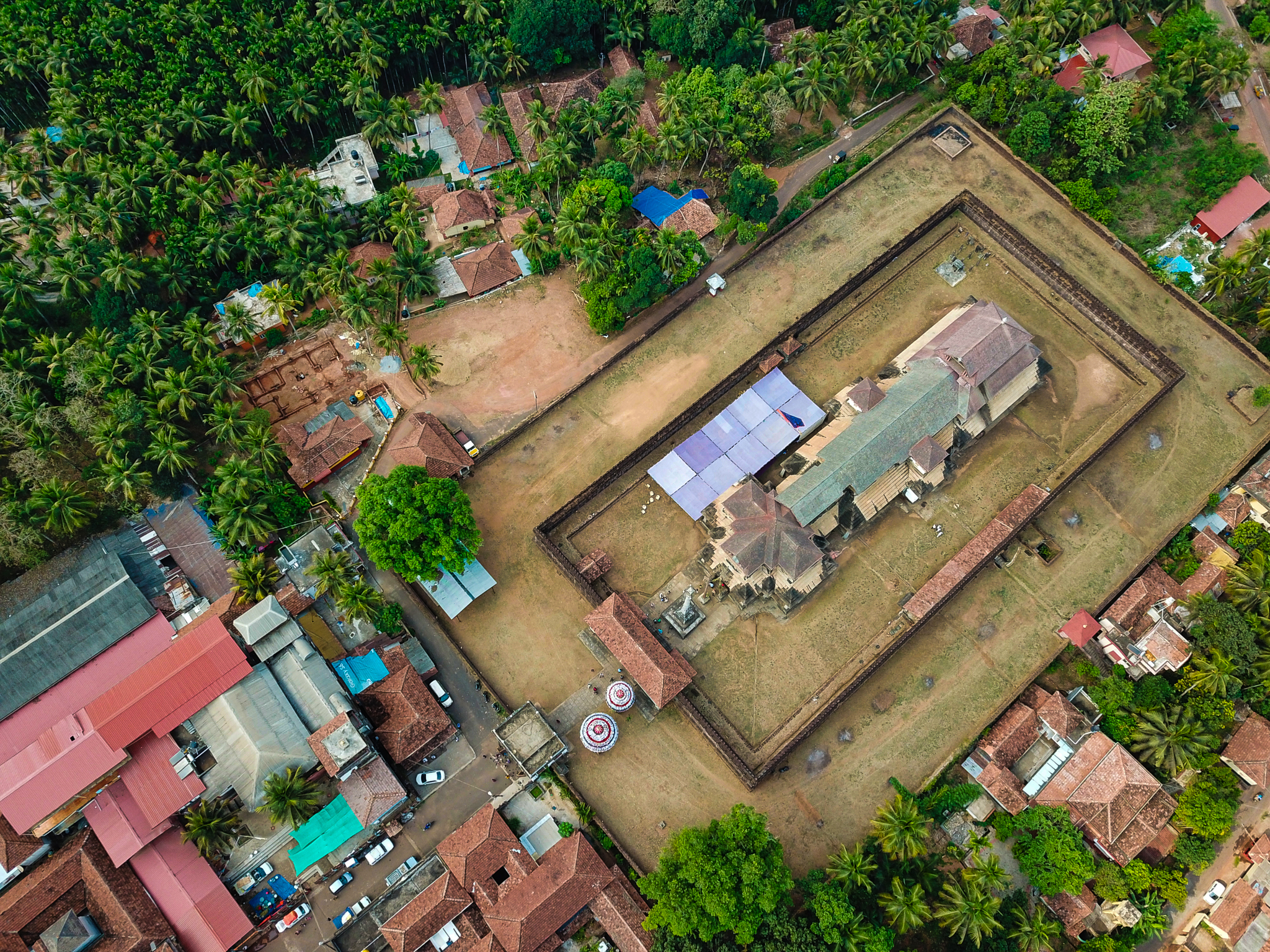
Thousand Pillar Temple - aerial view

== See also ==
- Chaturmukha Basadi
- Jain Bunt
- Jainism in Karnataka
