= Guru Basadi =

Jain temple in Karnataka, India

- ಗುರು ಬಸದಿ
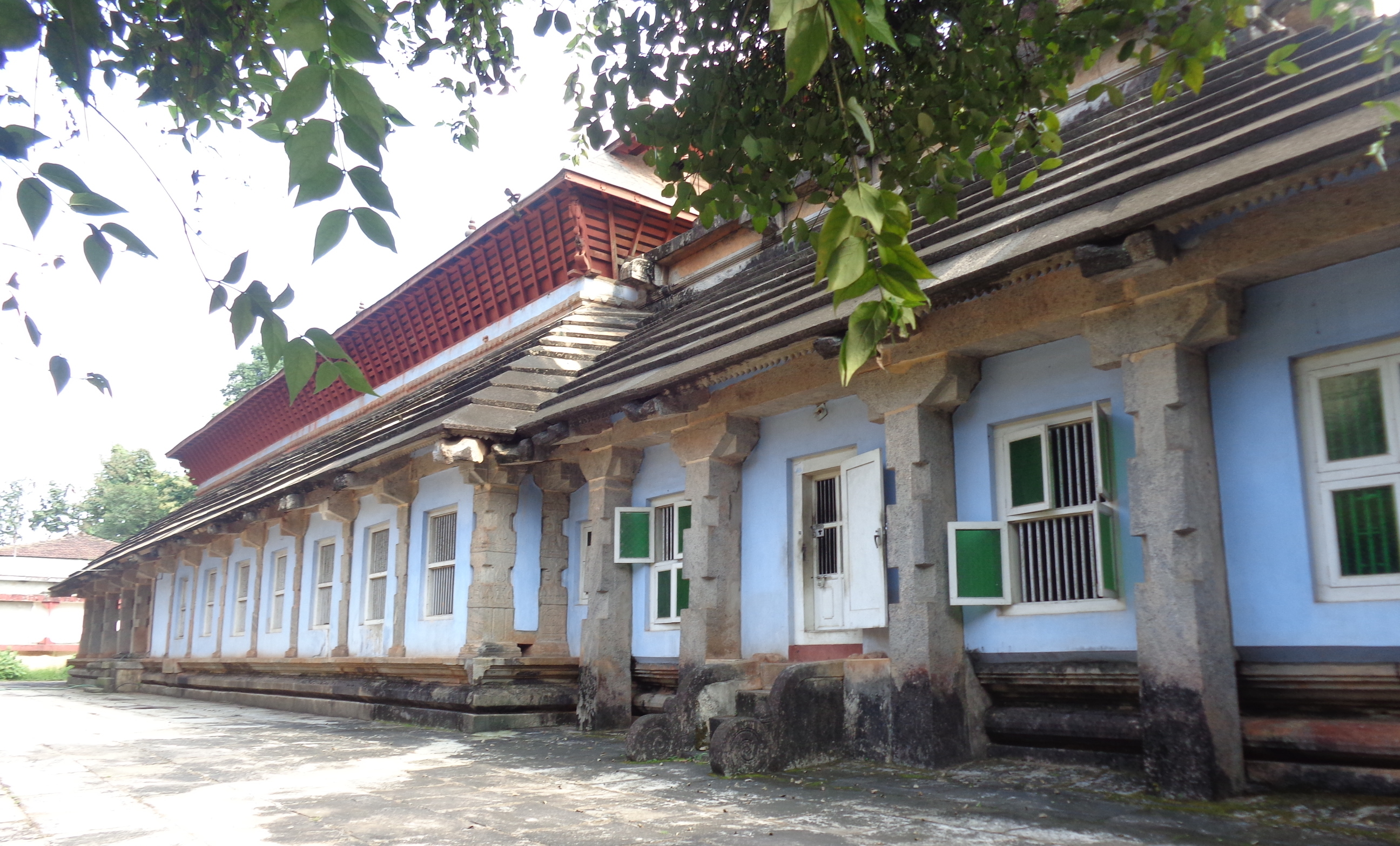
- Guru Basadi

Religion
- Affiliation: Jainism
- Deity: Parshvanatha
- Festival: Mahavir Jayanti
- Governing body: Shri Moodabidri Jain Matha
- Bhattaraka: Charukeerthi Panditacharya Varya

Location
- Location: Moodabidri, Karnataka
- Interactive map of Guru Basadi
- Coordinates: 13°04′27″N 75°00′2.5″E

Architecture
- Established: 714 C.E.
- Temple: 18

Website
- www.jainkashi.com

Guru Basadi is a basadi or Jain temple located in Moodabidri town in the Indian state of Karnataka. The Guru basadi is the oldest amongst 18 Jain basadis in Moodabidri built in 714 CE. This temple is near another Jain temple, Saavira Kambada Basadi.

== History ==
Guru Basadi is the earliest of the Jain monuments built in c. 714 CE. A black stone idol of Parshwanatha, about 3.5 metres (11 ft) tall, is installed in the sanctum of this basadi. According to Jain legend, a Jain sage (Muni) from the 8th century was noticed a cow and a tiger drinking water from the same spot, tiger feeding the calf and cow feeding the tiger cubs while roaming a thick forest. Observing this miracle, the muni got the place excavated and idol of Parshvanatha was found in the area and a temple was consecrated here.

An inscription dated back to 1307 CE inside Tirthankar Basadi mentions Guru Basadi receiving grants. The manastambha inside the temple was erected in 1615 CE. The temple also houses the rare Jain palm leaf manuscripts of 12th century CE known as ‘Dhavala texts’ are preserved. These texts were brought from shravanabelagola to here during Mughal invasion. This basadi is also called Siddantha Basadi and Hale Basadi.

== Architecture ==
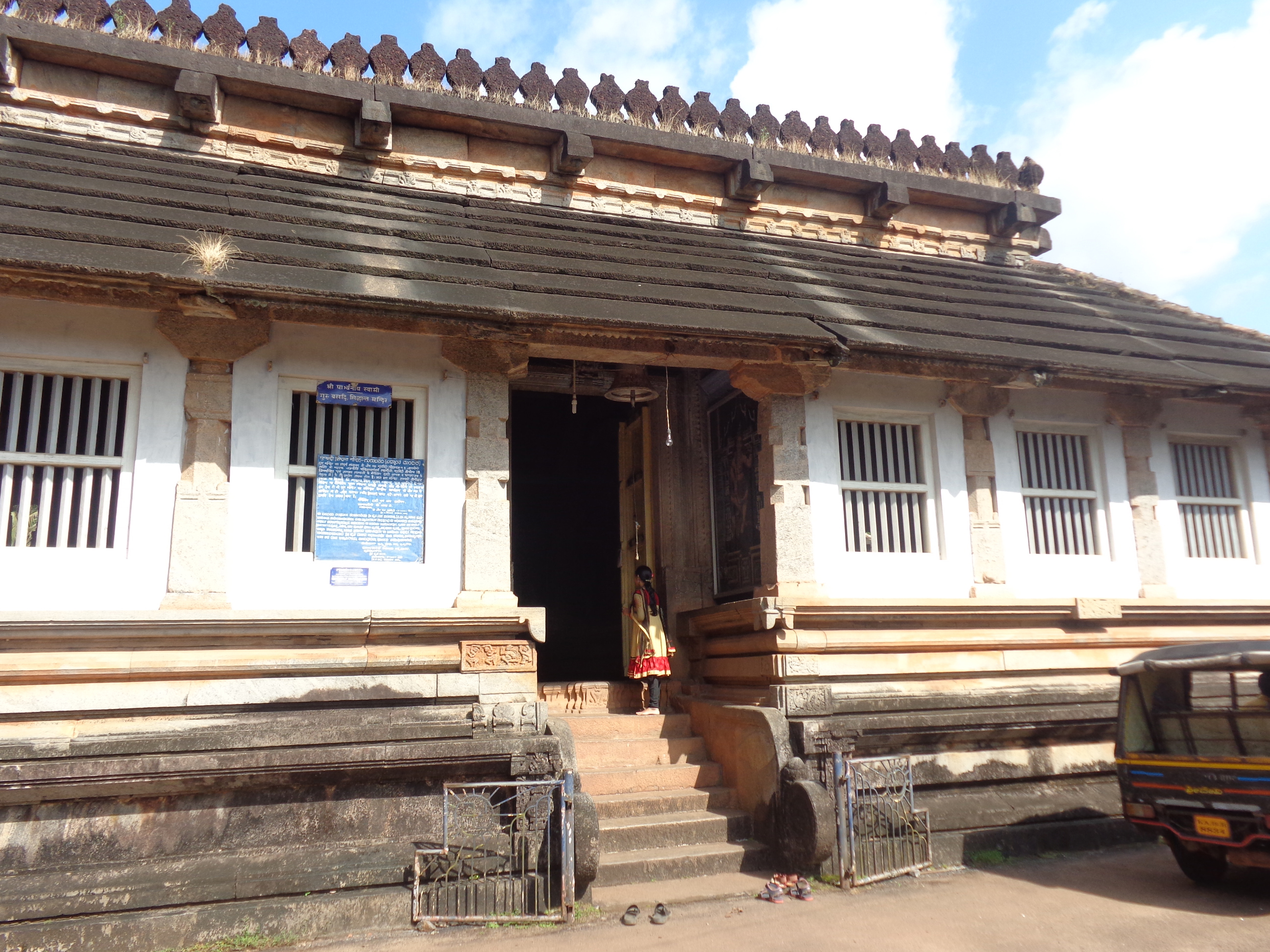
Guru Basadi front view

The Guru Basadi is almost as large as the famous Saavira Kambada Basadi located near the Guru Basadi(About 10 mis away). The temple is a rectangular structure with three mandapa leading to garbhagriha that houses an 2 metres (6 ft 7 in) idol of Parshvanatha as the moolnayak of the temple. The outer hall is supported by beautifully carved pillars. The temple entrance has finely carved columns that supports a sloped roof. The temple houses a manasthambha in front of the temple entrance. This temple houses miniature idols of many Jain Tirthankars.

Siddhanta Basadi inside Guru Basadi enshrines idol of the 24 Tirthankars made of mainly Diamond and emerald and other precious stones. The temple also houses an idol dating back to the 2nd century BCE. The temple complex also include small temples dedicated to goddess Saraswati and goddess Padmavati.

== Legacy ==
The temple is significant for appointment of the Head of Jain Matha, and coronations of Jain Bhattaraka.

== Gallery ==
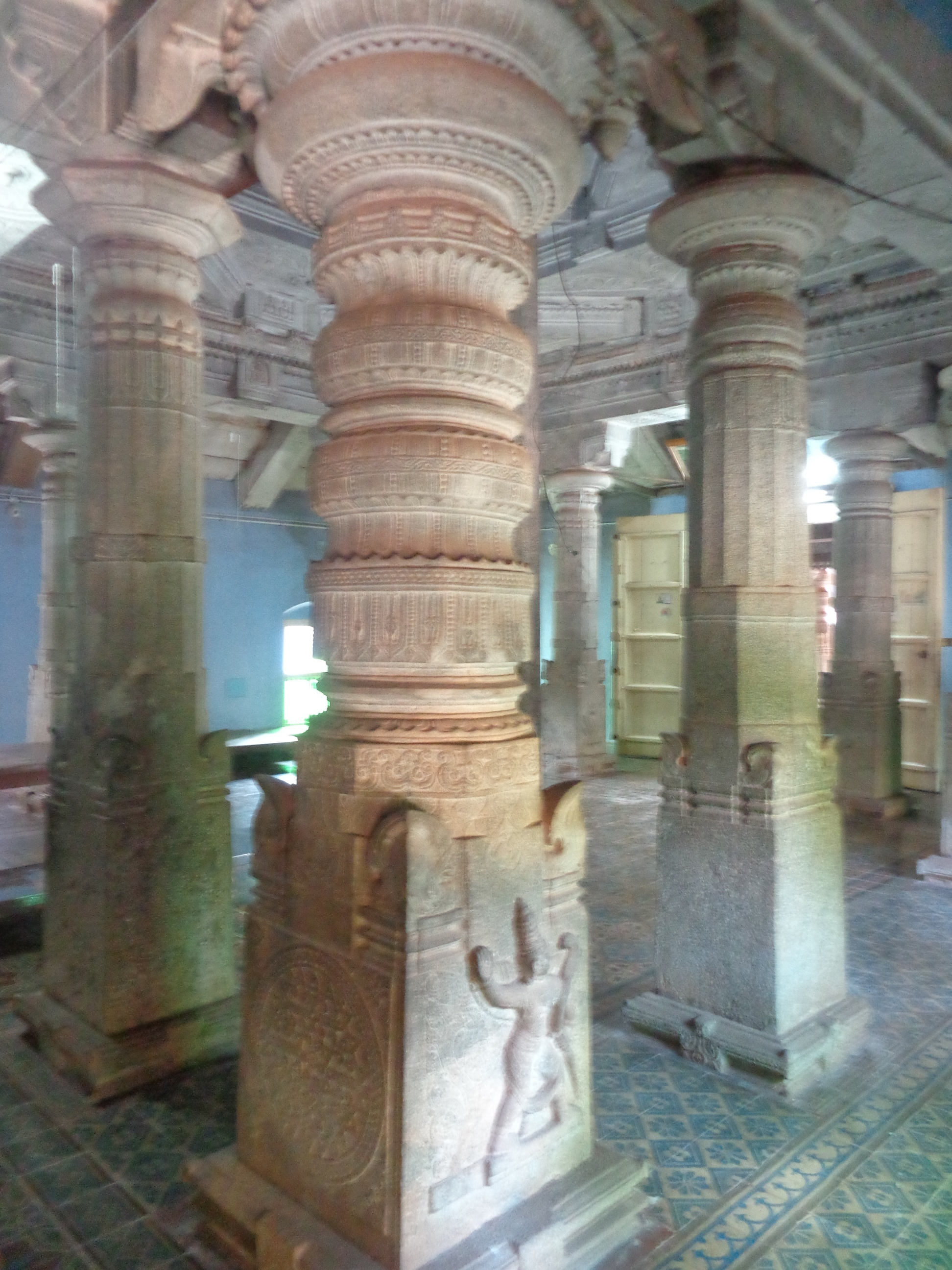
Intricate carvinged pillars inside temple

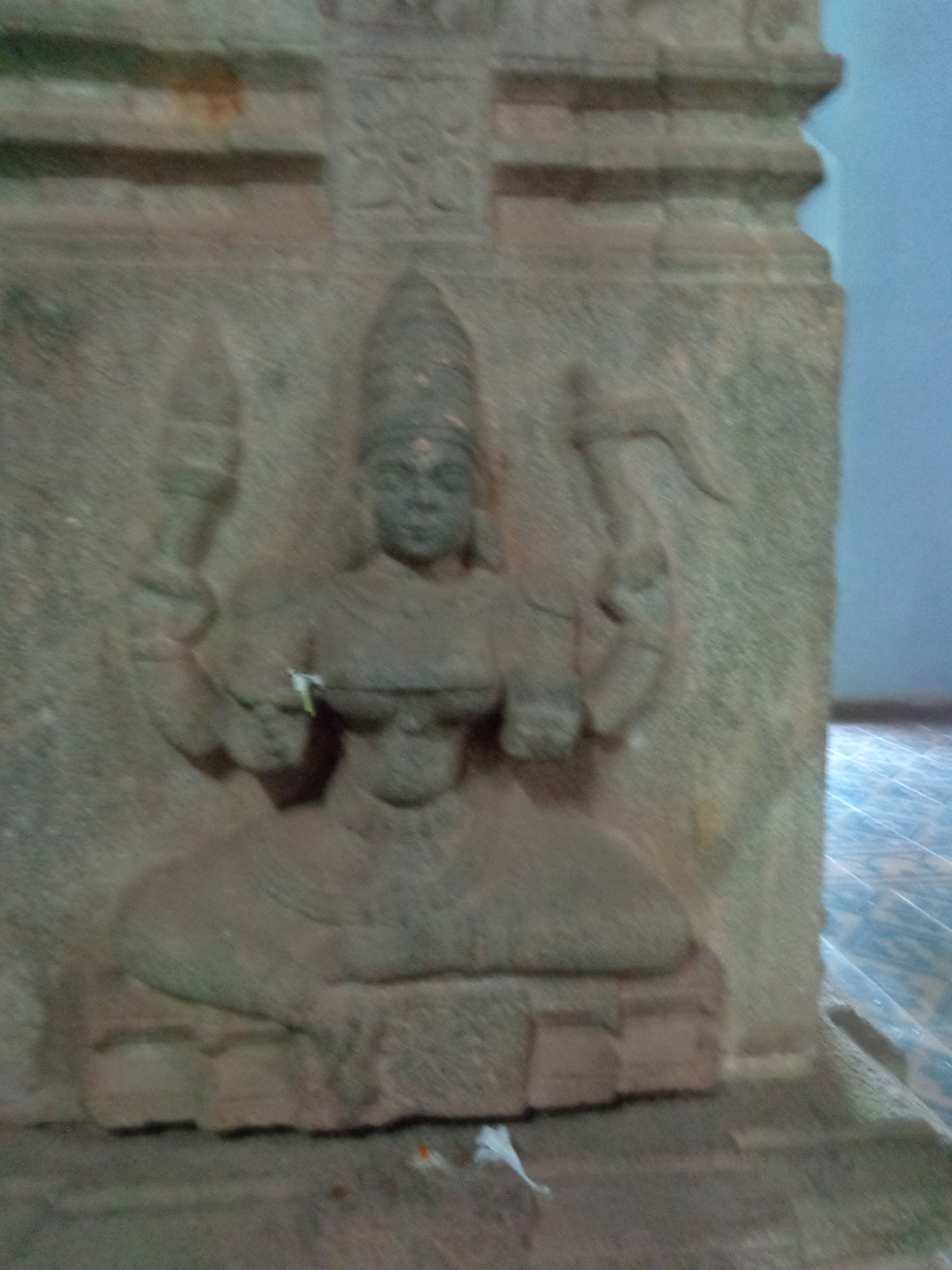
Rock-cut image of Goddess Saraswati

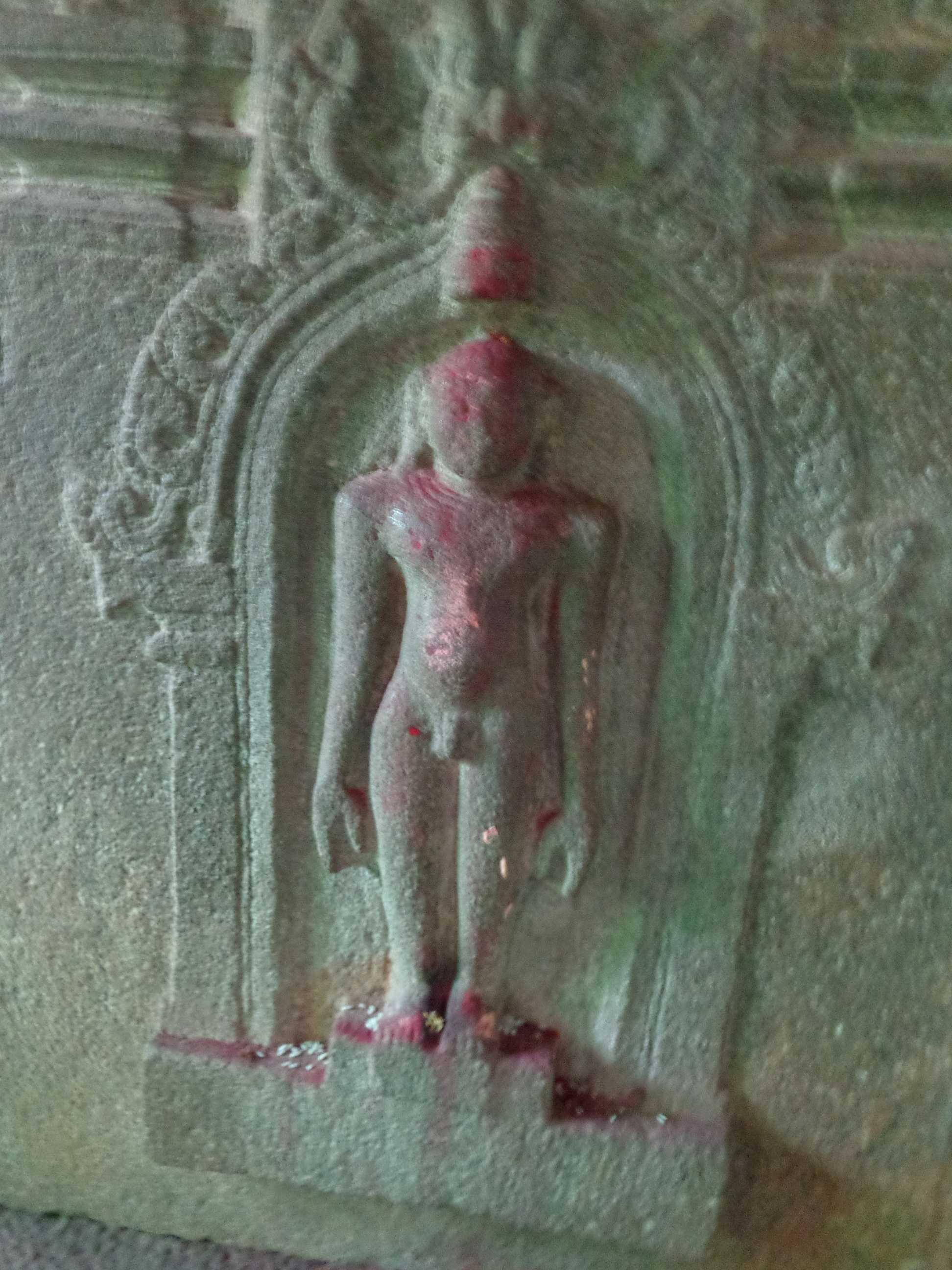
Image of Bahubali

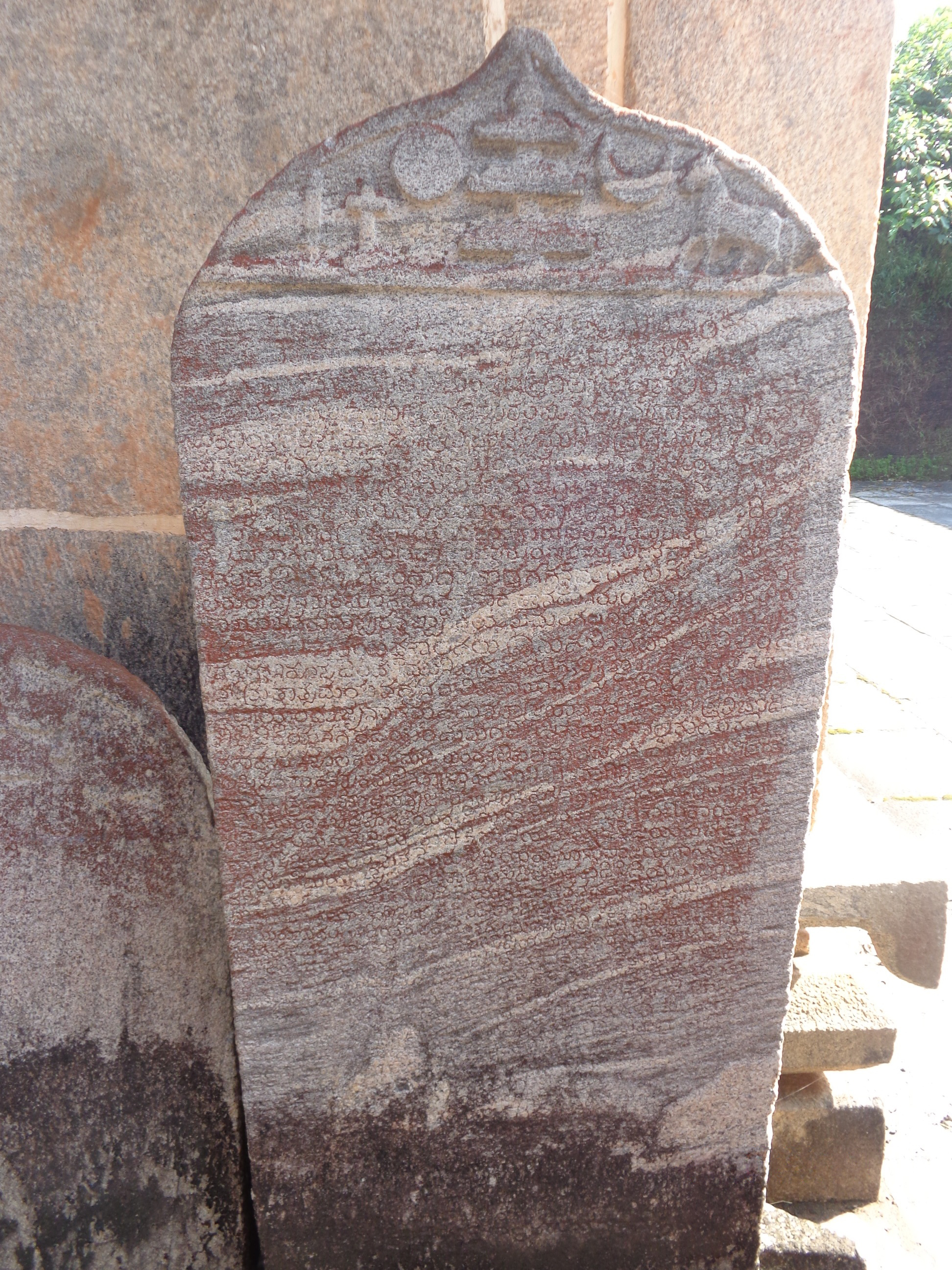
Inscription outside temple

== See also ==
- Jain Bunt
- Chaturmukha Basadi
- Saavira Kambada Basadi
