= Koti Basadi =

Jain temple in Karnataka, India

- ಕೋಟಿ ಶೆಟ್ಟಿ ಬಸದಿ
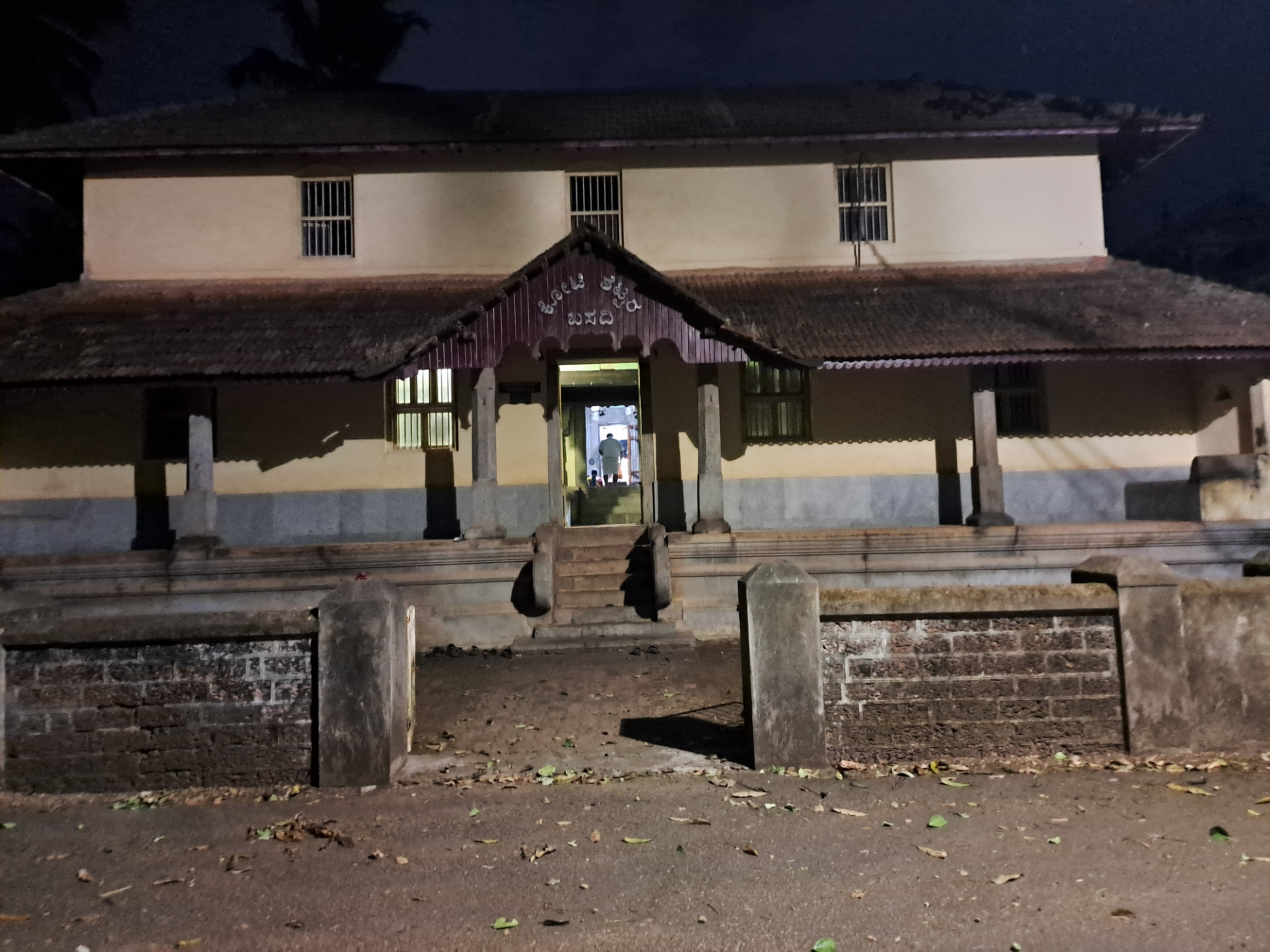
- Exterior view of Koti Basadi

Religion
- Affiliation: Jainism
- Deity: Neminatha
- Festivals: Mahavir Jayanti, Depavali
- Governing body: Shri Moodabidri Jain Matha

Location
- Location: Moodabidri, Karnataka
- Interactive map of Koti Basadi
- Coordinates: 13.0696°N 74.9975°E

Architecture
- Creator: Koti Shetty
- Established: 1401 C.E.
- Temple: 18

Koti Basadi (also known as Koti Shetty Basadi) is a Jain temple located in Moodabidri, Karnataka, India. It is one of the 18 major Jain temples in the region, known for its distinct architecture and historical significance associated with the merchant community of the 15th century.

== History ==
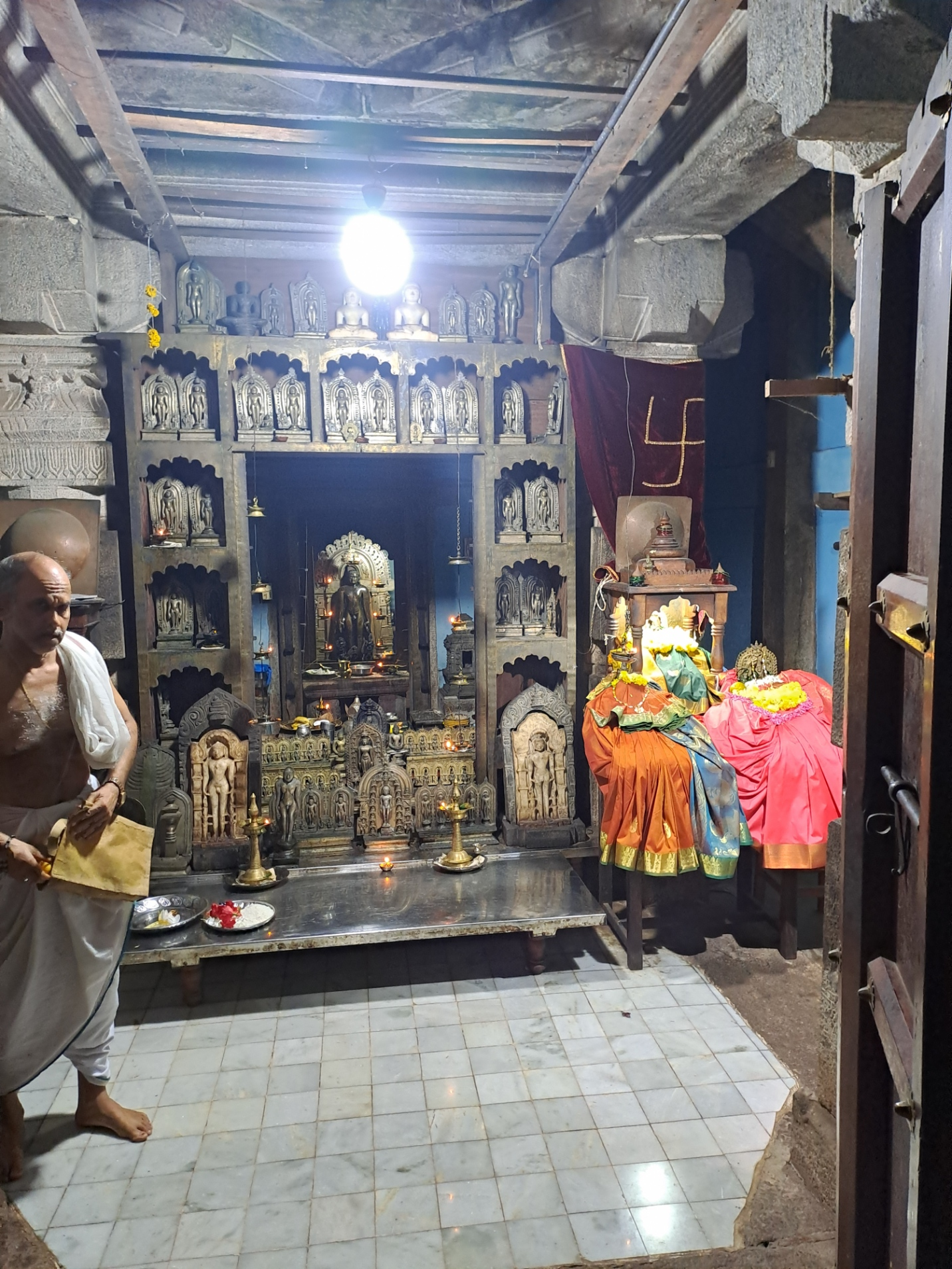
Idol of Tirthankara Neminatha

The Koti Basadi was built in 1401 A.D. by Koti Shetty, a prominent merchant from Betkeri. Koti Shetty was a trader who owned a fleet of ships and utilized them to conduct trade with distant regions, including China and Portugal. The temple is one of the eighteen major Jain Basadis in Moodabidri, which is known as the "Jain Kashi of the South". It was constructed during the Vijayanagara era influence in the region.

According to inscriptions, Koti Shetty built the temple based on the instructions of the religious teacher Shrutha Muni Bhattaraka. He was responsible for the installation of the presiding deity, Neminatha. The idol stands two and a half feet tall, carved from black stone and inlaid with bronze plates.

== Architecture ==
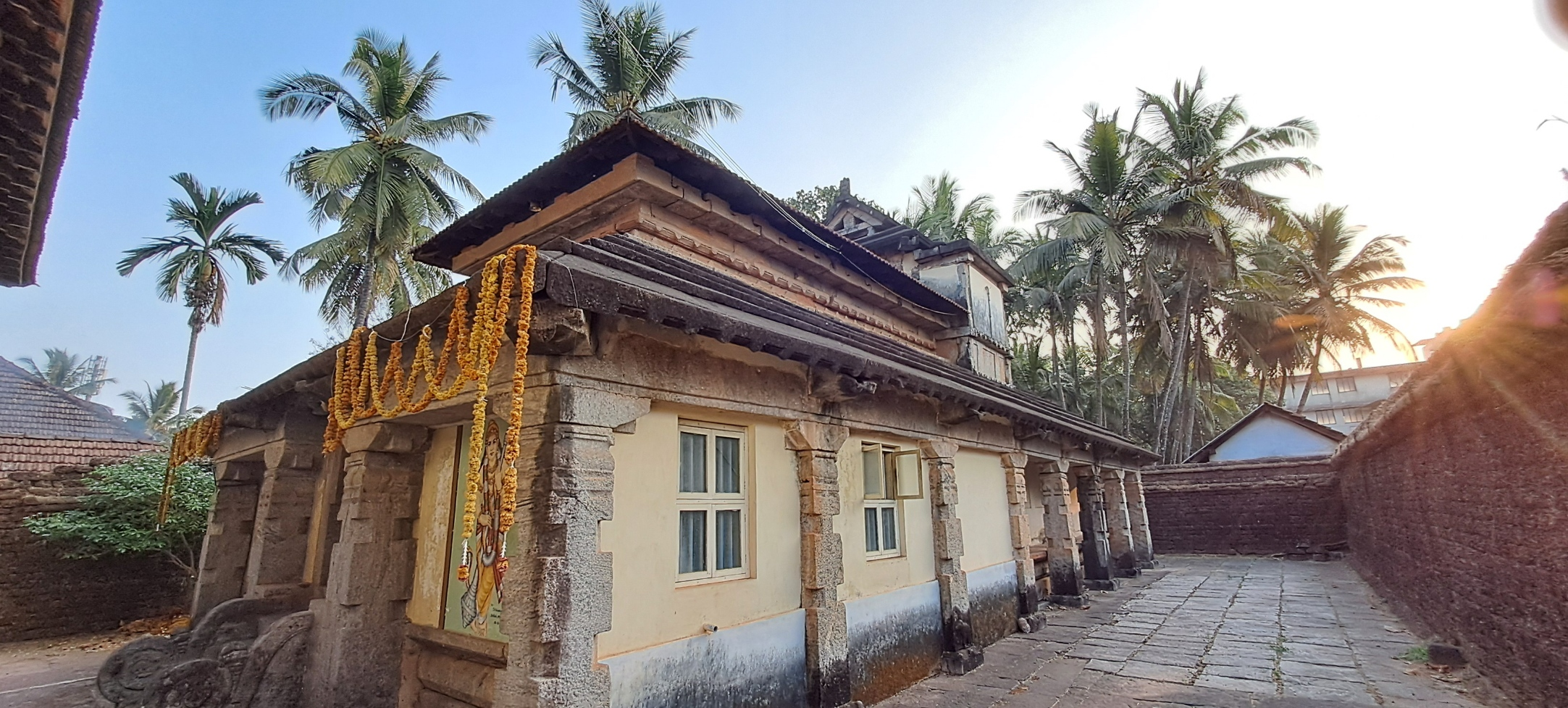
View of the temple structure

=== Entrance and Courtyard ===
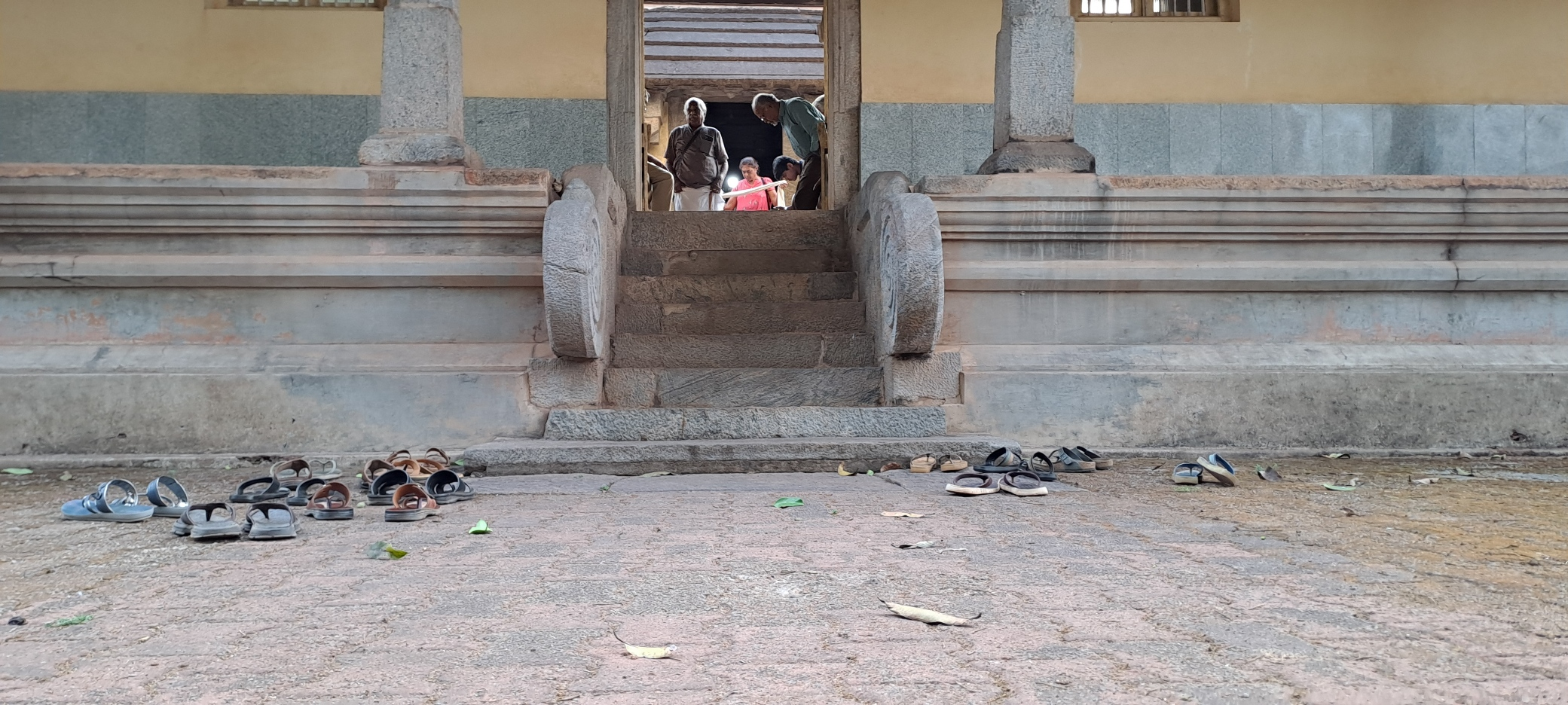
The outer entrance

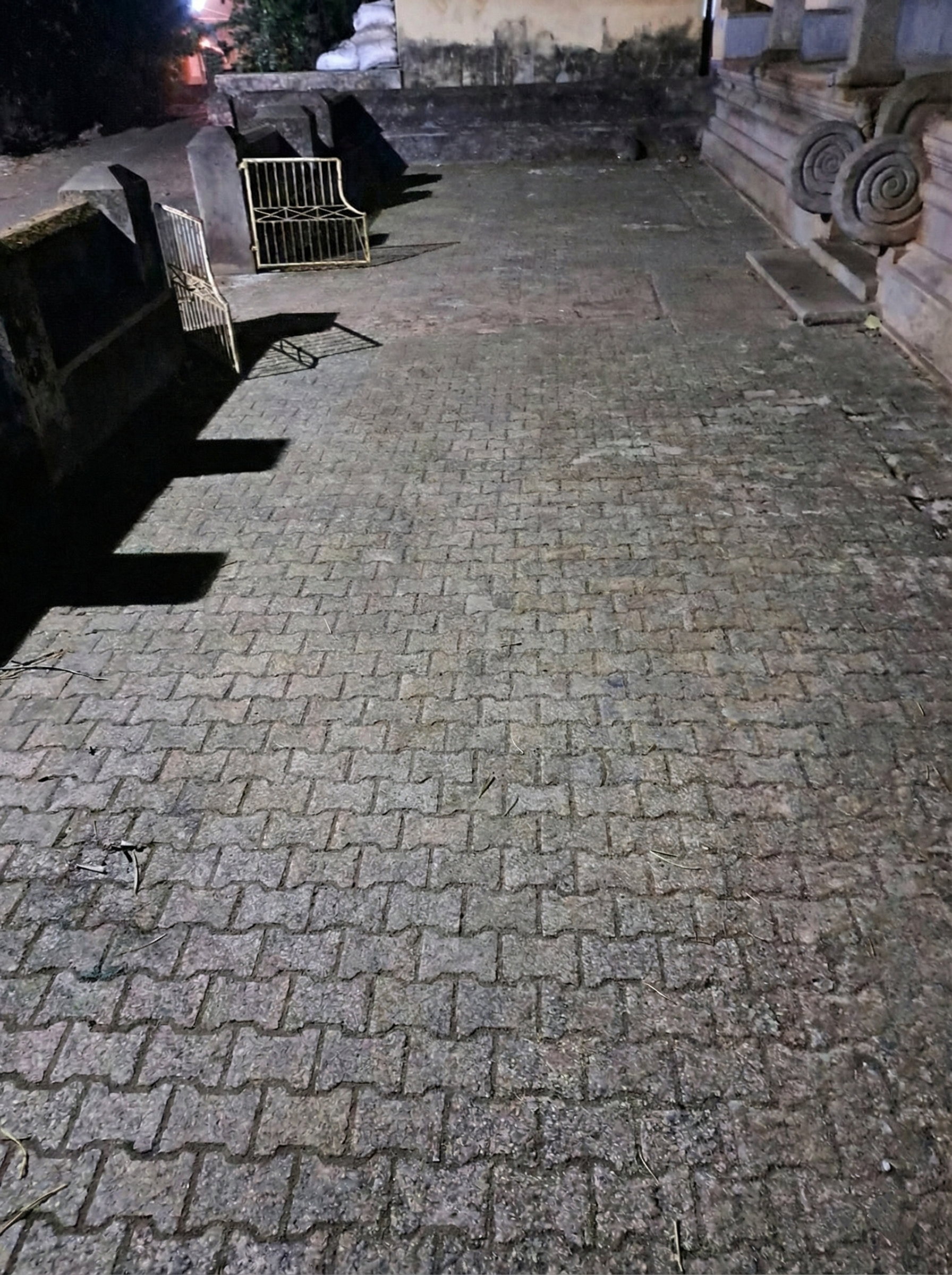
Yard outside Koti Shetty Basadi

The temple complex is entered through a main gate that opens into a yard. Beyond the yard lies an outer entrance leading to a passageway. This passage is 3 metres (9.8 ft) wide and features raised platforms on both sides.

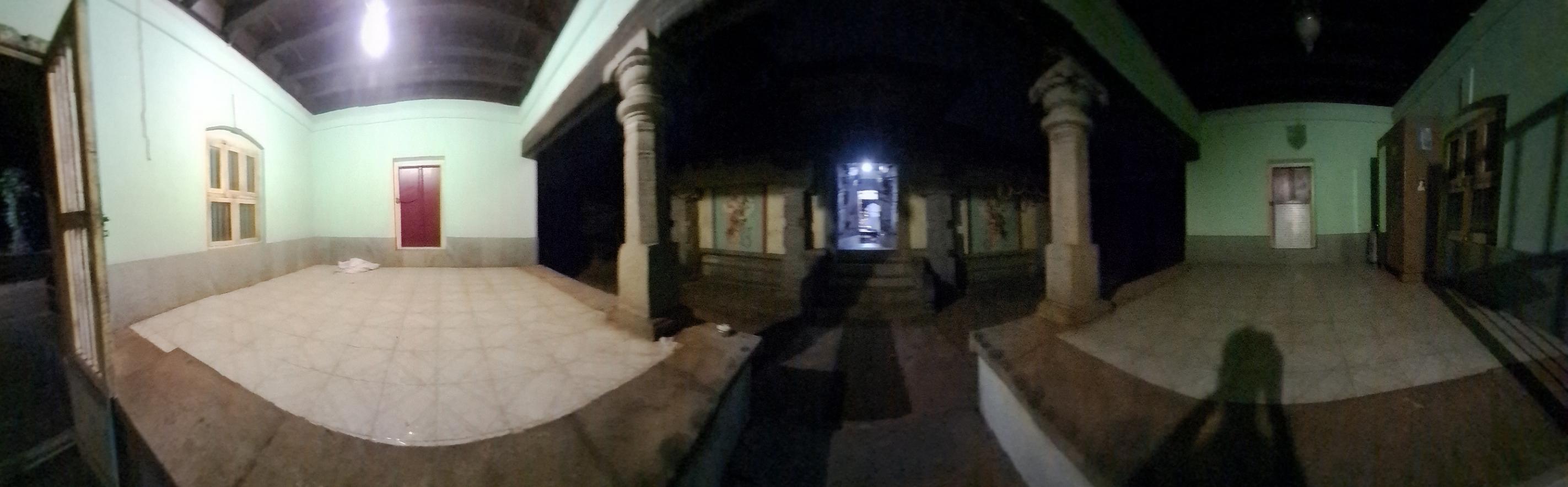
View of the inner courtyard entrance

The passageway leads to the outer courtyard, an open space that encircles the main temple structure, used for Pradakshina (circumambulation). In the back-left corner of the courtyard stands the Kshetrapala, along with Ashtanagakula Devathas.

=== Main Hall and Sanctum ===
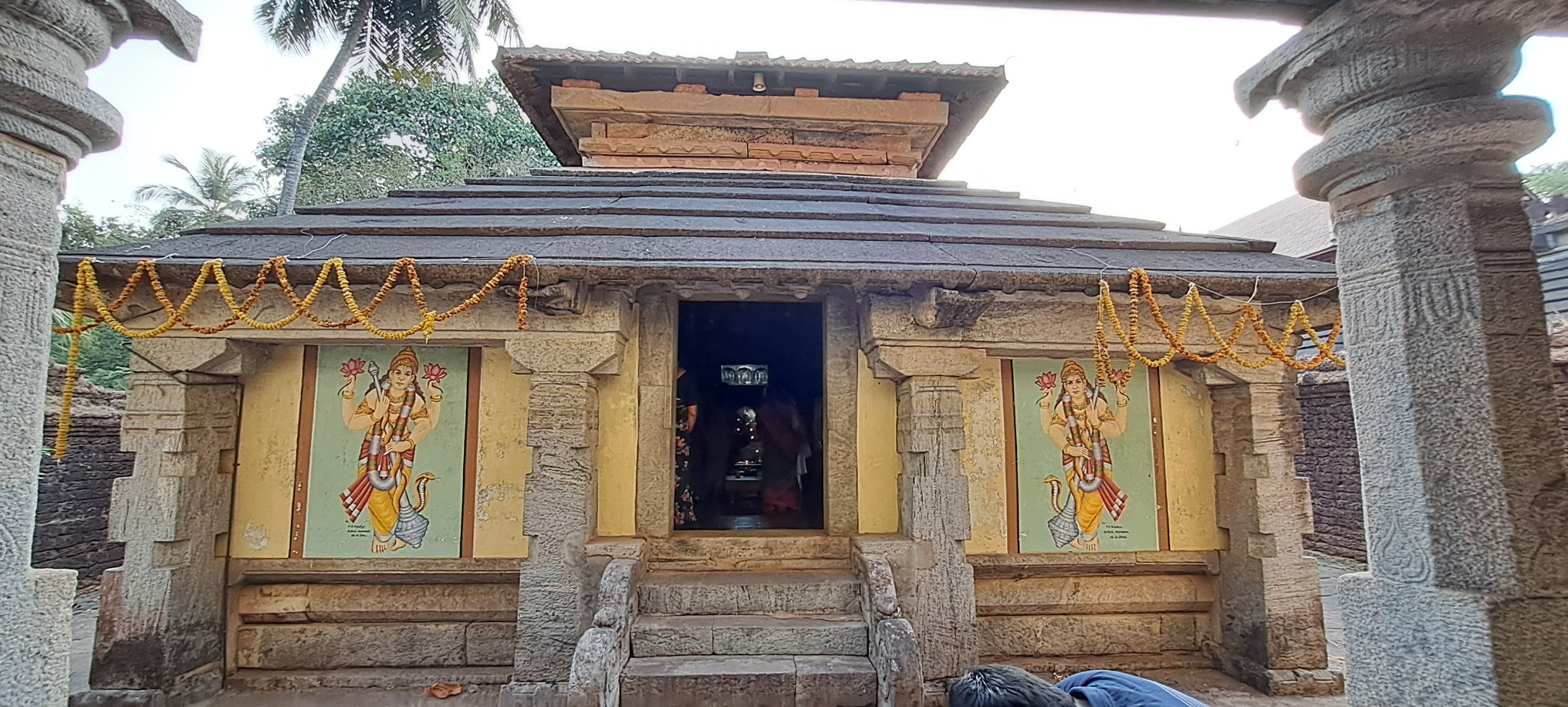
The main doorway

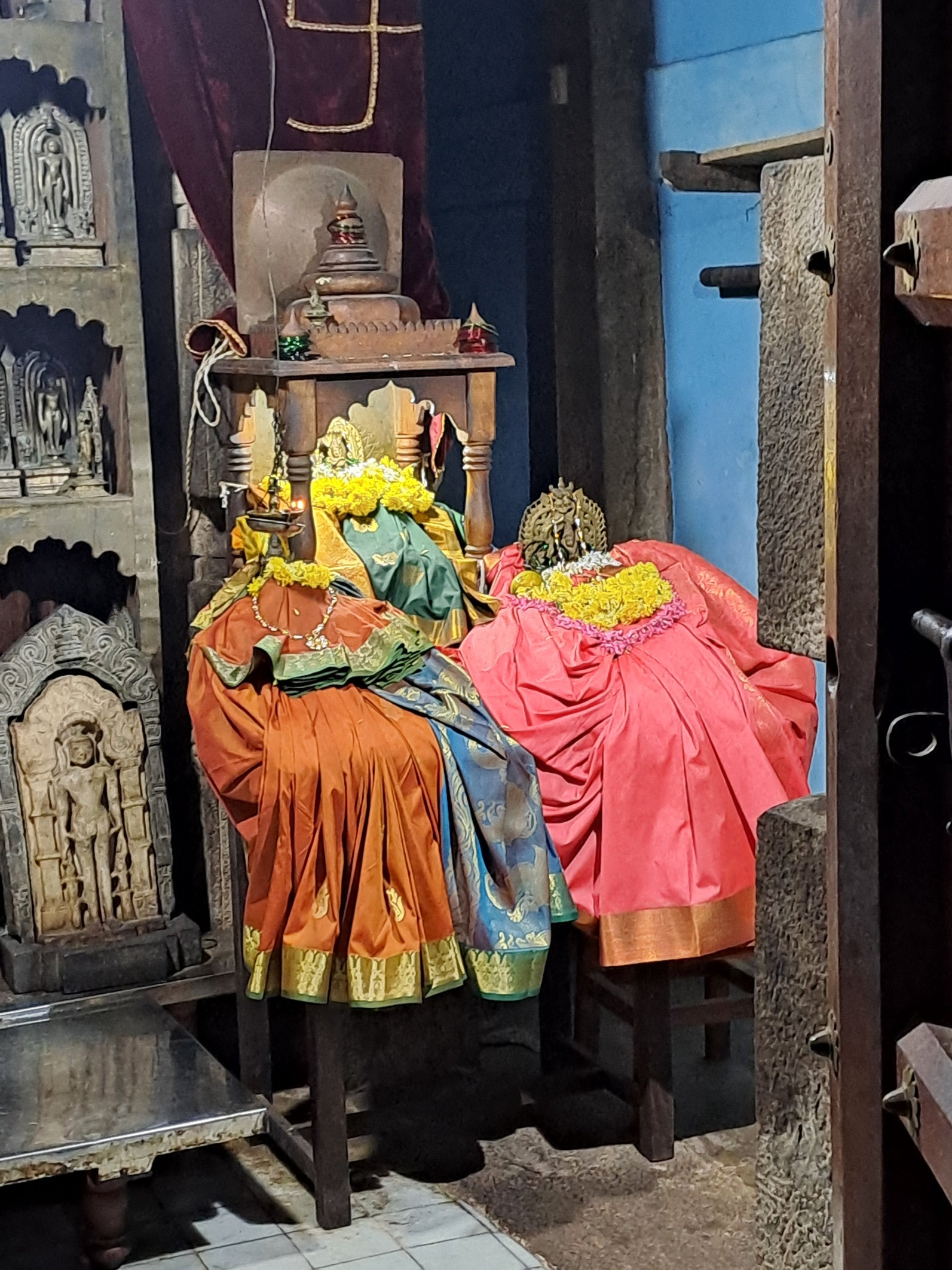
Idol of Goddess Padmavathi

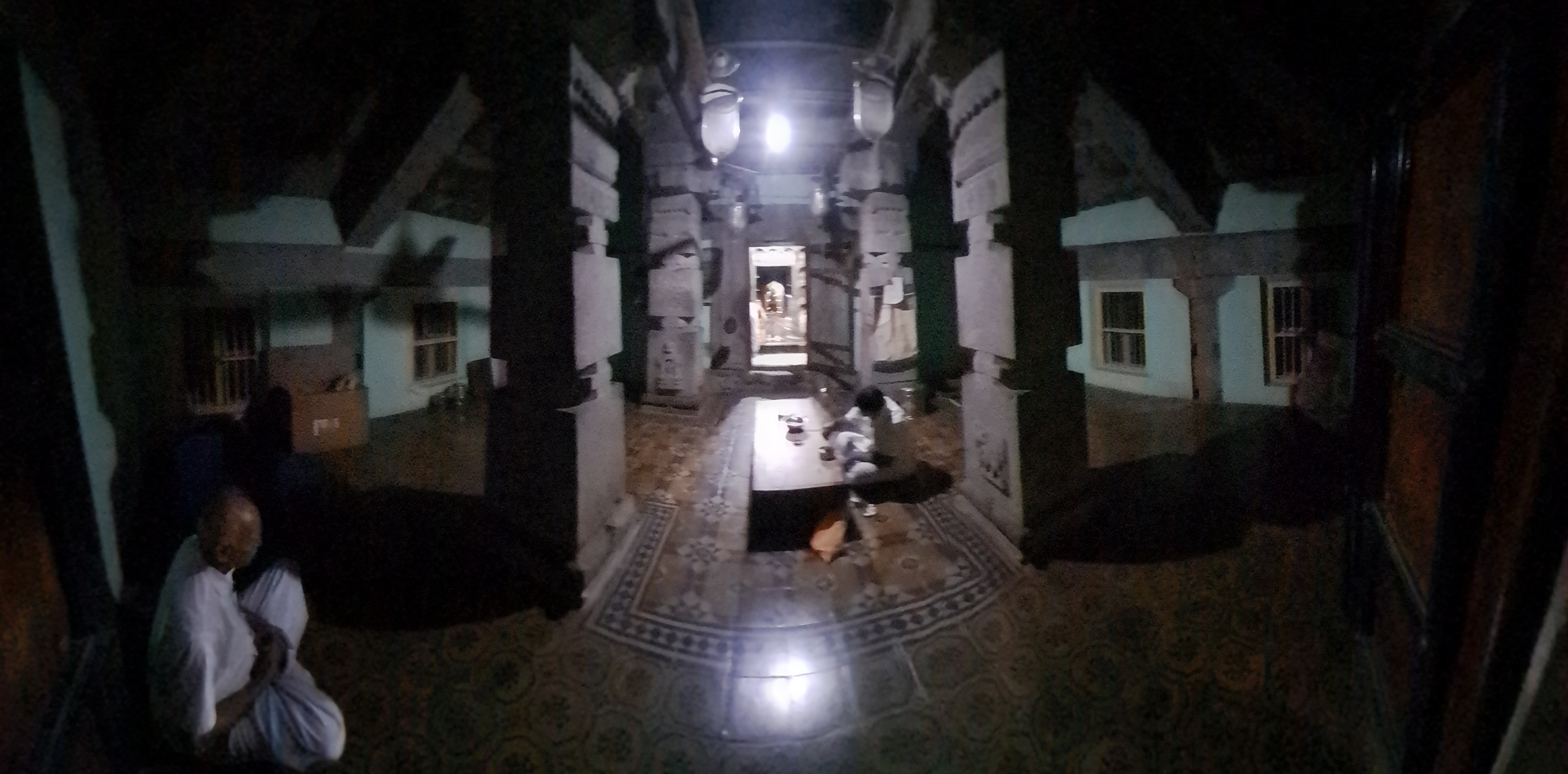
Inside the temple hall

The main doorway leads into the first hall (mantapa). Access to the inner sanctum is traditionally restricted to members of the Indra family. The sanctum houses the idols of the Tirthankara Naminatha and Goddess Padmavati.

== Location ==
The temple is located in the town of Moodabidri, which is accessible via road from Mangalore (approx. 34 km) and acts as a hub for Jain heritage sites in the Dakshina Kannada district.
