= Dharmanatha =

15th Tirthankara in Jainism in current cycle of Jain cosmology

- 15th Jain Tirthankara
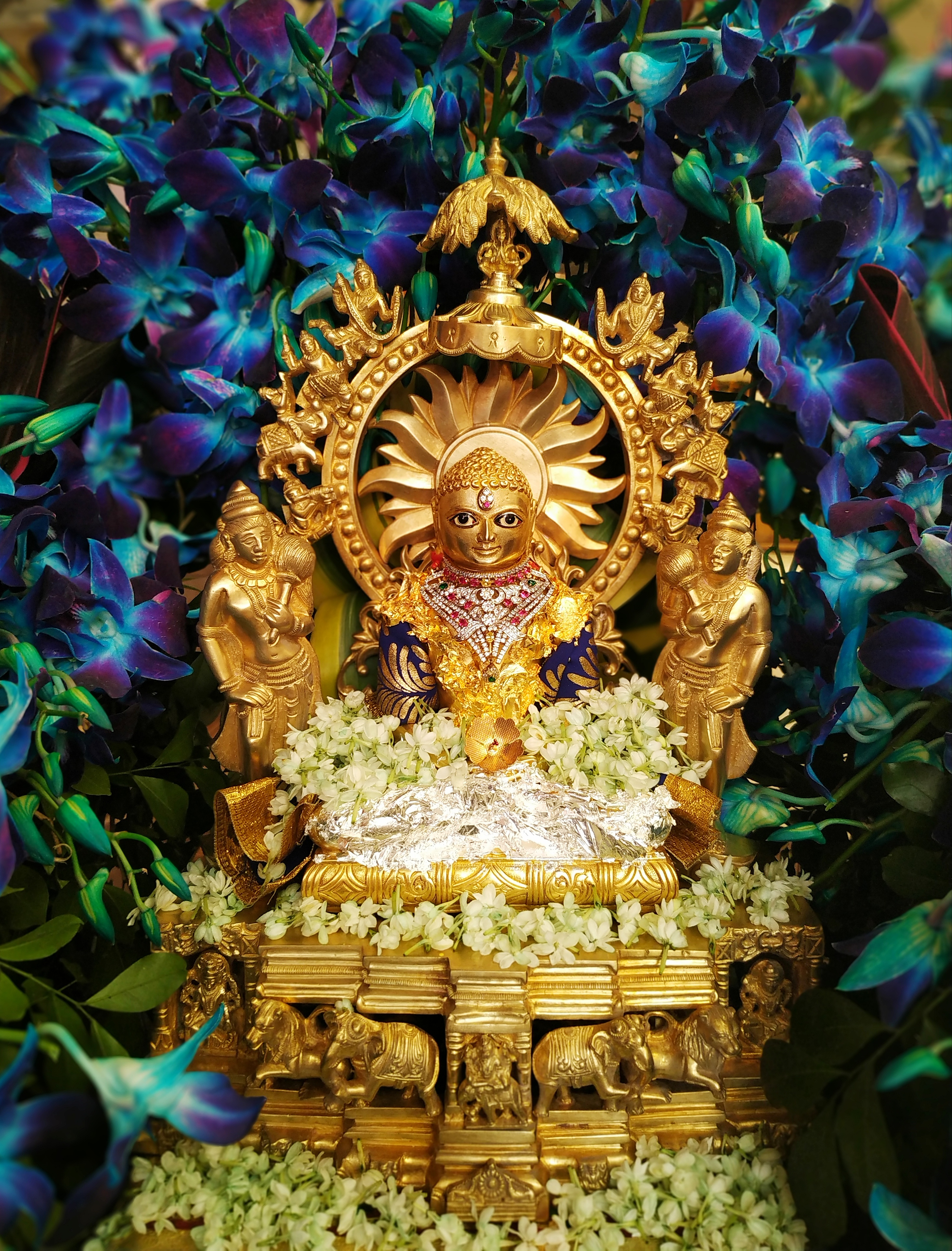
- Lord Dharmanatha at Gruh jinalay, Kolkata, West Bengal, India
- Venerated in: Jainism
- Predecessor: Anantanatha
- Successor: Shantinatha
- Symbol: Vajra
- Height: 45 bows (135 meters)
- Age: 2,500,000 years
- Color: Golden

Genealogy
- Born: Ratnapuri
- Died: Sammed Shikhar
- Parents: Bhānu (father); Suvratā (mother)
- Dynasty: Ikṣvākuvaṁśa

Dharmanatha was the fifteenth Jain Tirthankara of the present age (Avasarpini). According to Jain beliefs, he became a siddha, a liberated soul which has destroyed all of its karma. Dharmanath was born to King Bhanu Raja and Queen Suvrata Rani at Ratnapuri in the Ikshvaku dynasty. His birth date was the third day of the Magh Sukla month of the Indian calendar.

Hutheesing Jain Temple, located at Ahmedabad in Gujarat, constructed in 1848 AD, is dedicated to him.

== Life and legends ==
According to traditional Jain accounts, Dharmanatha is revered as the 15th tirthankara of the current cosmic age (avasarpini). Jain universal history states that he was born into the ancient Ikshvaku dynasty to King Bhanu and Queen Suvrata in the city of Ratnapuri, India. His birth is traditionally celebrated on the third day of the Magha Shukla month of the lunisolar Jain calendar. Within the expansive framework of Jain cosmology, texts attribute to him a symbolic lifespan of 2,500,000 years and a towering physical height of 45 bows (dhanushas). After a period of ruling his kingdom, traditional narratives describe him renouncing worldly attachments and political power to become an ascetic, eventually attaining omniscience (Kevala Jnana). Like many of his spiritual predecessors, he ultimately achieved liberation from the cycle of rebirth (moksha) on the sacred peaks of Mount Shikharji (Sammed Shikhar) in modern-day Jharkhand.

Dharmanatha is said to have been born 4 sagara after his predecessor, Anantanatha. His successor, Shantinatha, is said to have been born 3 sagara less 3/4 palya after him.

== Iconography ==
Dharmanatha is conventionally depicted in a sitting or standing meditative posture. The distinguishing emblem of this tirthankara is a thunderbolt (vajra), which allows worshippers to accurately identify his idols. In traditional Jain descriptions, Dharmanatha is consistently associated with a golden physical complexion.

== Famous Temple ==
As the 15th tirthankara, Dharmanatha is the primary deity of several architecturally and culturally significant temple complexes across the Indian subcontinent.

=== Places of birth and liberation ===
Marking the geographic site of his final liberation, the peaks of Mount Shikharji house a dedicated shrine (tonk) enshrining his footprints, which remains a major pan-Indian pilgrimage destination.

=== Other temples ===
In western India, the Hutheesing Jain Temple in Ahmedabad, Gujarat, stands as one of the most prominent monuments dedicated to his worship. Constructed in 1848 CE during a severe famine by the wealthy merchant Hutheesing family, this spectacular two-storied white marble temple is celebrated for its intricate stone carvings and features Dharmanatha as its primary enshrined deity (moolnayak).

In southern India, the Kochi Jain temple located in Mattancherry, Kochi (Kerala), serves as a crucial spiritual and cultural anchor for the regional Gujarati Jain diaspora. Built in 1904, it stands as a highly significant center of Jain worship and mercantile history in the deep south of the subcontinent.

== Gallery ==
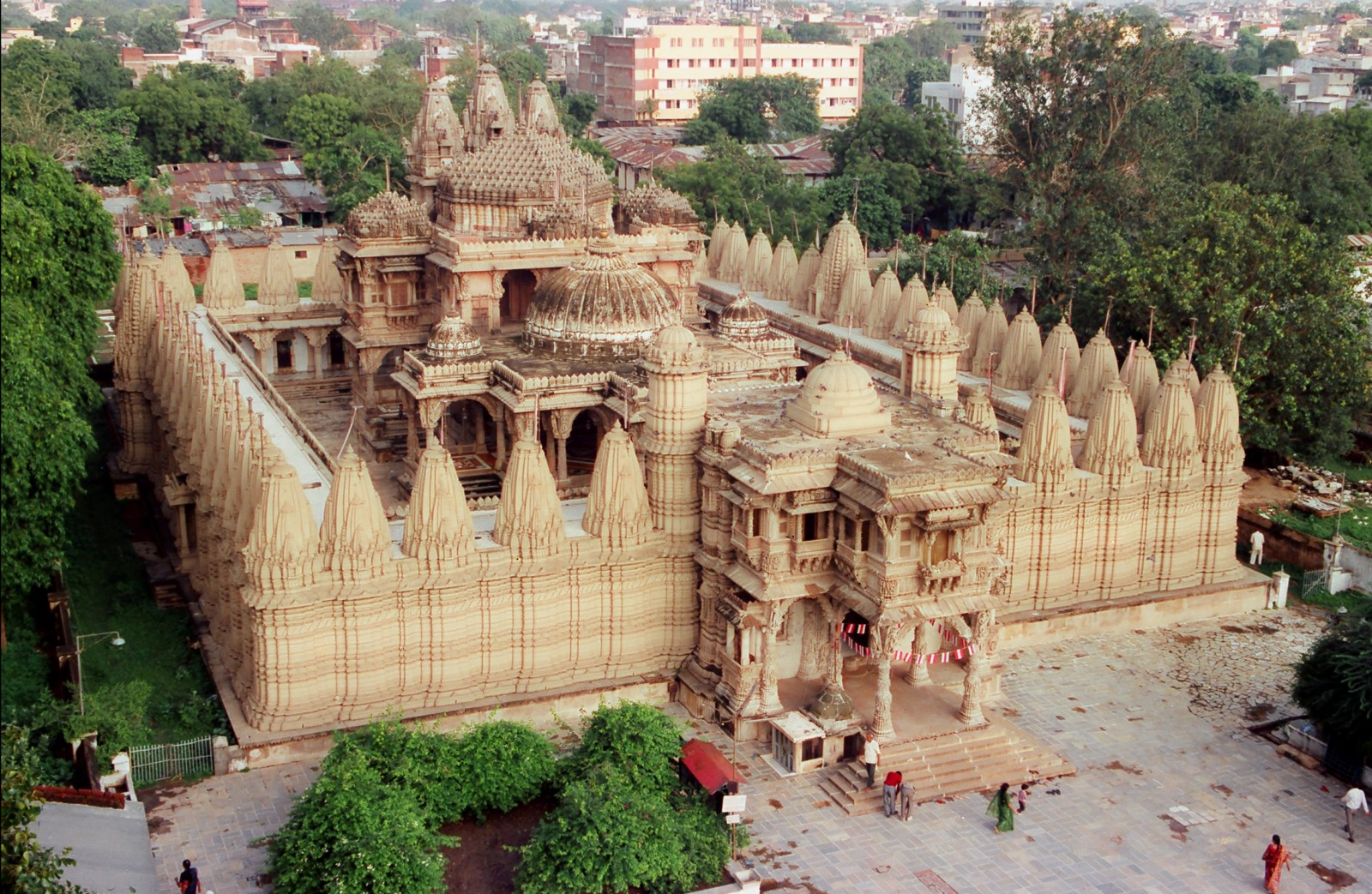
Hutheesing Jain Temple with 52 devakulikas

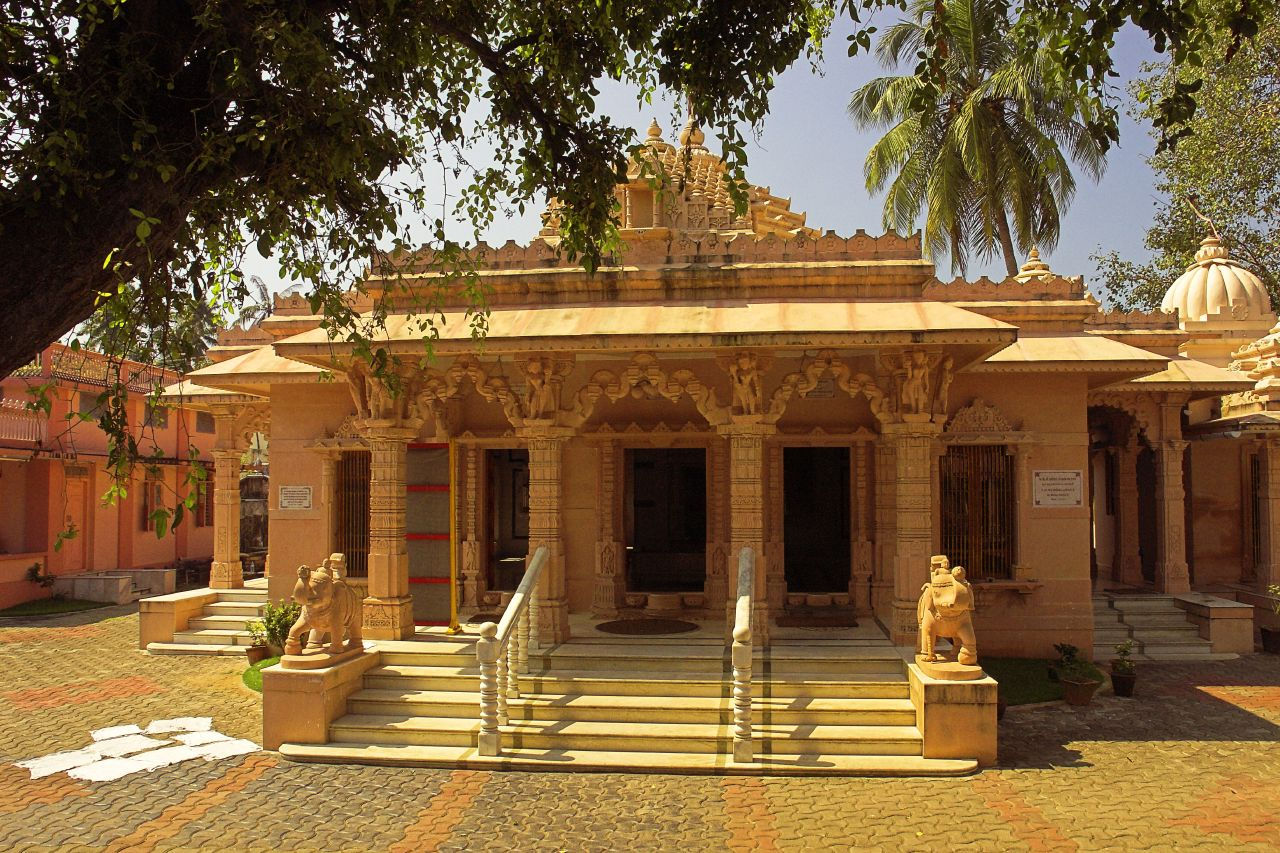
Dharmanath Jain temple in Mattancherry, Kochi

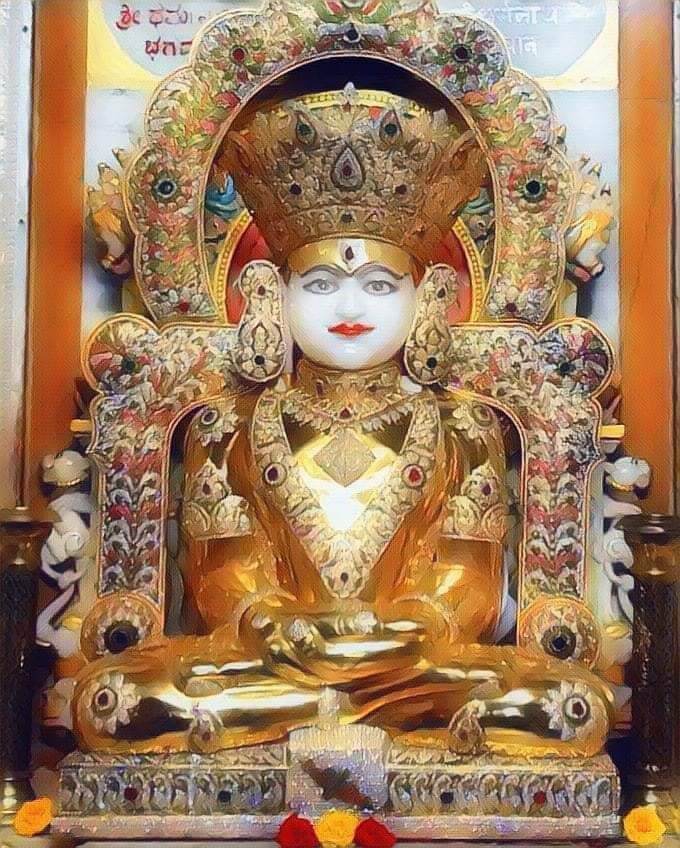
Dharmnatha Prabhu at Jayanagar Bengaluru

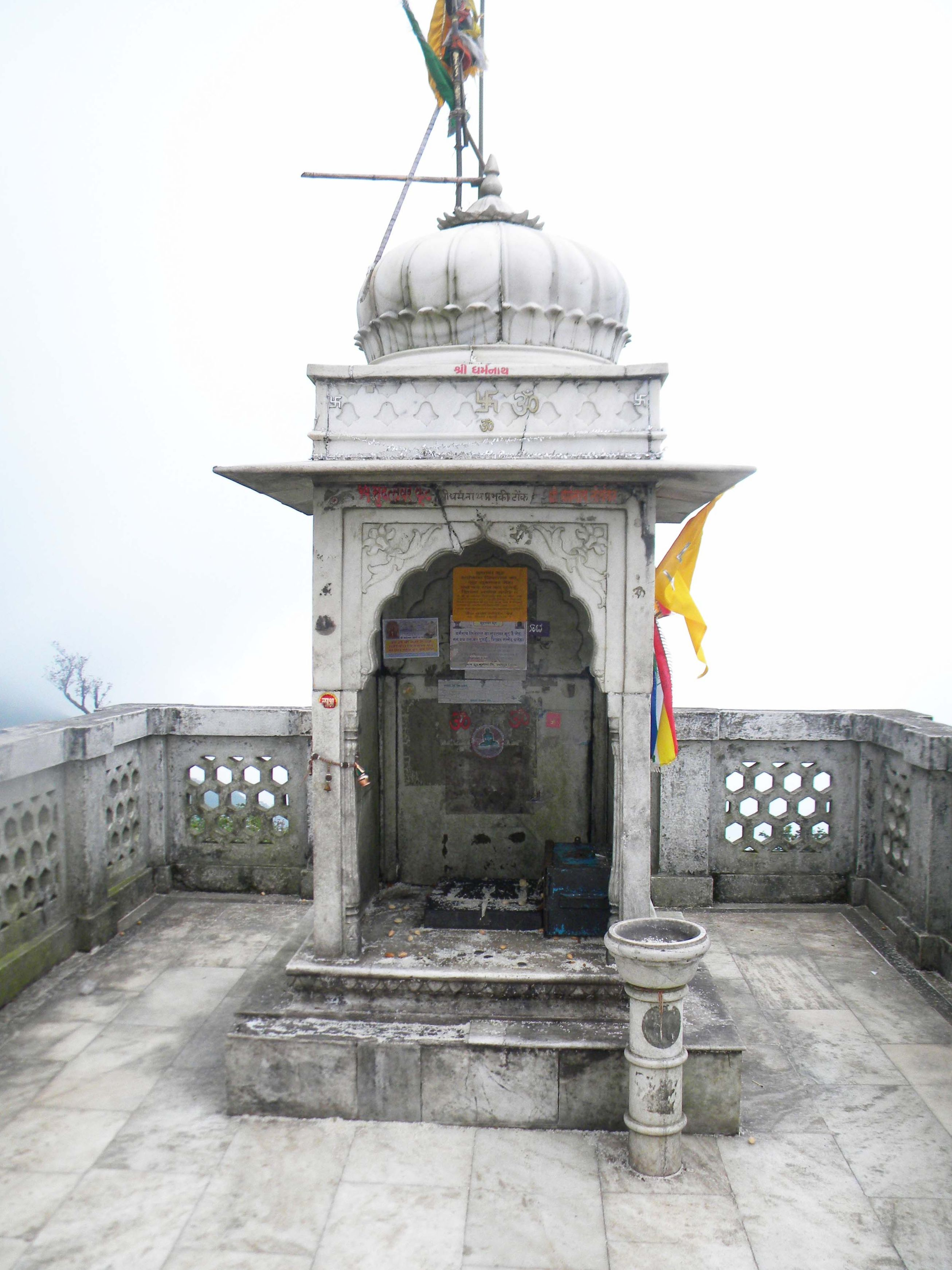
Dharmanath Tonk, Shikharji

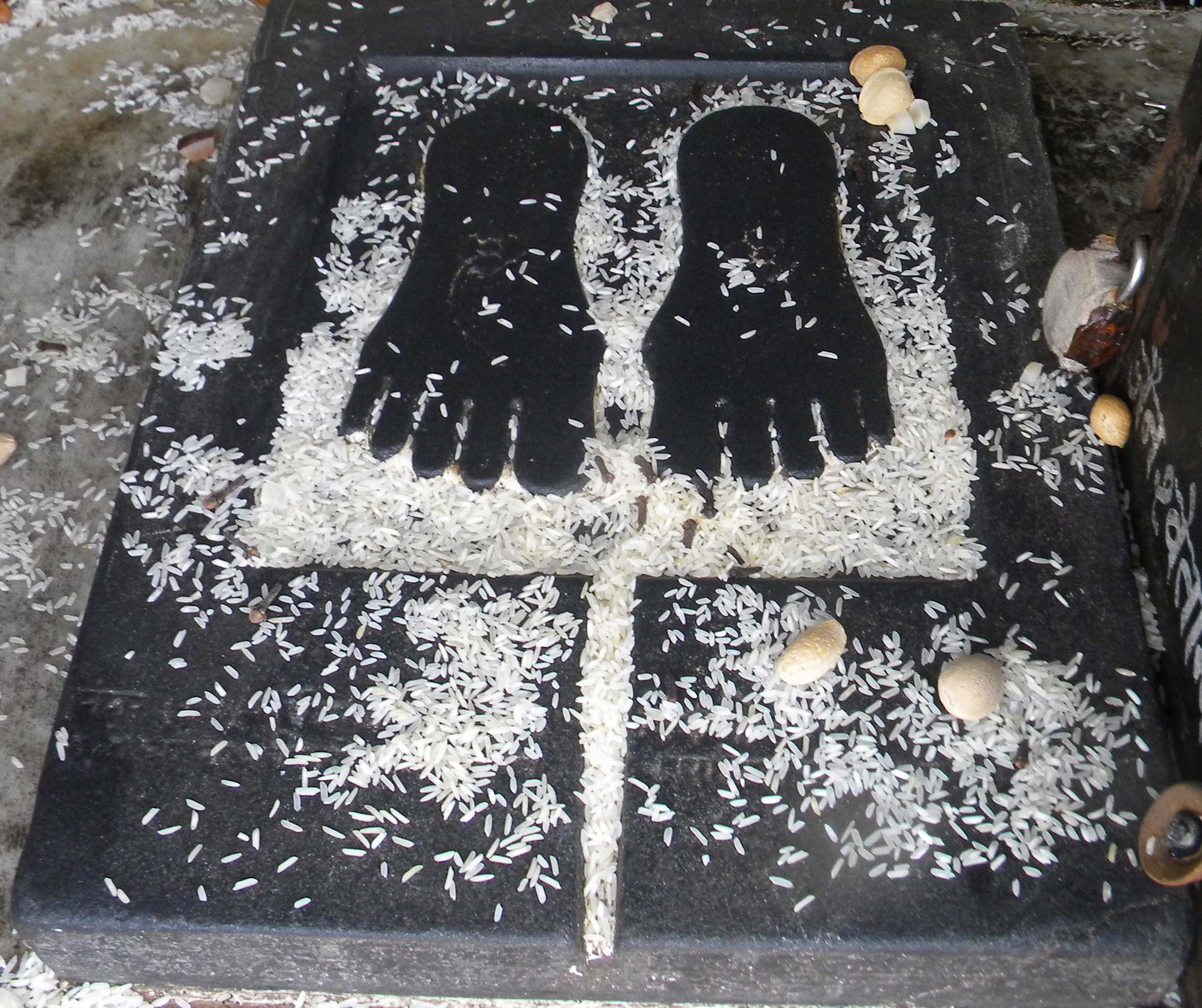
Footprint at Dharmanath Tonk, Shikharji

== See also ==
- God in Jainism
- Arihant (Jainism)
- Jainism and non-creationism
