= Ratnapuri, India =

Ratnapuri is a place in Uttar Pradesh, India.

It is the birthplace of the Jain Tirthankara Dharmanath and is a temple town in Uttar Pradesh. It is located on the Ayodhya-Lucknow national highway 24 km west of Ayodhya near Ronahi.

== Jain Temple ==
There are two major temples in this area one belongs to the Digambar sect and other belongs to the Shwetambar sect of Jainism. Shwetambar temple is known as Shri Jain Shwetambar Ratnapuri Teerth Pedhi. Digambar temple is known as Shri Jain Digambar Ratnapuri Teerth Pedhi.
