= Jainism in Kerala =

External videos
- Documentary on Jainism in Kerala
- Documentary on Jain temples in Kerala

Jainism, one of the three most ancient Indian religious traditions still in existence, has very small presence (0.01%) in Kerala, in south India. According to the 2011 India Census, Kerala only has around 4500 Jains, most of them in Wayanad and Ernakulam districts.

Medieval Jain inscriptions are mostly found on the borders of Kerala proper, such as in Wayanad in the north-east, Alathur in the Palghat Gap and Chitharal in Kanyakumari district. Epigraphical evidence suggests that the shrine at "Thirukkunavay", perhaps located near Cochin, was the major Jain temple in medieval Kerala (from c. 9th century CE). The so-called "Rules of the Tirukkunavay Temple" provided model and precedent for all other Jain temples of Kerala.

Some of the Jain temples in Kerala were incorporated by the Hindus at a later stage. The temple images are worshiped as Hindu gods and considered as part of the Hindu pantheon. Hindus and Jains occasionally worship their deities in the same temple in Kerala.

== History ==
=== Late medieval to early modern Kerala ===
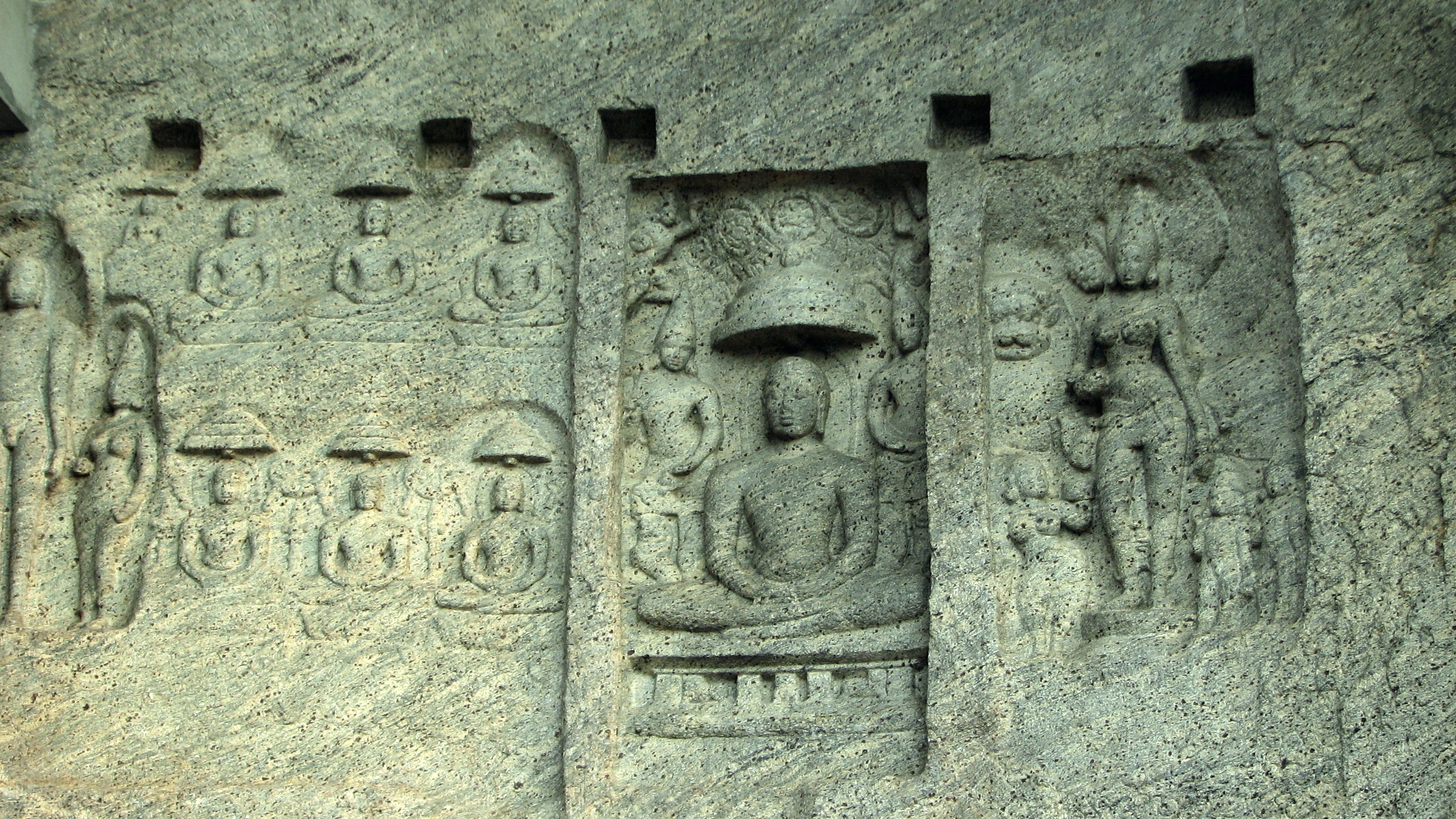
Images of Mahavira, Devi and Parsvanatha in Chitharal Temple, Kanyakumari

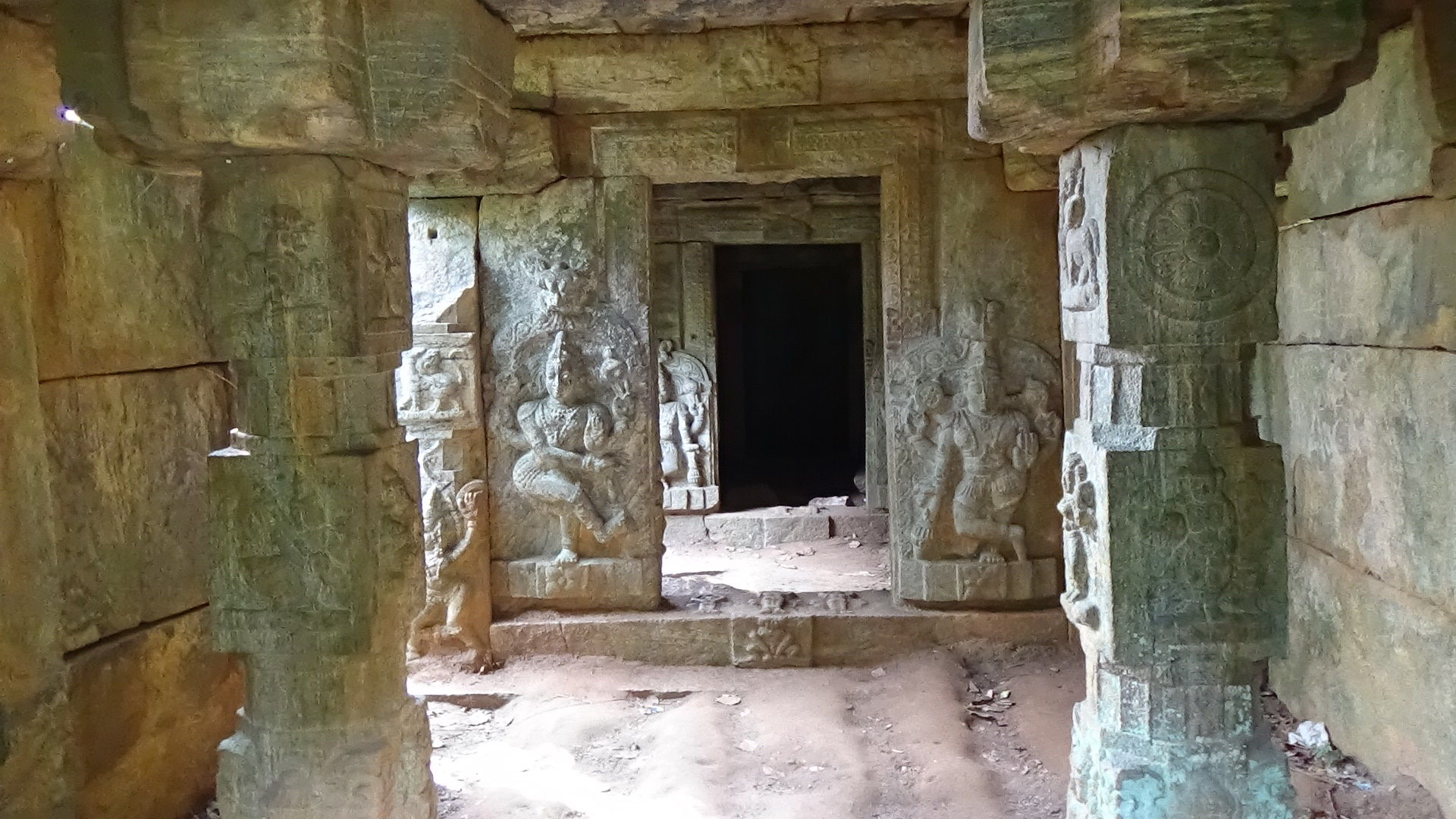
Interior of Jain temple, Wayanad

Ilamko Atikal, who is traditionally credited as the author of the Tamil epic Chilappatikaram, was probably a resident of a Jain vihara known as "Kunavayir kottam". Some scholars identify Kunavayir kottam with Tirukkunavay[il] or Trikkana Matilakam, now known as Matilakam, a village near Cochin. Matilakam was also known as "Gunaka" and "Kunaka" in the medieval period (Kokasandesa, slokas 45-48). Archaeological excavations conducted at Matilakam in 1970, revealed an 8th-9th century CE foundation, structurally different from the standard Hindu temple foundations in shape.

Whether it was the same as the kottam at Kunavay or not, epigraphical evidence suggests that the shrine at Tirukkunavay was the major Jain temple in Kerala. It is assumed that the so-called "Rules of the Tirukkunavay Temple" provided model and precedent for all other Jain temples of medieval Kerala. A dating system known as the Tirukkunavay Era was also present during this period.

Inscriptions mentioning the Tirukkunavay

- Tiruvannur/Tirumannur Inscription: royal order of the Chola emperor Rajaraja I (c. 1044 CE), from Tiruvannur Temple, near Calicut (the temple is a now Siva temple)
- Alathur (Godapuram) Inscription (c. 11th century) - Images of Mahavira with the Gandharvas, and Parsvanatha have been recovered from Alattur.
- Talakkavu Inscription: from Talakkavu in Putadi, Wynad (dated in the 137th year of the Tirukkunavay Era ~ dated to c. 850 CE). The location of the Jain temple is now lost to the scholars.
- Kinalur Inscription (1083 CE) - connects Kota Ravi "Vijayaraga" (c. 883 - 913 CE), the Chera king at Kodungallur, with "Kunvay-Nallur". The location of the Jain temple is now lost to the scholars.

Based on the Talakkavu Temple Inscription, it is calculated that the Tirukkunavay Temple was founded some time at the close of the 7th or the beginning of the 8th century CE. It seems that by 15th century, the Tirukkunavay Temple was transformed to a Siva temple (Kokasandesa, slokas 47-48). The deity of Kunaka is called "Purari" in the poem Kokasandesa. The location of the temple is now lost to the scholars (the temple was probably destroyed completely in late medieval period).

The Chathurmukha Basati, Manjeshwar near Bengere traces its history to patronage to Jainism given by a jain dynasty present in the region in 12th century. This temple got modified to present stature in late 18th century.

Other Hindu temples in Kerala with Jain characteristics are

- Kallil, Perumbavoor - Images of Mahavira, and Padmavati (worshiped as the Bhagavati) and Parsvanatha can be found in the temple.
- Paruvasseri, Peechi (Palliyara Kavu Bhagavati Temple)
- Kaviyoor Guha Kshetram, Pathanamthitta district, Bhagavati Temple, Tiruccanattu Malai, Chitharal, Kulithura - Images of Mahavira, Devi (destroyed) and Parsvanatha can be found in the temple.

=== Jainism in modern Kerala ===
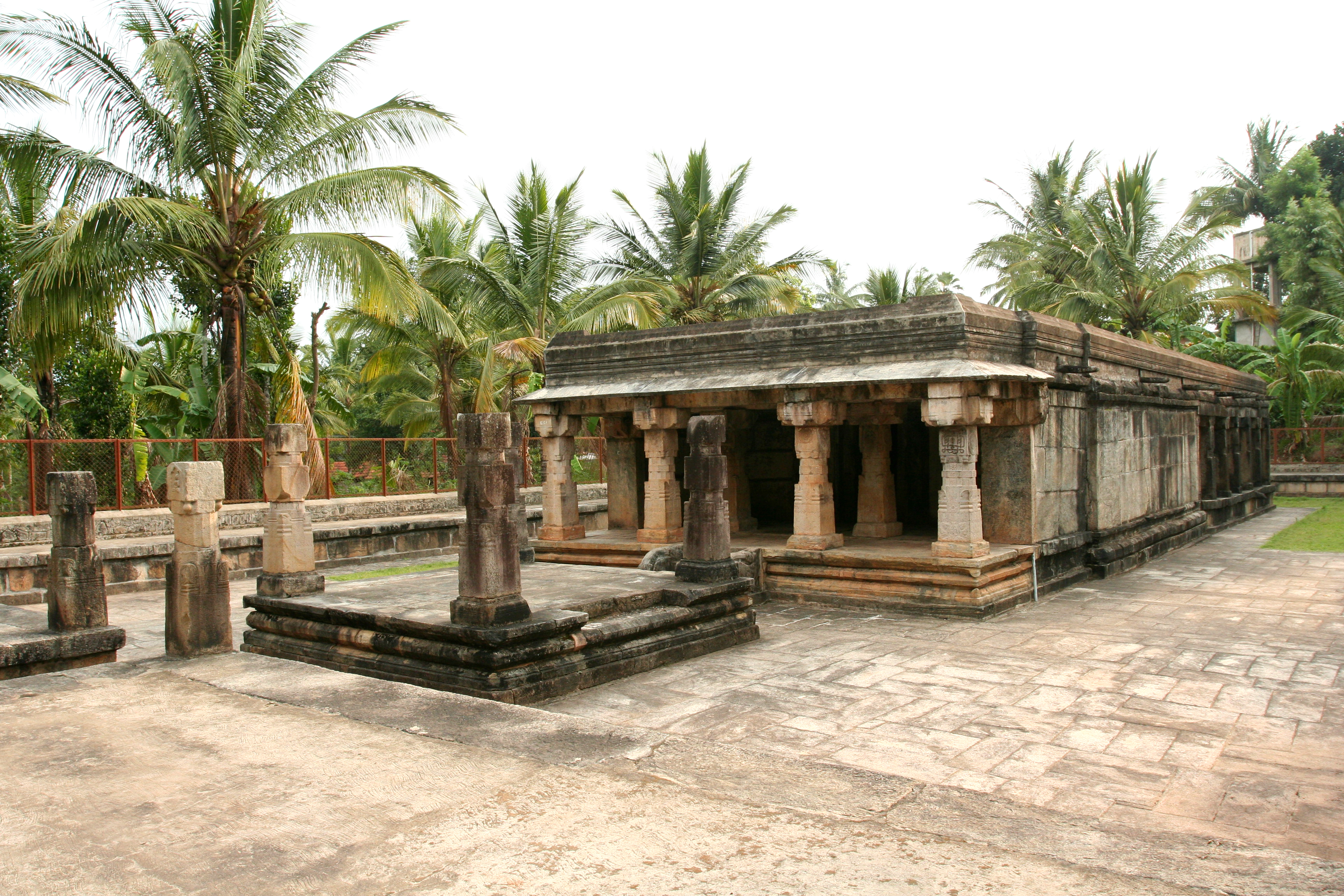
Jain Temple, Kidanganad

Some Jain shrines from early historic and medieval times still remain, notably in Jainamedu, near Vadakkanthara, Palghat, and in Sultan Battery in Wayanad. Koodalmanikyam Temple in Irinjalakuda is believed to have been a Jain temple. The assumption is that it was dedicated to Bharateswara, a digambara Jain monk. Some Jain temples located in modern-day Kerala are: Anantnath Swami Temple (Puliyarmala Jain Temple) in Puliyarmala, outside Kalpetta; Jain Temple, Kidanganad, Wayanad; Jainimedu Jain Temple; Kattil Madam Temple; Jain temple, Alappuzha; Kallil Temple in Perumbavoor; Kochi Jain temple, Mattancherry; Shri Vasupujya Swami Jain Temple, Srinivasa Mallan Road, Kochi; Cochin Digambar Jain Mandir, Panampilly Nagar, Kochi; Chathurmukha Basati, Manjeshwar; and Parswanatha Basati, Manjeshwar.

== Photo gallery ==
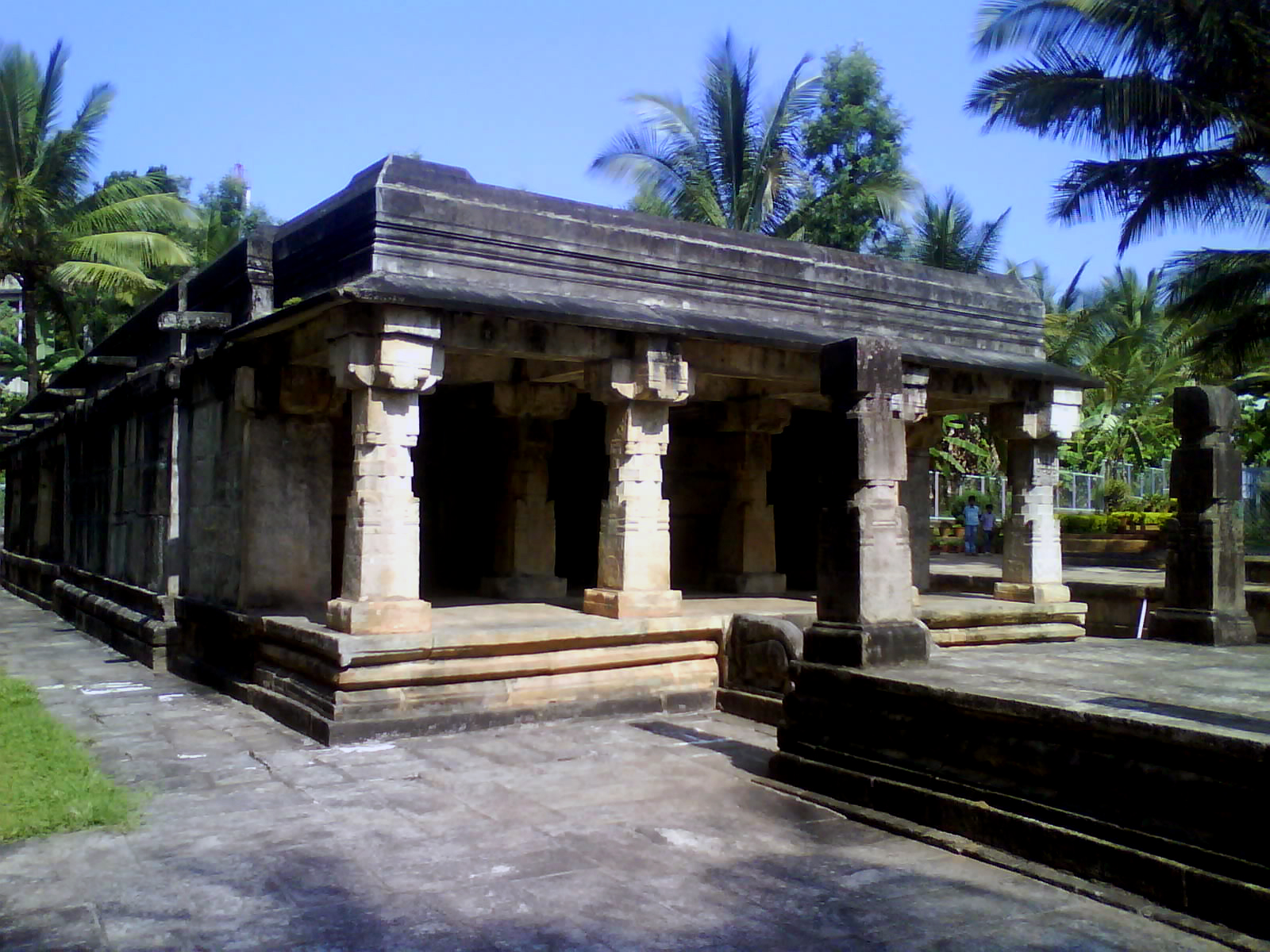
Anantnath Swami Temple

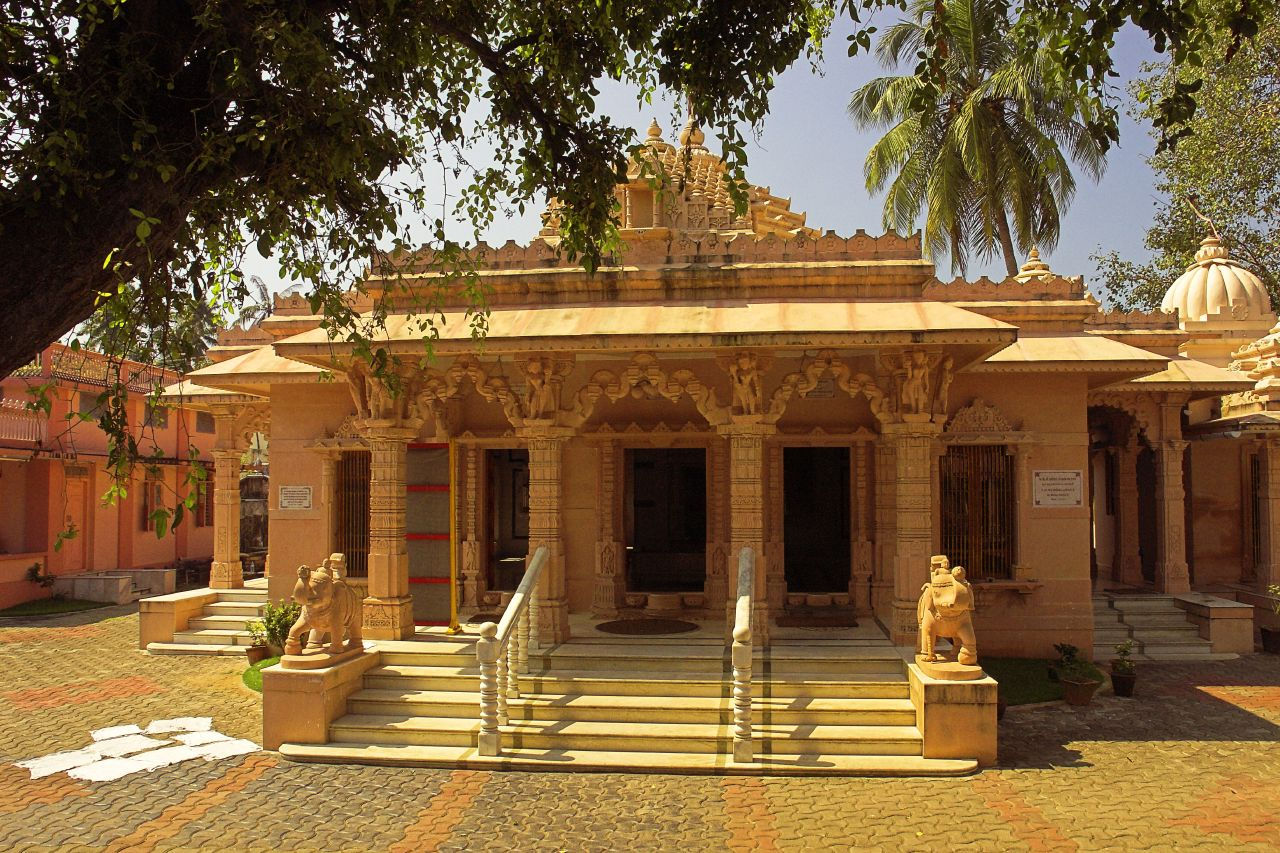
Kochi Jain temple in Mattancherry, Kochi

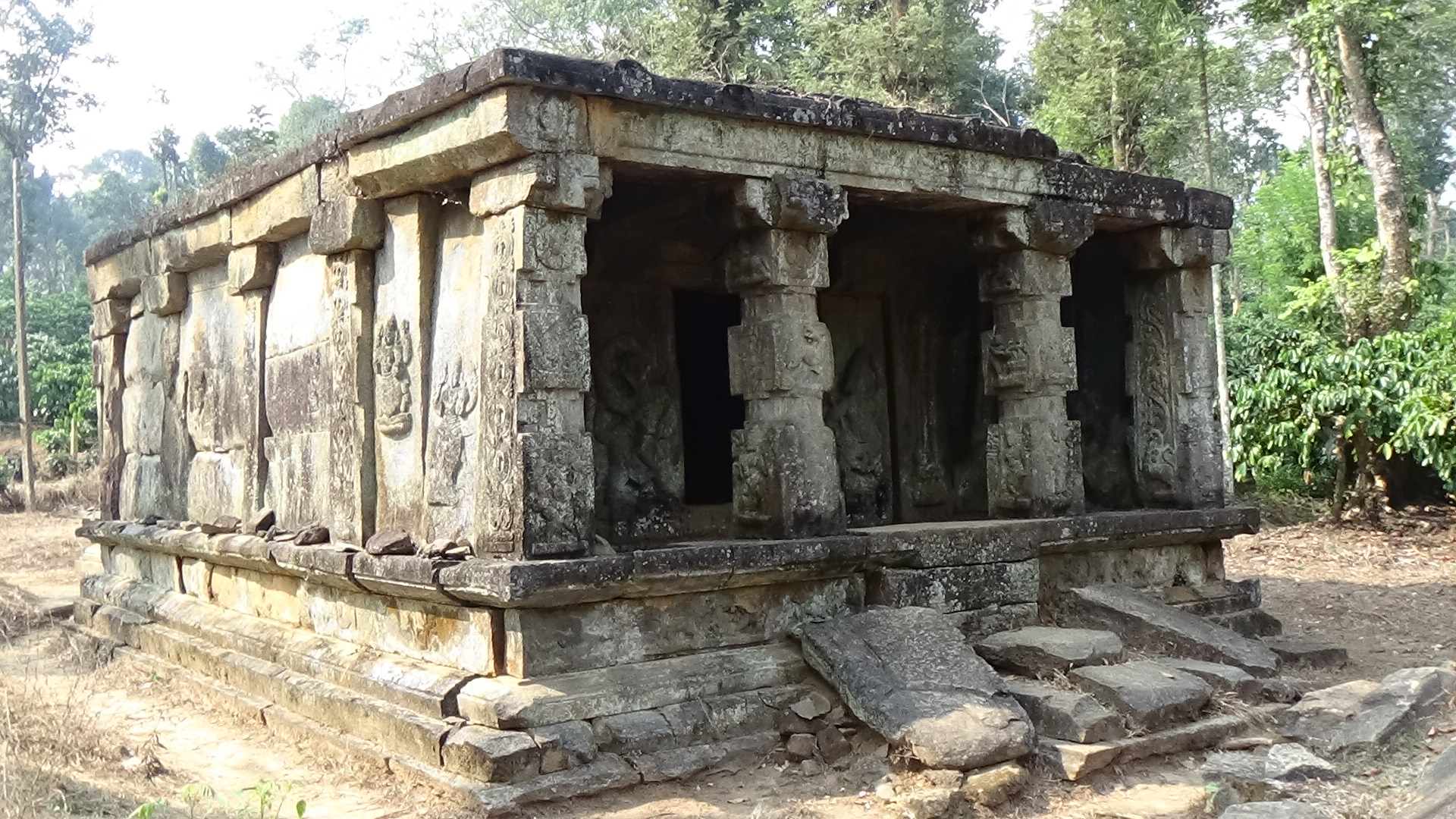
Visnugudi Basadi Jain Temple, Panamaram

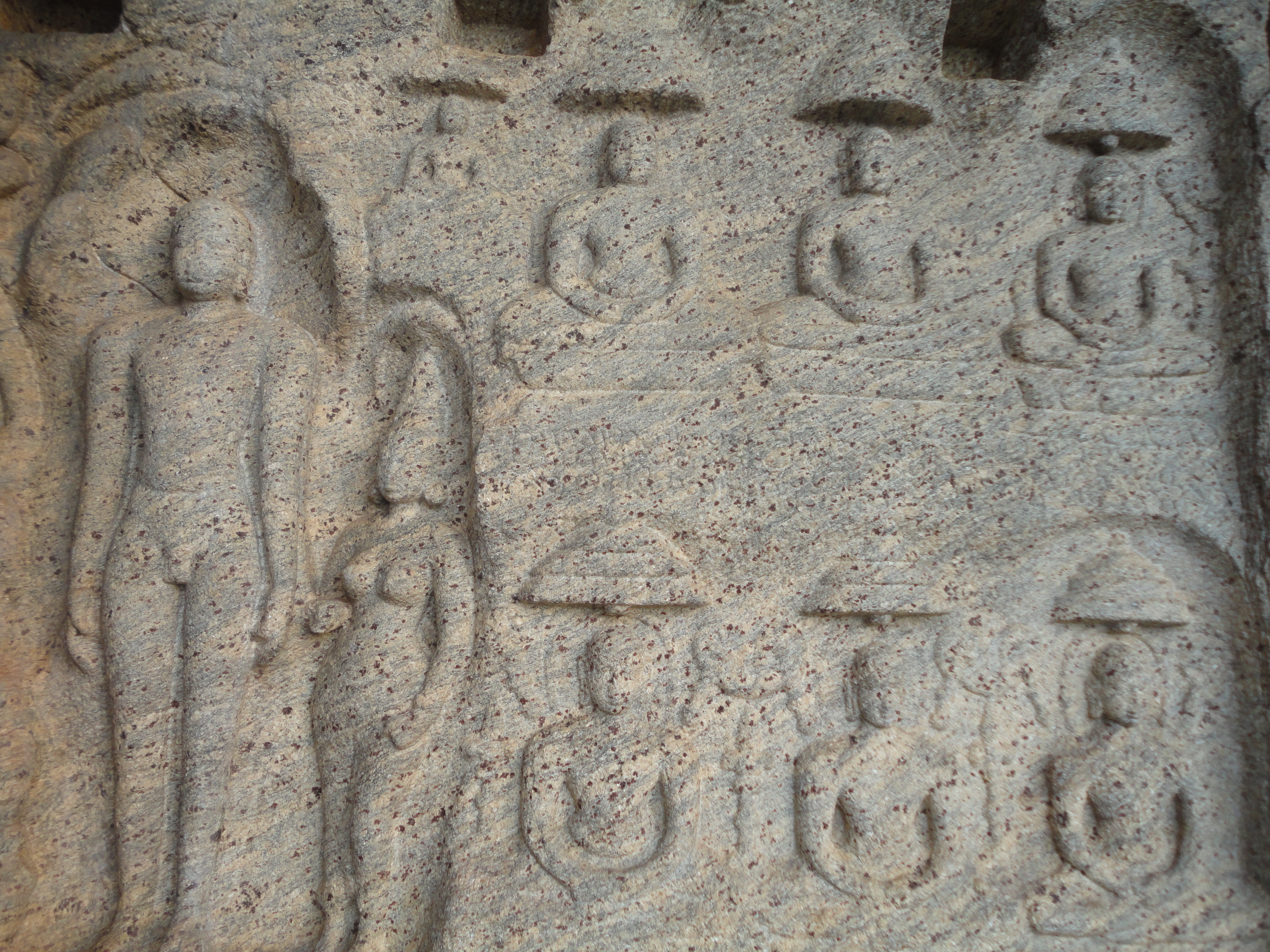
Jain art & carvings at Chitharal Jain Temple

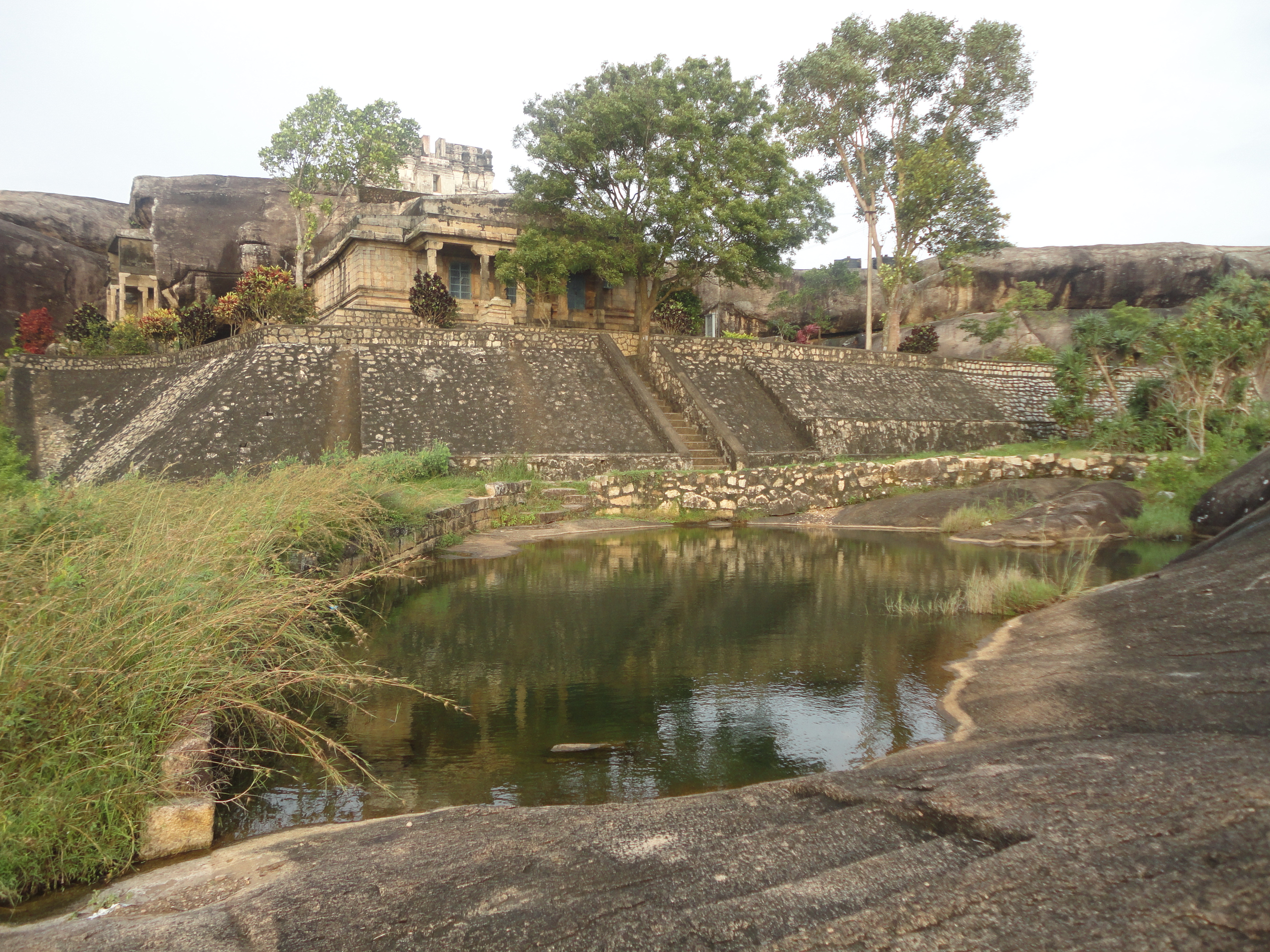
Chitharal Jain Temple

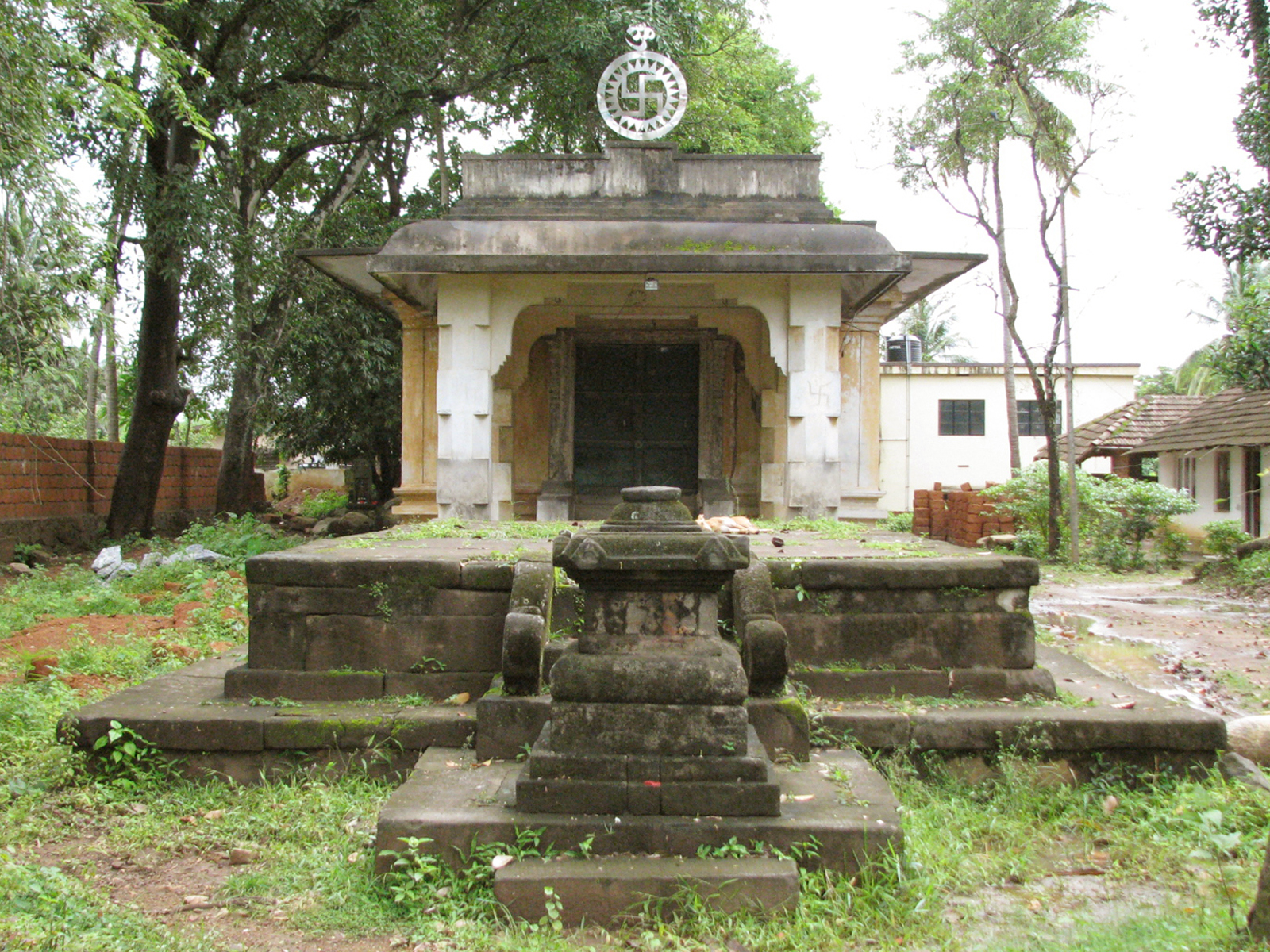
Jainimedu Jain temple, Palakkad

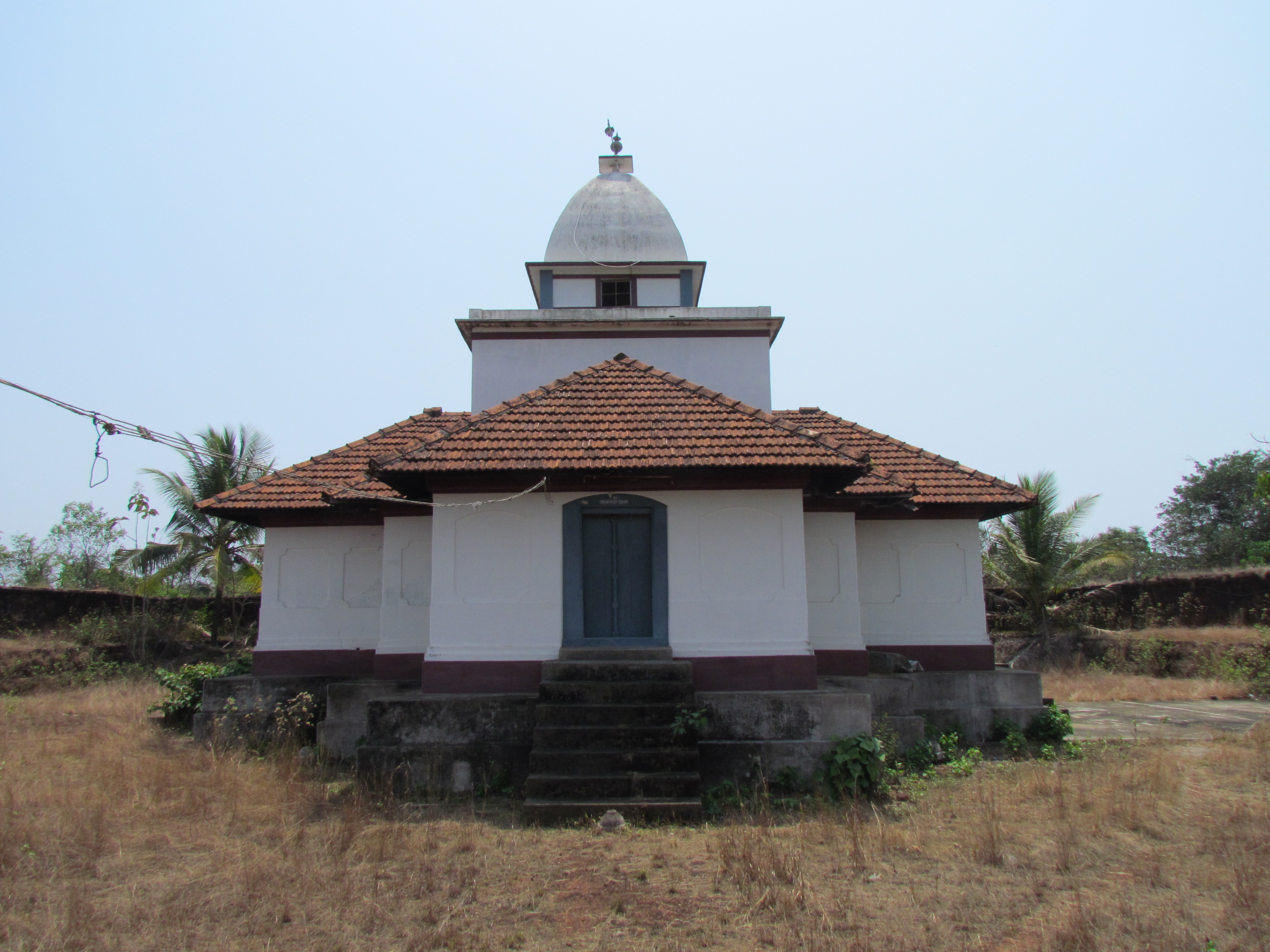
Jain temple in Manjeshwar

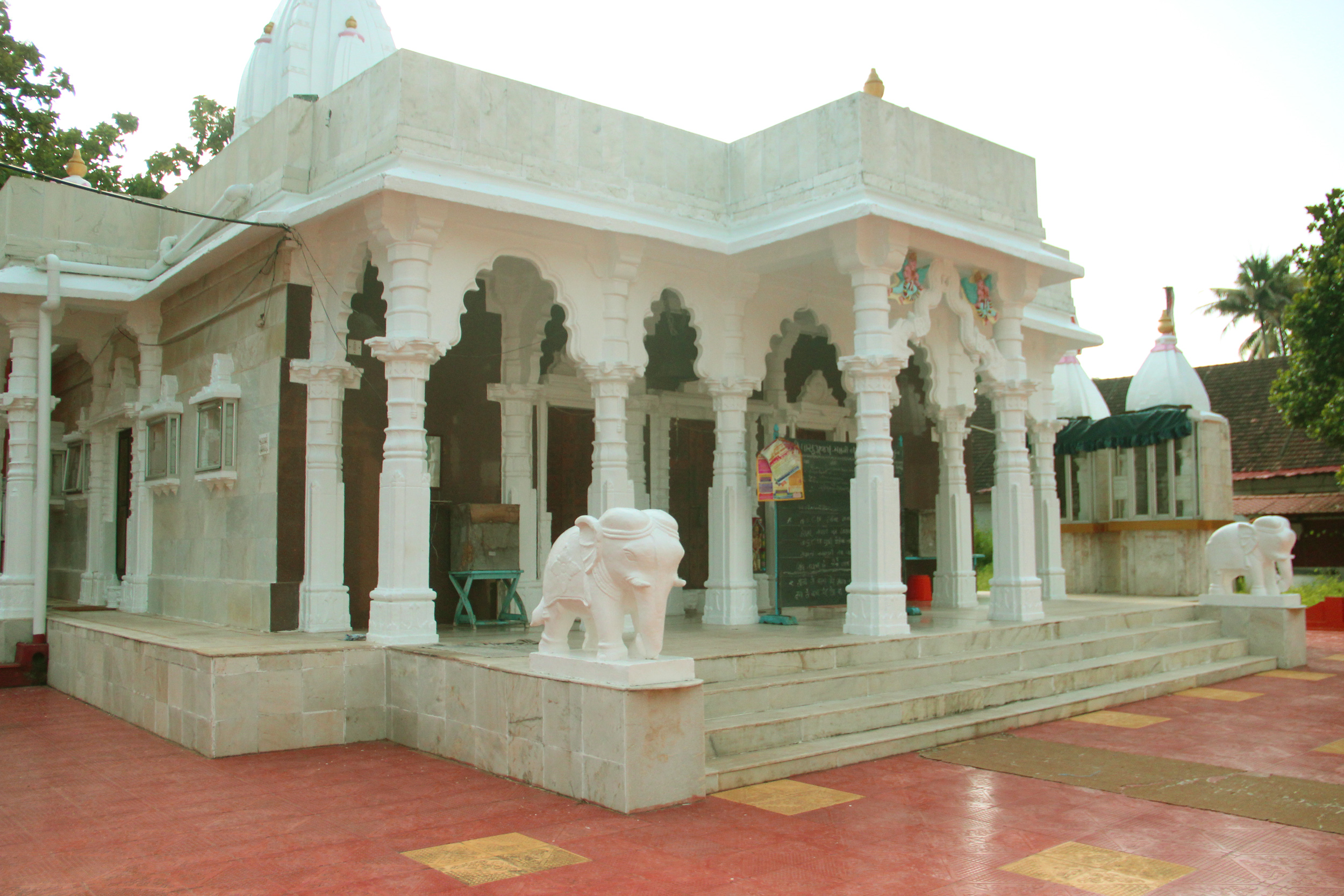
Jain temple, Alleppey

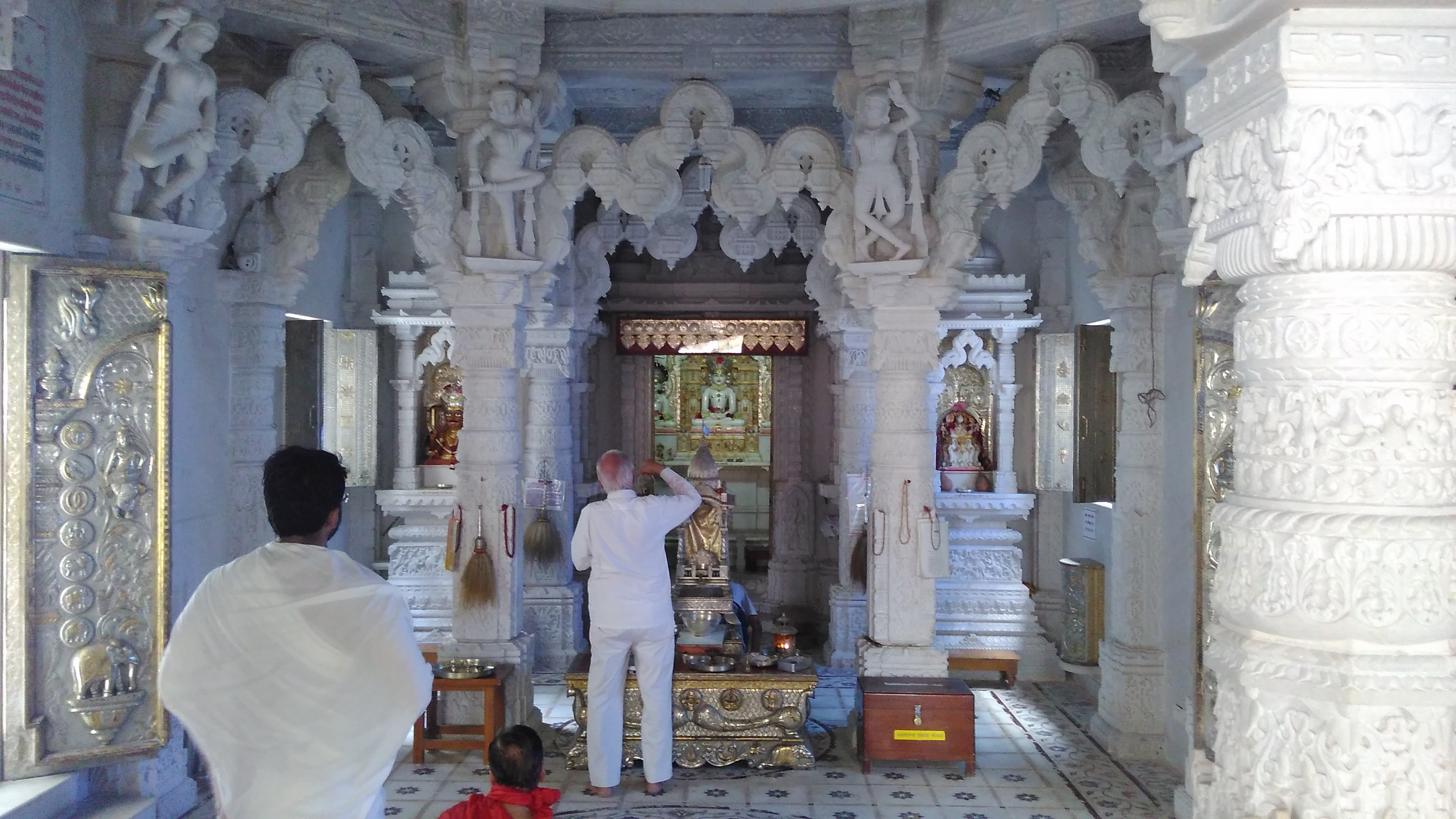
Shri Vasupujya Swami Jain Temple

== See also ==
- Jainism
- Buddhism
