= Jain Temple, Kidanganad =

Jain temple in Kerala, India

- സുൽത്താൻ ബത്തേരി ക്ഷേത്രം
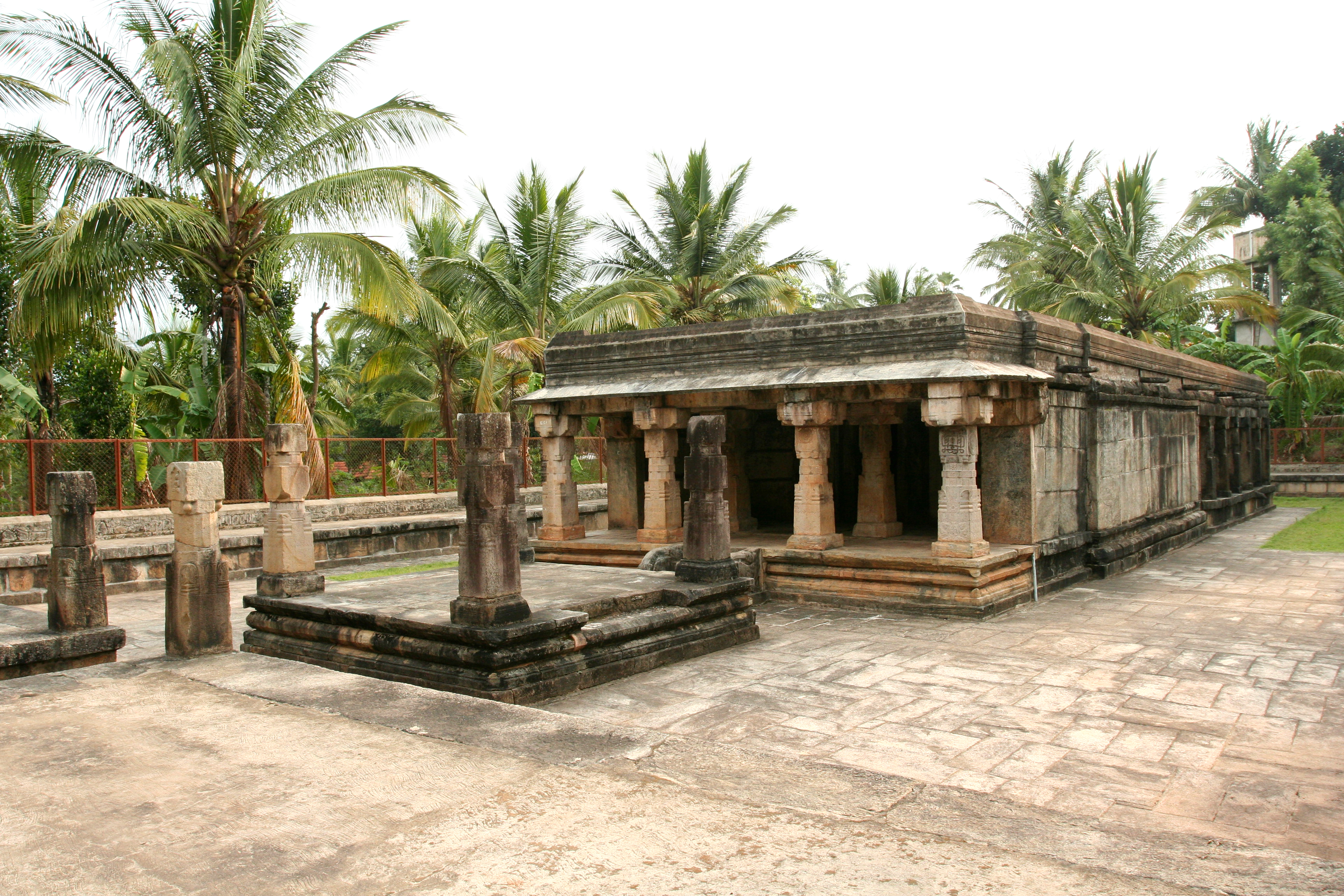
- Bathery Jain Temple

- Location within Kerala Location within India

Religion
- Affiliation: Jainism
- Sect: Digambar
- Festival: Mahavir Jayanti

Location
- Location: Sultan Bathery, Wayanad, Kerala
- Coordinates: 11°39′36.6″N 76°15′02.5″E

Architecture
- Style: Vijayanagara architecture
- Established: 13th Century

Sultan Bathery temple, originally known as Bathery Jain Temple, is a famous Jain temple located at Sultan Bathery, earlier known as Kidanganad town of Kerala.

== About temple ==
The Sultan Bathery temple originally known as, Bathery Jain Temple, was constructed in the 13th century CE by Jains migrated to the region from Tamil Nadu and Karnataka. The temple was built during the reign of Vijayanagara Empire. The temple is a 25 x 7.5 x 4 meter structure that features ornate columns and a stone slabs roof. The temple was an important Jain center until, the temple was invaded and later used it to keep his battery (ammunition store) by Tipu Sultan, of Kingdom of Mysore, in the 18th century. The temple is part of Jain circuit of Kerala.

The temple is a protected monument under the Archaeological Survey of India.

== Gallery ==
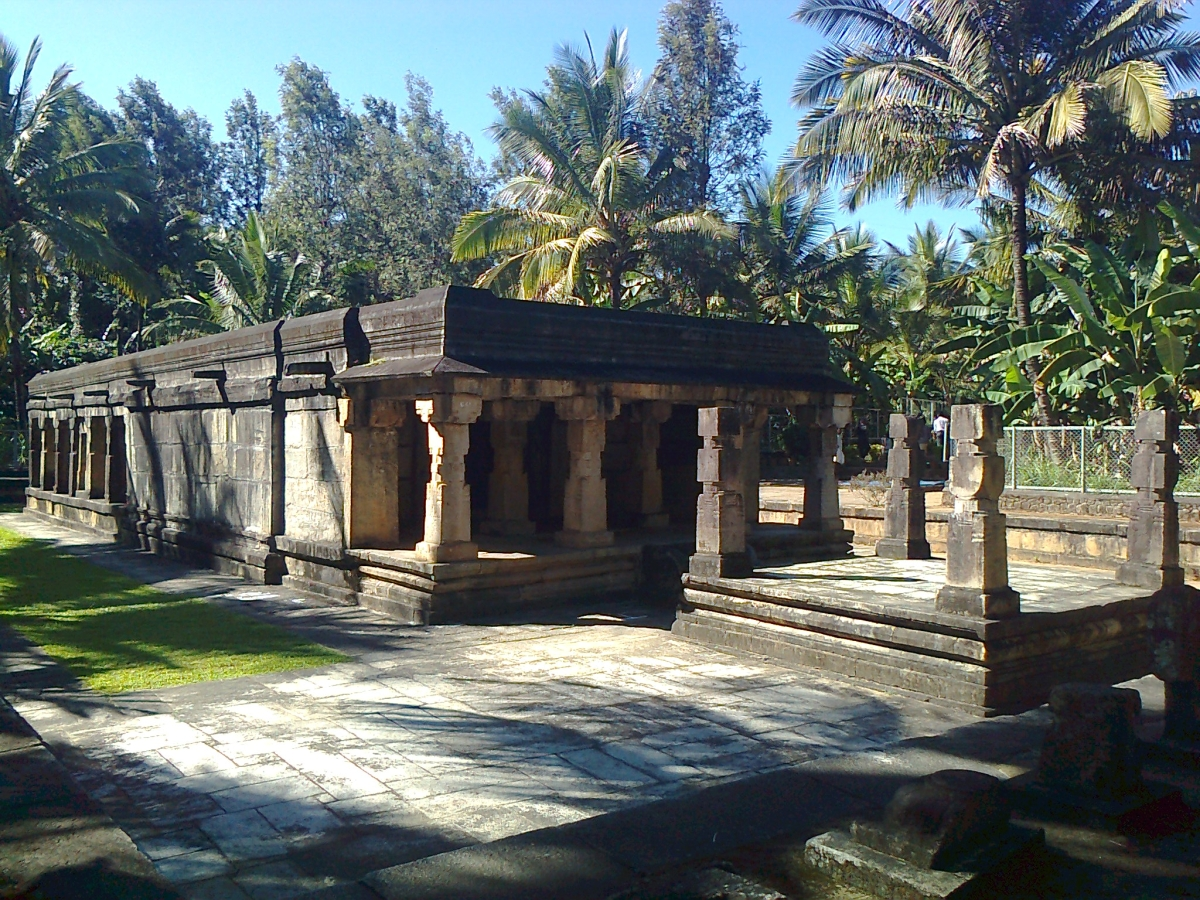
Temple Complex

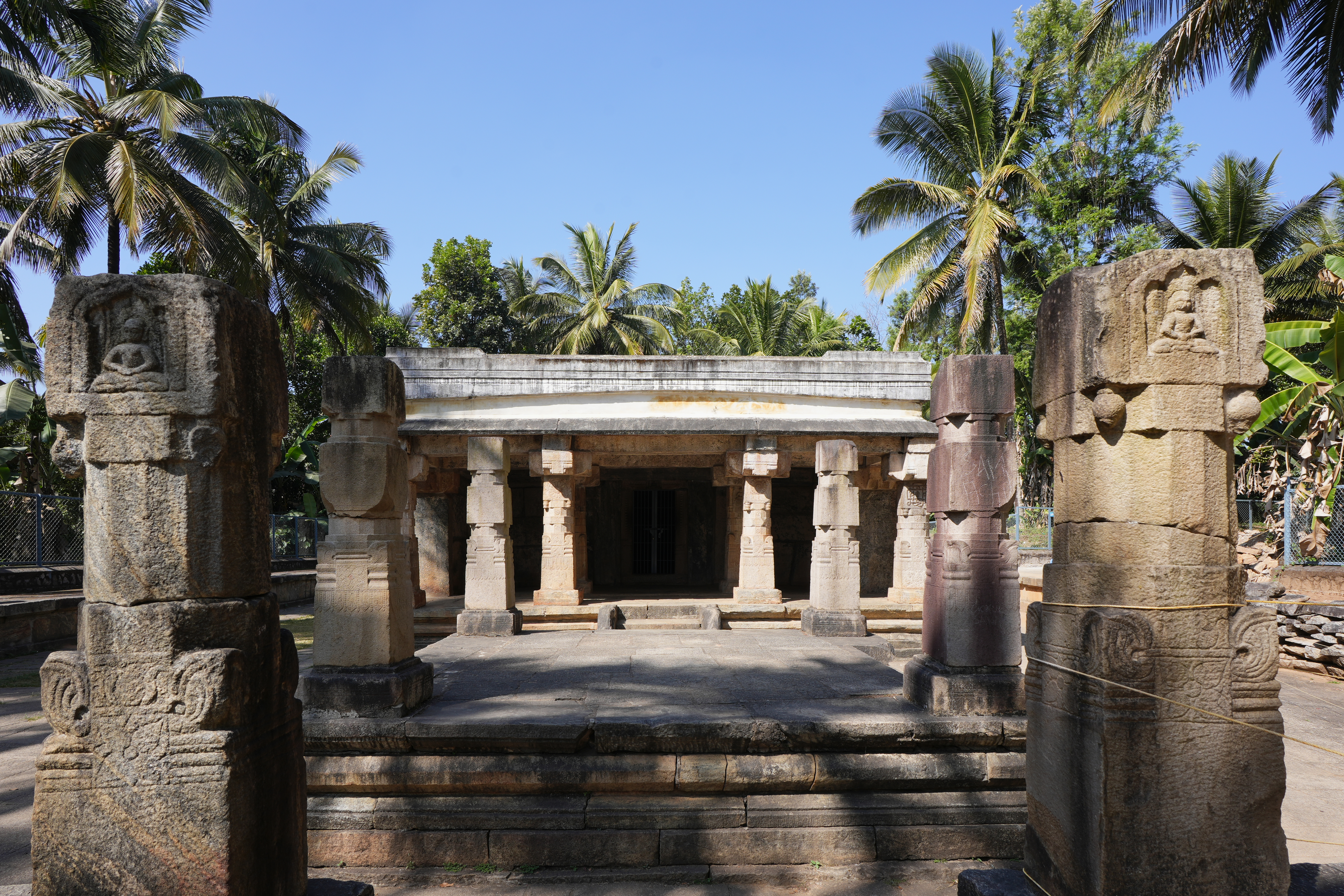
Temple facade

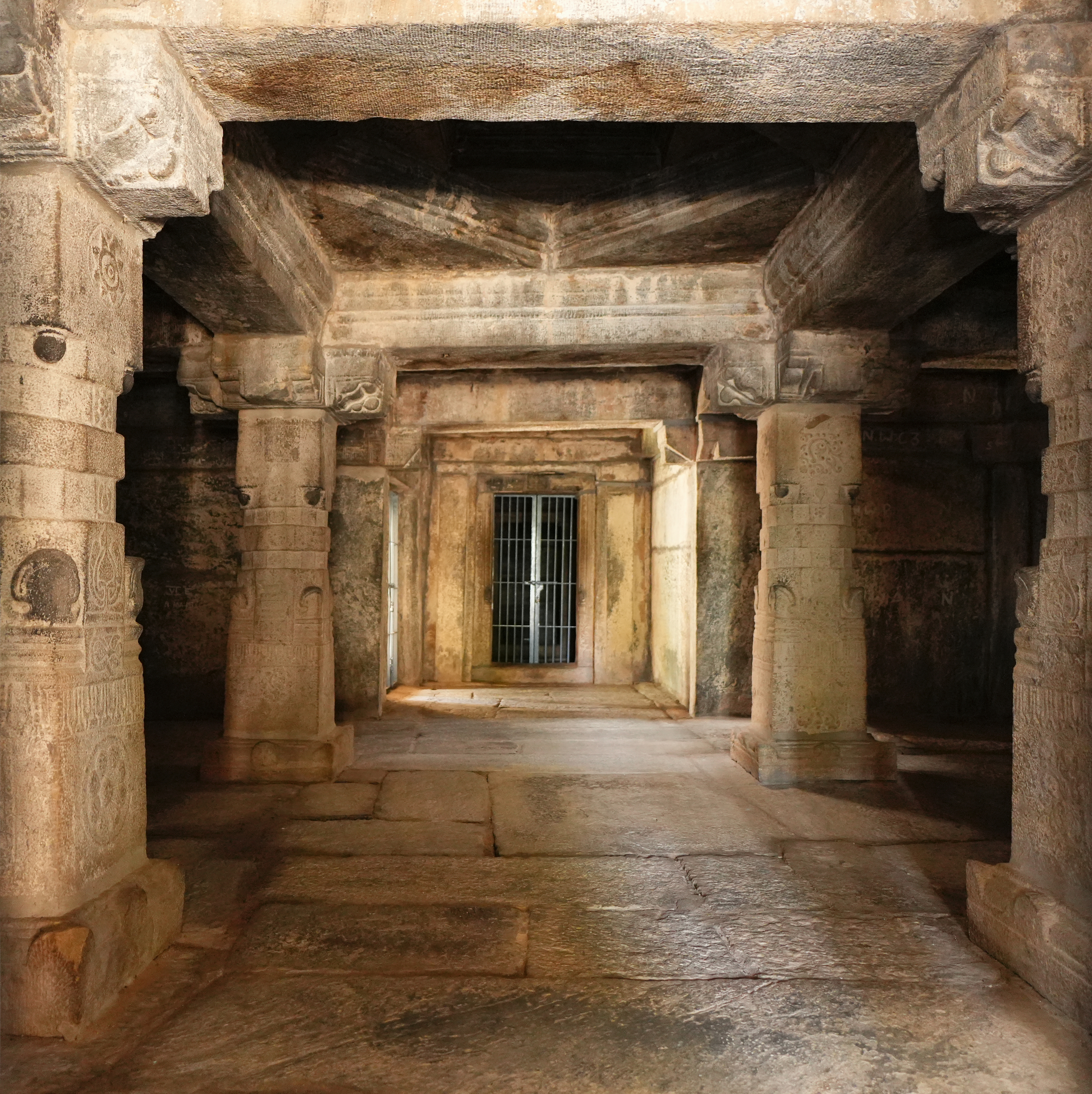
Mandapa

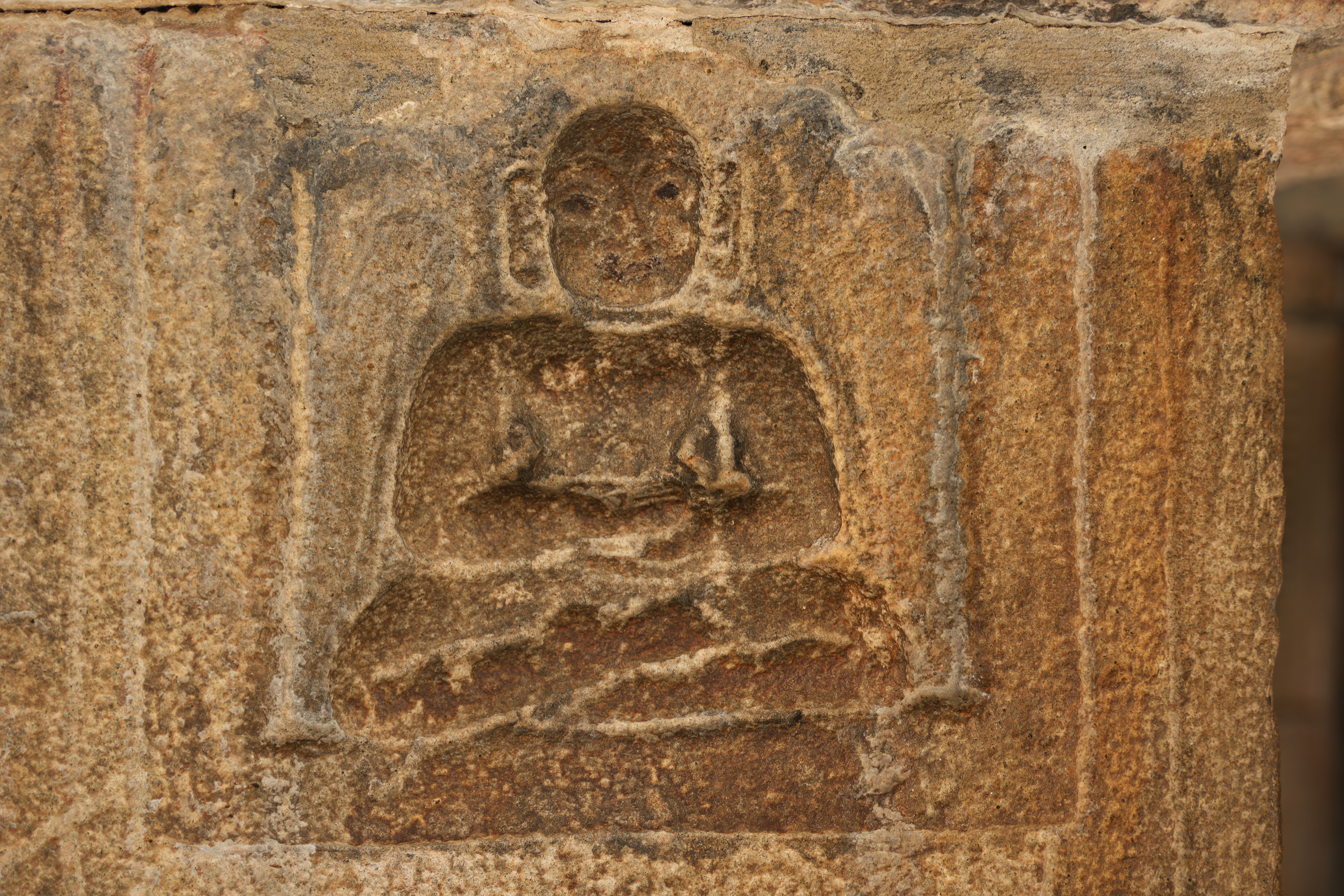
Image of Jina on pillar

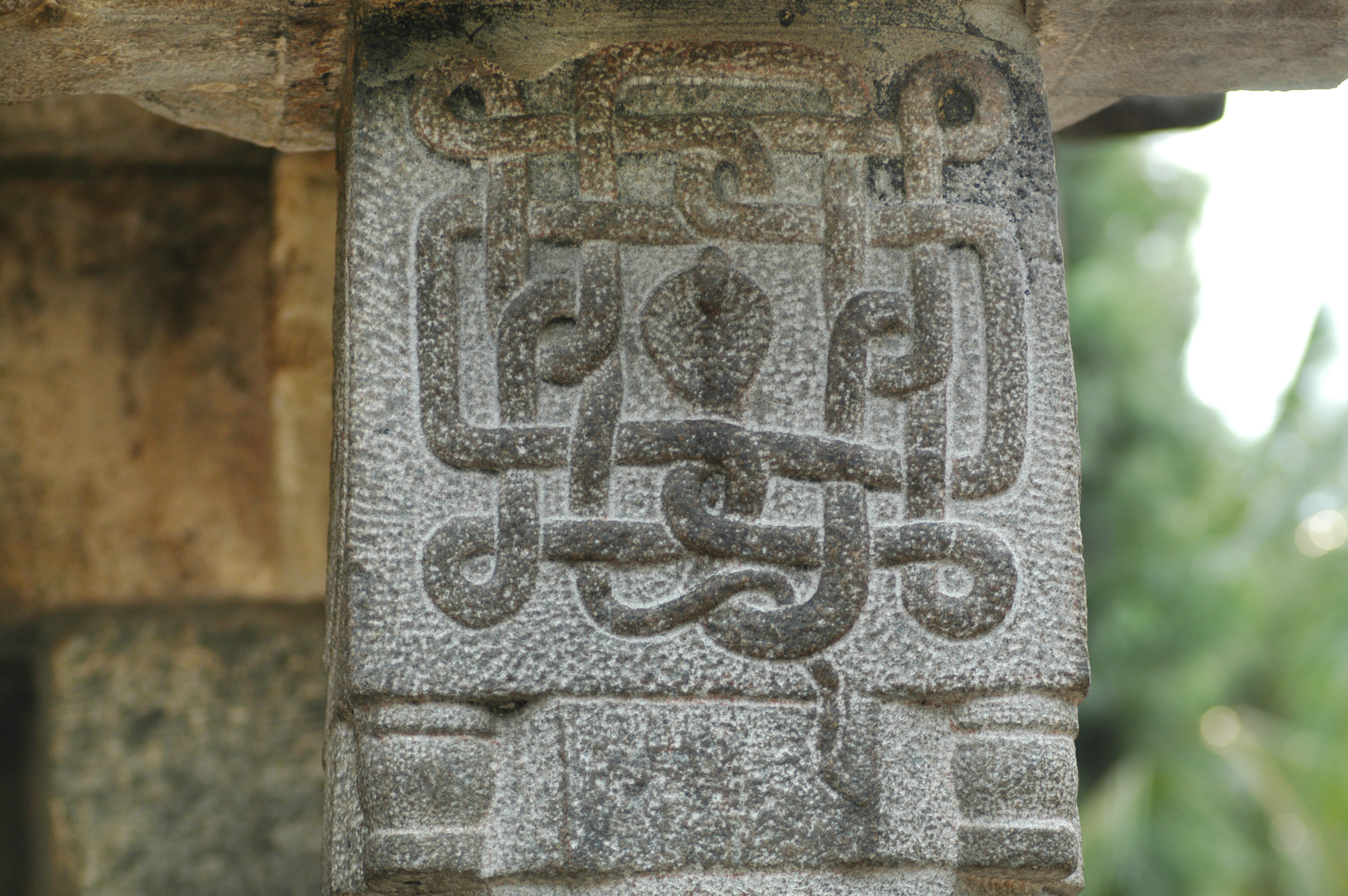
Pillar at the temple

== See also ==
- Jainism in Kerala
