= Jainimedu Jain temple =

Jain temple in Palakkad, Kerala, India

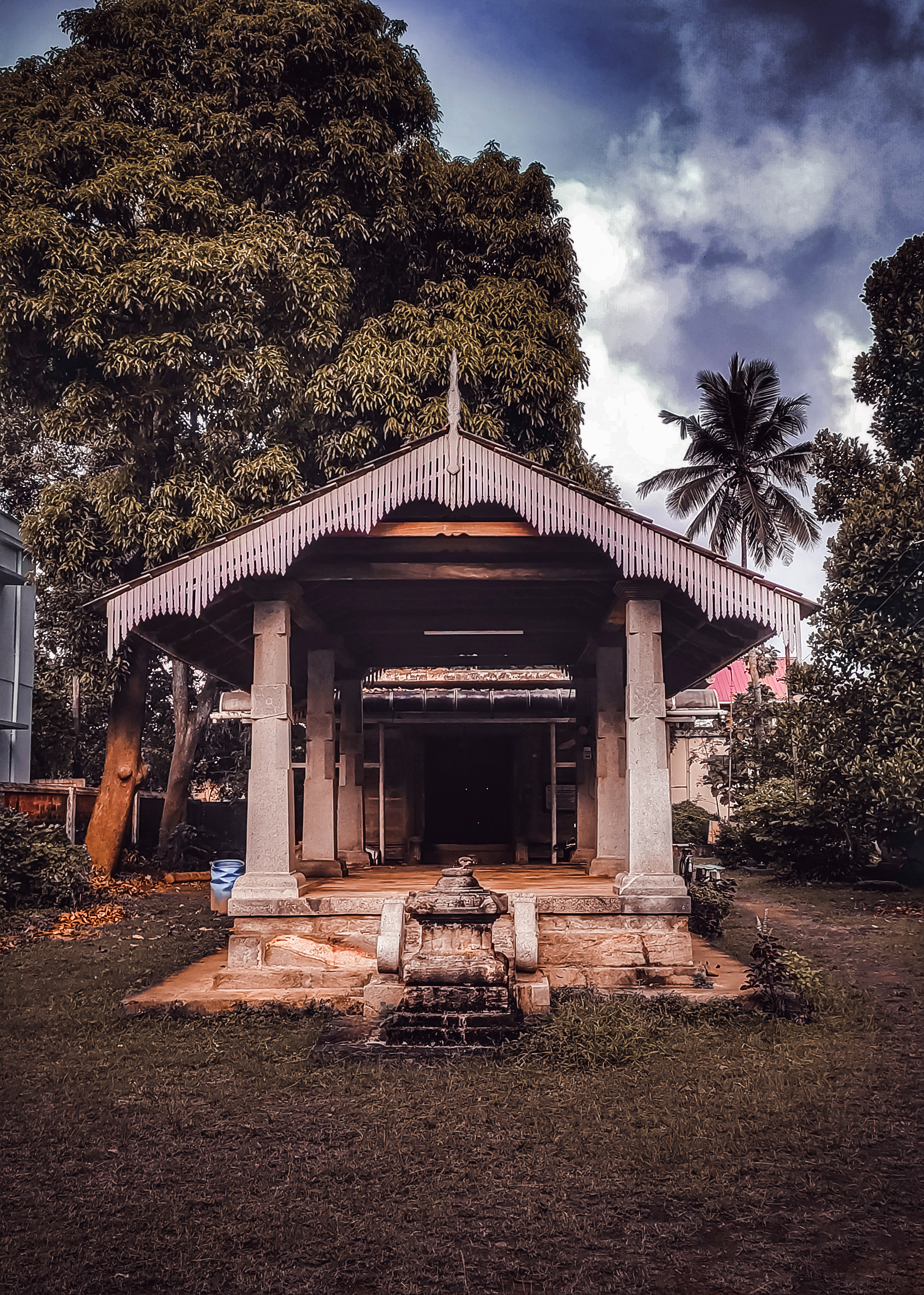
- Jainimedu Jain temple

Religion
- Affiliation: Jainism
- Sect: Digambar
- Deity: Chandraprabha
- Festival: Mahavir Jayanti
- Governing body: Manikka Pattanam Sree Chandraprabha Digambara Basti Trust

Location
- Location: Jainimedu, Palakkad, Kerala
- Interactive map of Jainimedu Jain temple
- Coordinates: 10°47′8.4″N 76°38′33.2″E

Architecture
- Completed: 15th century

Jainimedu Jain temple is a 15th-century Jain temple located in city of Palakkad, Kerala.It is located at Jainimedu, one of the suburbs of the city . It is dedicated to Chandraprabha, a Tirthankar of the Jain faith.

The celebrated Malayalam poet Kumaranasan, wrote his monumental poem Veenapoovu (The fallen flower) at a Jain house near here. The place name 'Jainimedu' itself is related to this temple.

== History ==
The Jain temple was constructed in the 15th century by a family of diamond merchants from Karnataka. It was created by Inchana Satur. The temple was in a dilapidated condition for the past several years. At that time, there were around 400 Jain families in Jainimedu. The temple was renovated in 2013 and a Panch Kalyanak was performed. M. P. Veerendra Kumar, a prominent Keralite Jain, spoke at the event. The rituals were led by Bhuvanakeerthi Bhattakara Swamiji, the head of Kanakagiri Jain Mutt.

This is one of the few places in Kerala where the vestiges of Jainism have survived.

== Description ==
The temple is 32 feet long and 20 feet wide and displays the images of Jain Tirthankaras and Yakshinis.

== Photo gallery ==
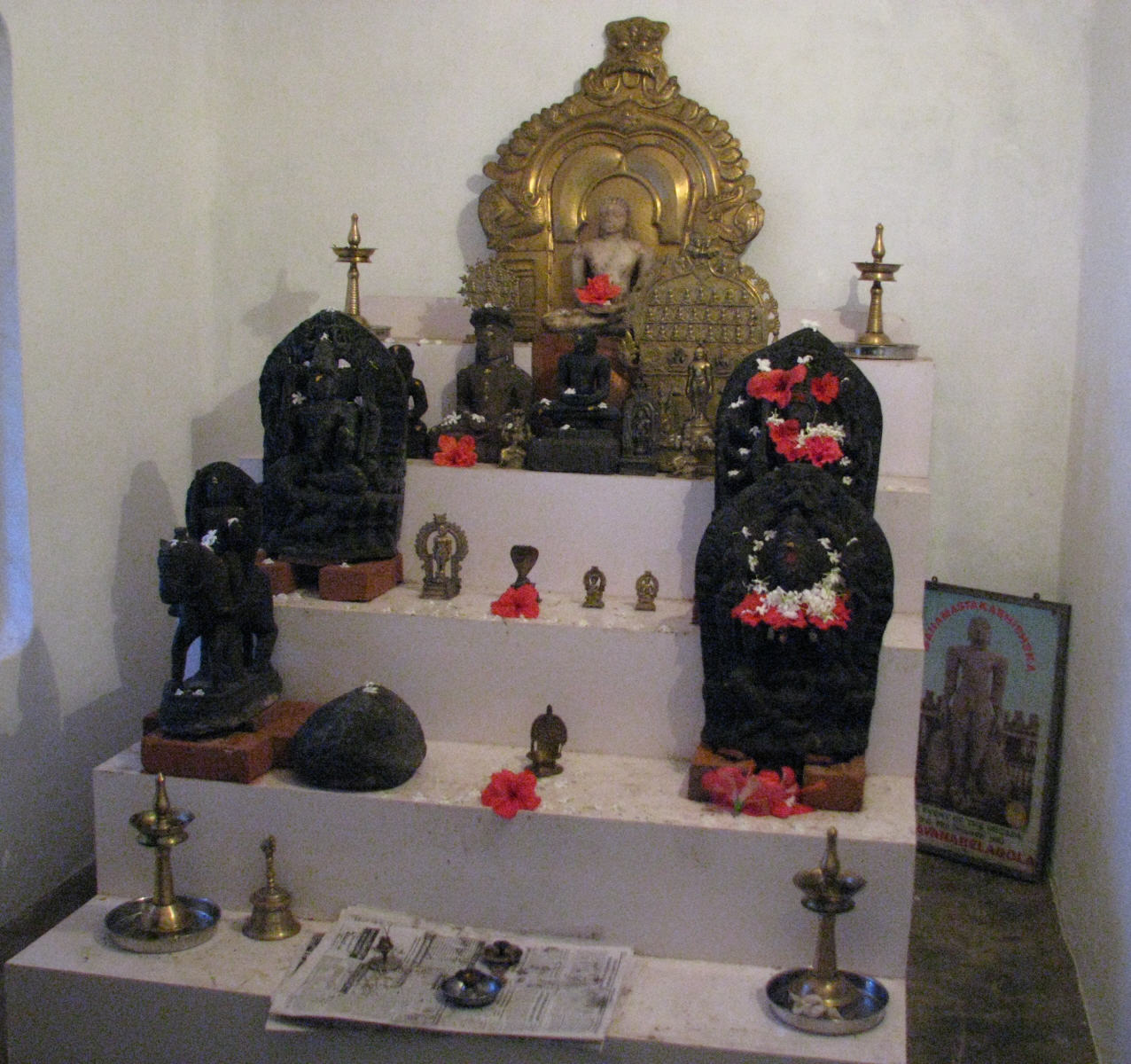
Idols at Jain temple in Jainimedu, Palakkad

== See also ==
- Jainism in Kerala
- Jain Bunt
