= Jain temple, Alappuzha =

Temple in Kerala, India

Alleppey Jain Temple
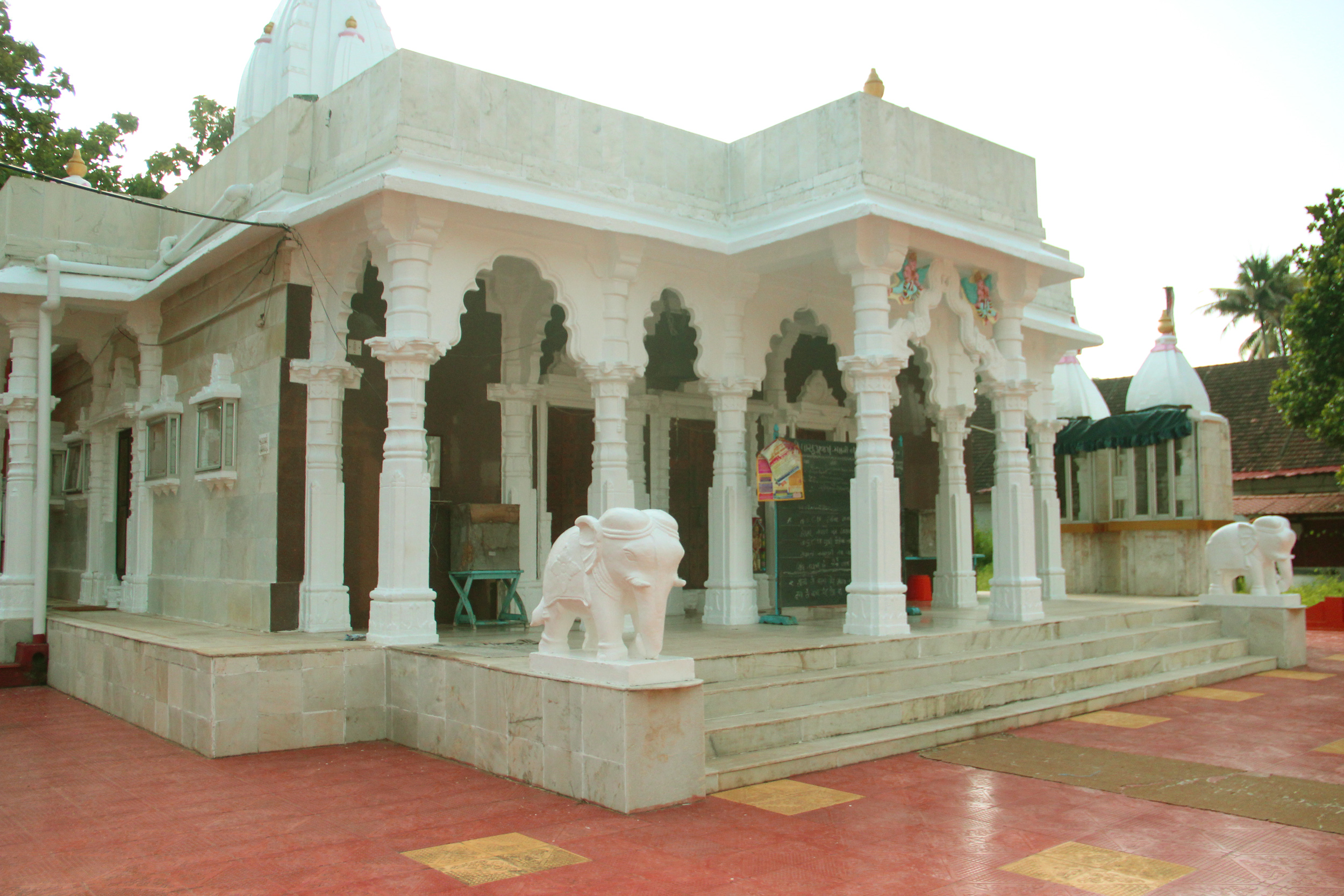
- Shri Jain Shwethambar Temple

- Location in Kerala

Religion
- Affiliation: Jainism
- Deity: Tirthankara Vasupujya Swami
- Festival: Paryushana

Location
- Location: Alappuzha, Kerala, India
- Interactive map of Alleppey Jain Temple
- Coordinates: 9.495101°N 76.3214678°E

Architecture
- Temple: 2

The Jain Temple in Alleppey is a place of worship for Jains in the southern Indian state of Kerala. It was important in the growth of Jainism in South India. It is situated at the Northeast side of the Muppalam at the famous Gujarati Street in Alleppey town.

== Alleppey Sree Jain Shwethambar Temple ==
The temple was built by members of the forty two Jain families brought from the Kutch district of Gujarat. They were brought to Alleppey over a hundred years ago during the reign on Dewan Raja Kesavadas for the industrial development of the township of Alleppey. There are two shrines, one over 100 years old and the newer one was built nearly 22 years ago. The temple has an important role in the socio-economic culture of Alleppey. A trust el's spiritual center, closely observing and following Jain rites, tradition and rituals and the street commonly known as Gujarati Street.

== Architectural Significance ==
Jain Architecture has significantly contributed to the growth of art in India and they are extremely palpable at the intricate and exceptional temple structures that one can observe at various parts of India. Though the temple in no way can compete with the spectacles of Ranak Pur, Mount Abu Jain Temples in Rajasthan or Jain Temple in Kochi, the Jain temple in Alleppey undoubtedly has its charm and poignant style. Unlike many other Jain temples in Kerala, Alleppey Jain Temple has a very distinct and definitive architectural grandeur and style. It is the only such Jain Temple in Kerala that did not use iron to build and also to flaunt a dome atop. The temple was carefully built using Rajasthan Stones and White Marbles to make it charmingly attractive without losing its spiritual implications. One of the striking features of the temple is that it houses numerous frescos or figurines carved from single marble pieces. Though Jain temples have a definitive architectural style, it has taken inspirations from local architectural styles and it is very visible at the Jain temple in Alleppey. It was on 21 February 1994 that the temple has been restored to the style that it parades today. One can observe the statues of four "Thirthankaras" in the temple and it has been arranged to provide maximum view for the devotees who come to worship at the temple. The statue of the 12th Tirthankara Vasupujya Swami is placed at the center and the statues of the 15th Tirthankara Swami Dharmanatha and the 11th Thirthankara Swami Shreyansanatha have been placed at the right and left sides of the statue of Tirthankara Vasupujya Swami. At the top floor of the temple, the statue of the 23rd Thirthankara Parshvanatha Swami can be observed as well. This statue is unearthed in Kuttanad which is a great reminiscence of the growth of Jainism in ancient Kerala. Jain followers are really particular about using a rosary to pray called Japamala "Jain prayer beads" and these are made of special threads. A blessed "Japamala" is placed at the center of the temple which can be observed by the devotees.

== Festival at Jain Temple ==
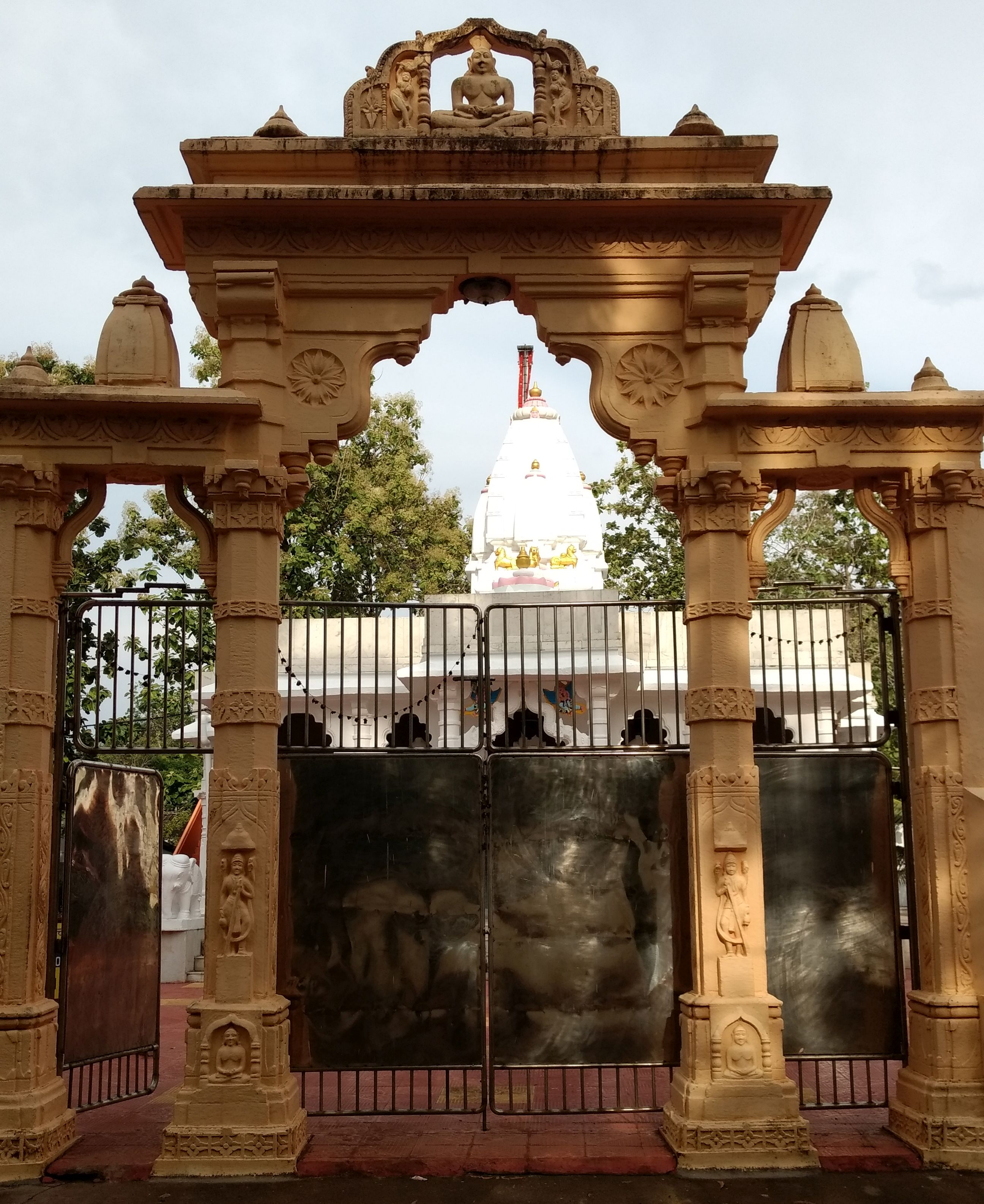
Entry gate

Jains have a very strict and particular code of rituals and rites and it is imperative that these rituals and rites are observed by everyone in the community strictly without any fail whatsoever. Every day "Sanatra Pooja" aka "Snatra Puja" is conducted for around one and half hours which is believed to bring spiritual sanctity and nirvana to their lives. The festival of their temple is called "Parva paryushana" and the same is conducted once every year. The festival lasts for eight days and it is usually celebrated in the month of August–September. During the festival, many aacharyas from Gujarat come to the temple. They also have the habitual ritual of reading the history of the 24 Tirthankara at the temple, during the festival. During the Jain festival, there are no concrete norms for fasting and meditating and this is a rather surprising side of Jainism. The followers have the freedom to carryout prayers and fasting according to their capacity and desires. Jain followers are pure vegetarians "Jain vegetarianism" and they are forbidden from consuming alcohol. Those who consume meat and alcohol are strictly prohibited from entering the premises of the temple. Though they are vegetarians, they also do not consume anything that grows underground. Their religious belief emphasizes that they must only eat such food that grows above the ground getting a lot of sunlight. For adherents of Jainism, attaining ‘moksha’ is the fundamental purpose of living. Their life is considered to be a means to reach or attain salvation. There is also a pilgrim house near the temple where Jain pilgrims can stay and offer 'puja' (worship).

== See also ==
- Jainism in Mumbai
- Jainism in Kerala
- Jainism in Karnataka
- List of Jain temples
