= Anantanatha =

14th Tirthankara in Jainism

- 14th Jain Tirthankara
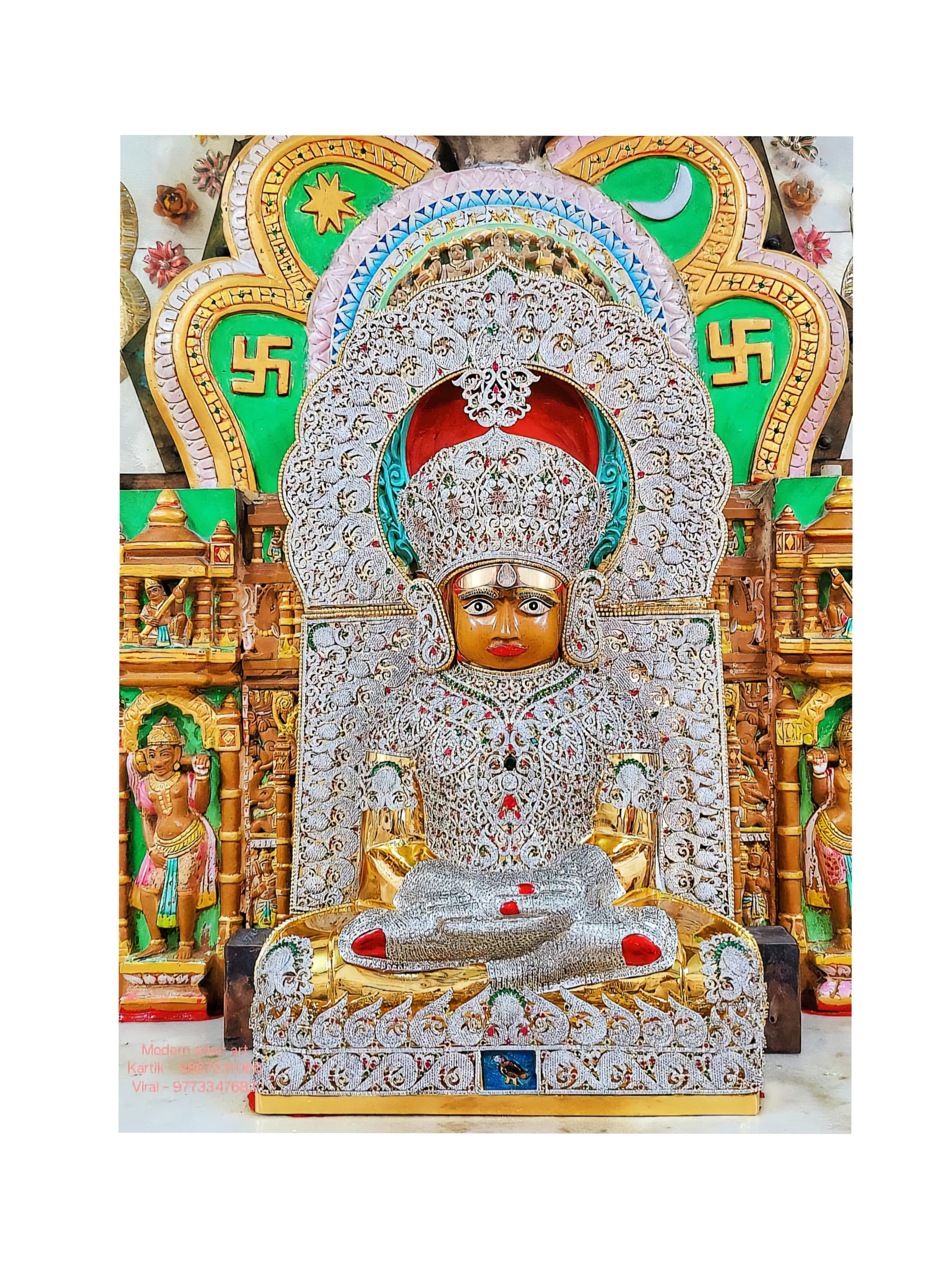
- Idol of Anantnath at Anantnath Jain Temple, Narshi Natha Street, Mumbai
- Venerated in: Jainism
- Predecessor: Vimalnath
- Successor: Dharmanath
- Symbol: Porcupine as per Digambara; Falcon as per Śvetāmbara
- Height: 50 dhanusha (150 meters)
- Age: 3,000,000 years
- Color: Golden

Genealogy
- Born: Ayodhya
- Died: Sammed Shikharji
- Parents: Simhasena (father); Suyasha (mother)
- Dynasty: Ikṣvākuvaṁśa

Anantnath was the fourteenth Tirthankara of the present age (Avasarpini) of Jainism. According to Jain beliefs, he became a siddha, a liberated soul which has destroyed all of its karma.

== Biography ==
Anantnath was the fourteenth Tirthankara of the present age (Avasarpini) of Jainism. According to Jain beliefs, he became a siddha, a liberated soul which has destroyed all of its karma.His name, meaning "Infinite Lord", symbolizes the boundlessness of spiritual liberation in Jain philosophy. The Jainpedia account describes the five major kalyanakas, which are conception, birth, renunciation, enlightenment, and liberation. These mark the sacred milestones of his life as preserved in both Svetambara and Digambara traditions.

Anantnath was born to King Sinhasena and Queen Suyasha at Ayodhya in the Ikshvaku dynasty. His birth date was the 13th day of the Vaishakha Krishna month of the Indian calendar. From a young age, Anantnath exhibited signs of spiritual inclination, including detachment from worldly pleasures and an early interest in meditation and reflection, as described in Jain narratives. After living a princely life, he renounced worldly attachments and undertook rigorous ascetic practices, eventually attaining kevala jñāna, or omniscience, through meditation and discipline. His height is mentioned as 50 dhanusha. He is said to have lived for 3,000,000 years.

Anantnath is said to have been born 9 sagara after his predecessor, Vimalnath. His successor, Dharmanath, is said to have been born 4 sagara after him.

== Literature and iconography ==
In Jain iconography, Anantanatha is traditionally depicted in a meditative posture with a golden complexion. He is uniquely identified by his distinct iconographic emblem, though the specific animal varies by sectarian tradition; the Śvētāmbara sect associates him with the falcon, while the Digambara sect identifies him with the porcupine or bear. Beyond his physical depiction, Anantanatha has been a subject of significant medieval Jain literature. Most notably, the Anantanatha Purana, a major Kannada epic written by the prominent poet Janna in 1230 CE, provides a detailed poetic account of his life and teachings and remains a classic of Kannada literature.

== Famous Temple ==
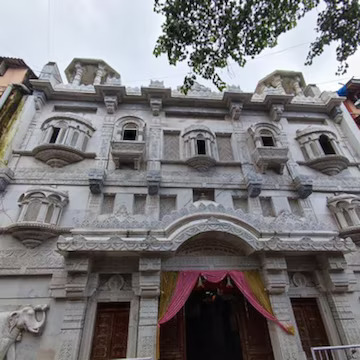
Anantnath Derasar Narshi Natha Street, Kharek Bazar

As the 14th tirthankara, Anantanatha is venerated across the Indian subcontinent, with several prominent temple complexes dedicated specifically to his worship.

=== Places of birth and liberation ===
Marking the geographic site of his ultimate spiritual liberation, a dedicated shrine (tonk) enshrining his footprints (charan) is actively venerated by pilgrims on the peaks of Mount Shikharji.

=== Other temples ===
In southern India, the Anantnath Swami Temple located in Kalpetta, within the Wayanad district, serves as one of the most historically significant Jain monuments in Kerala. Constructed in the traditional Dravidian architectural style, it functions as a crucial spiritual center for the regional Jain community. In western India, the Anantnath Derasar situated in the bustling mercantile district of Mandvi in Mumbai stands as a major center of worship for the urban Śvētāmbara diaspora.

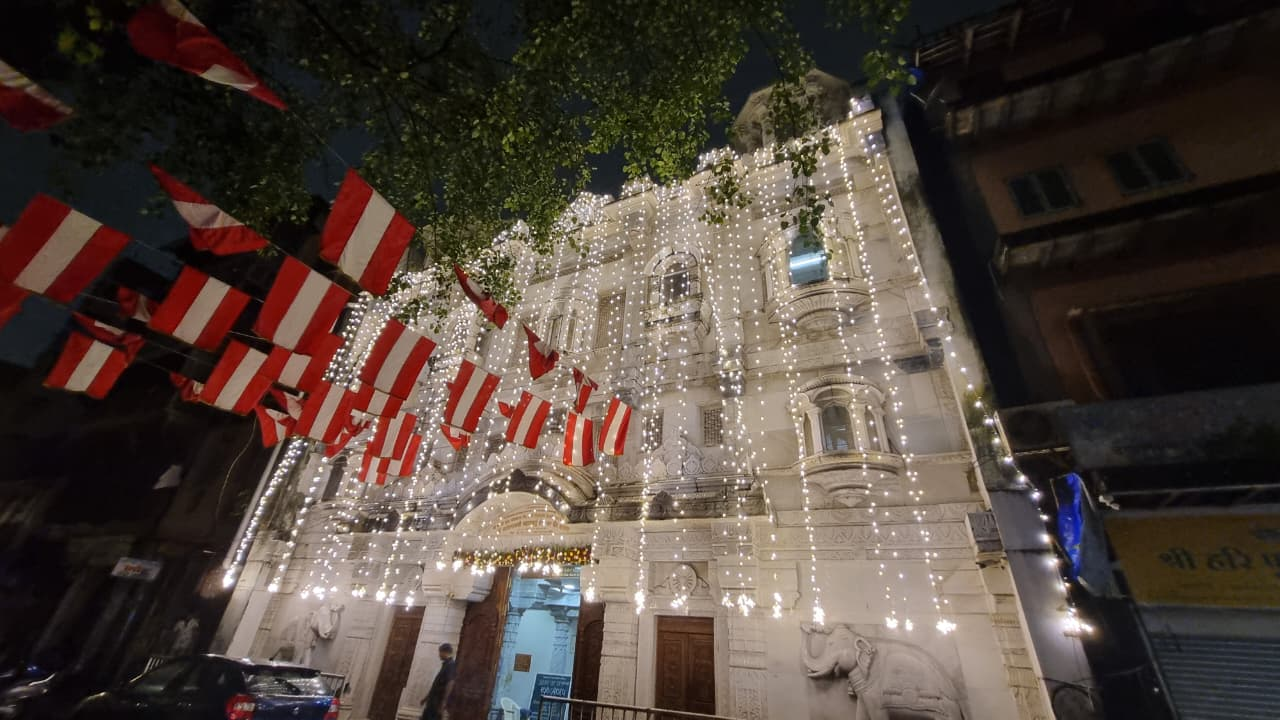
Anantnath Derasar at Narshi Natha Street

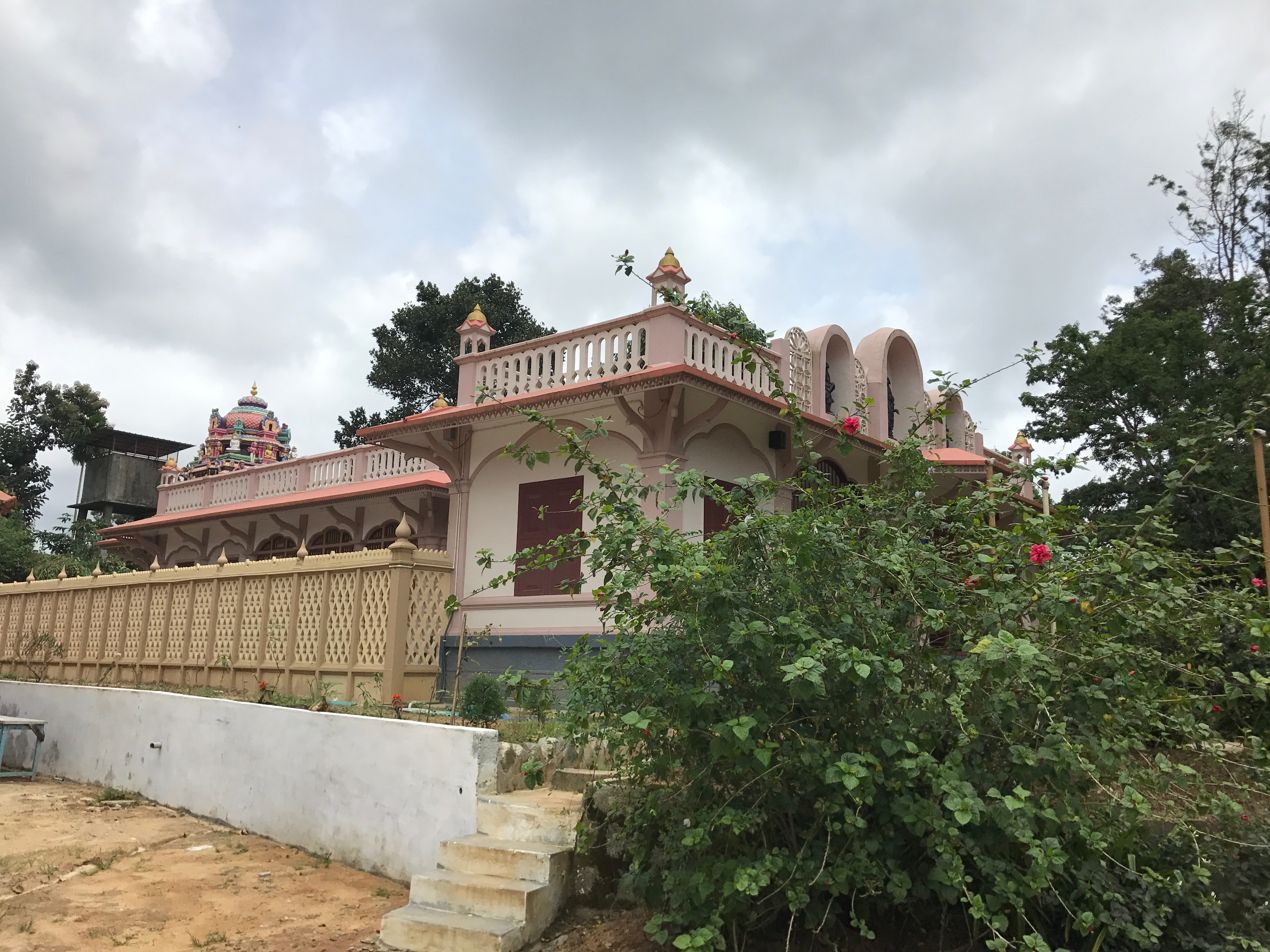
Anantnath Swami Temple in Kalpetta, Kerala

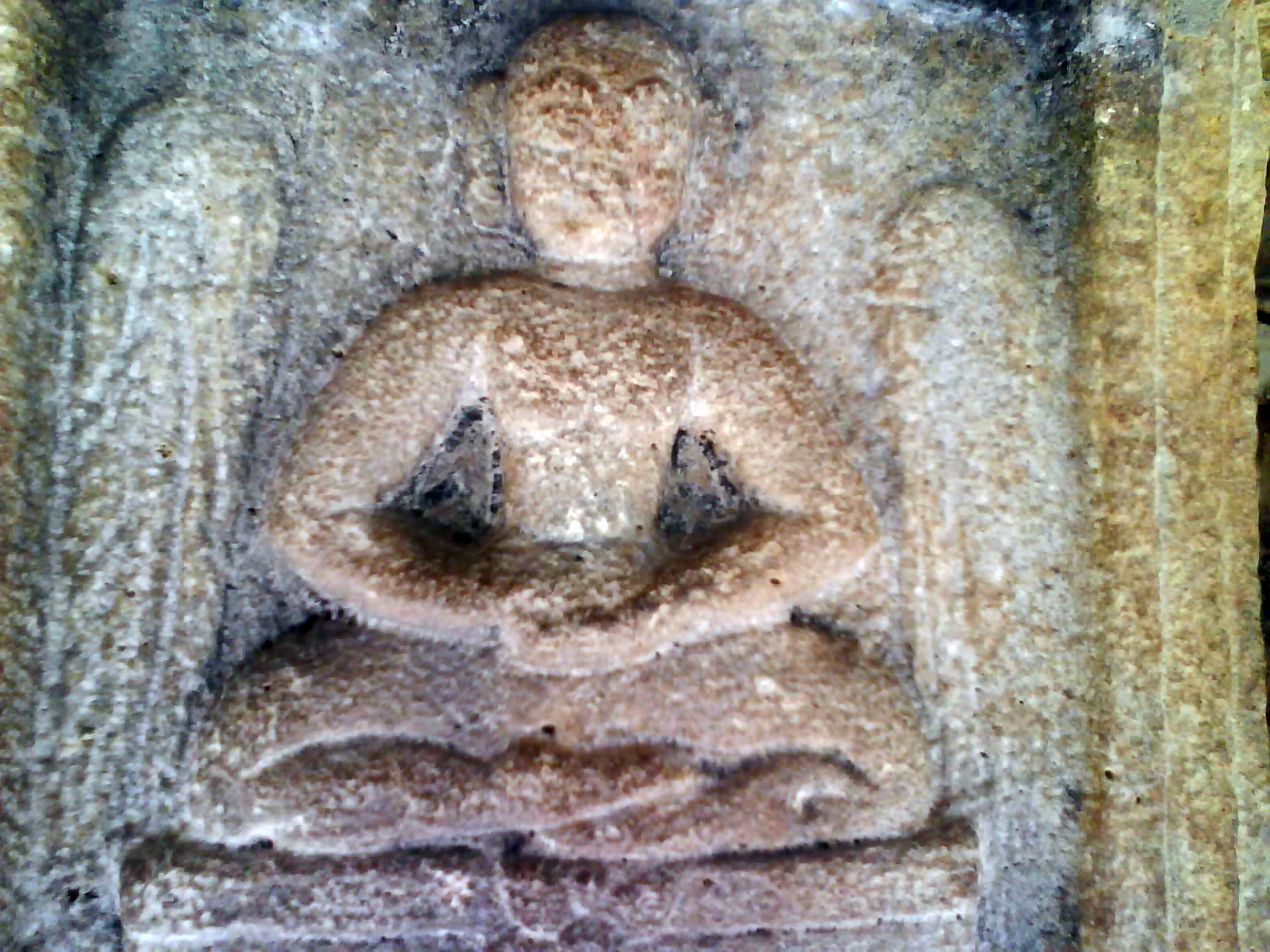
Image at Anantnath Swami Temple

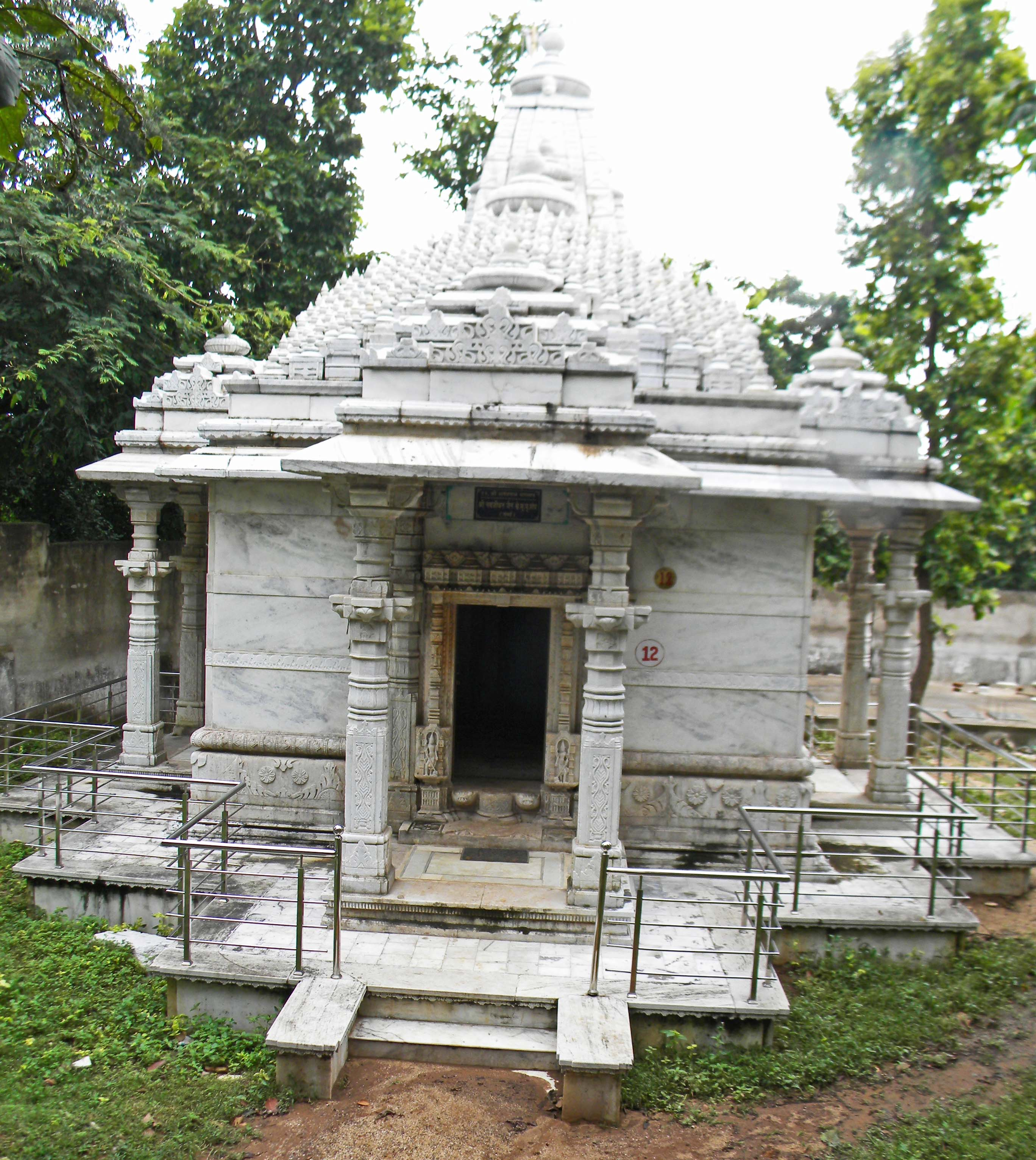
Ananthnath Temple, Madhuban

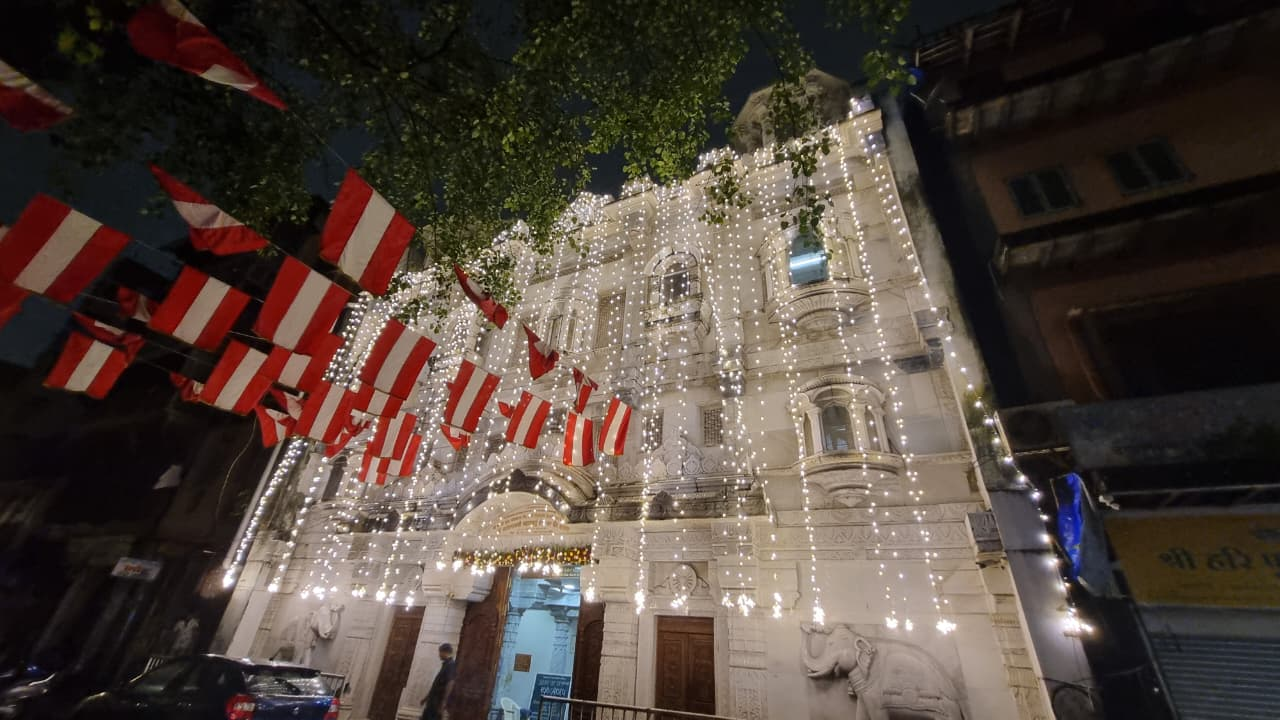
Anantnath Derasar, Narshi Natha Street, Mumbai

== See also ==
- Jainism and non-creationism
