= Anantnath Swami Temple =

Jain Temple in Kerala, India

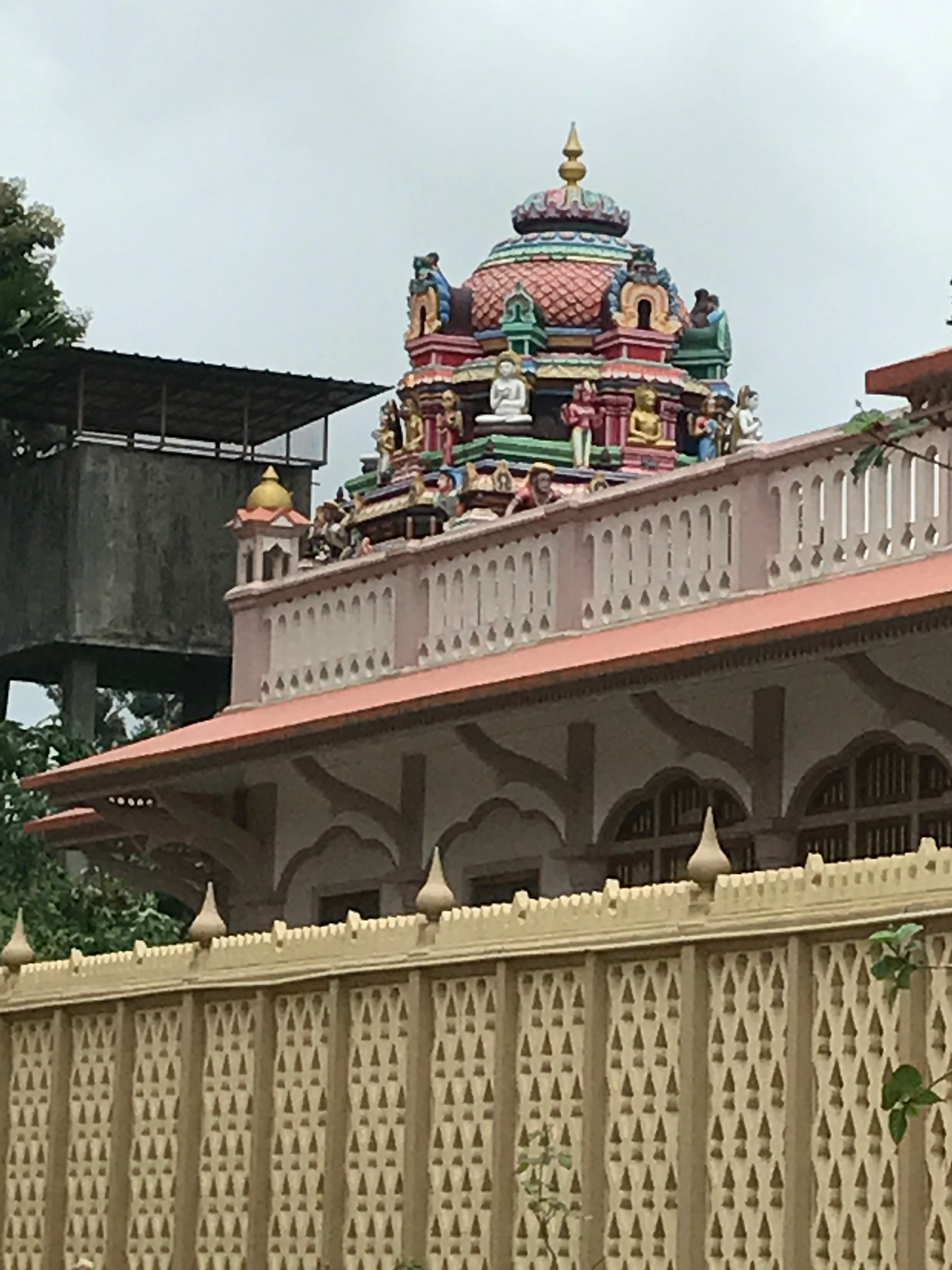

- Location within Kerala

Religion
- Affiliation: Jainism
- Deity: Anantnath

Location
- Location: Puliyarmala, Kalpetta, Wayanad, Kerala
- Coordinates: 11.640756°N 76.086983°E

Anantnath Swami Temple (also known as the Puliyarmala Jain Temple is a Jain temple located at Puliyarmala, 6 km from Kalpetta in the Wayanad district in the state of Kerala in India. It is dedicated to Anantnath Swami, a Tirthankar of the Jain faith. The Jain temple is located at Puliyarmala, Kalpetta in the district of Wayanad in Kerala. It is dedicated to Lord Anantanatha, the 14th Tirthankara.

== Gallery ==
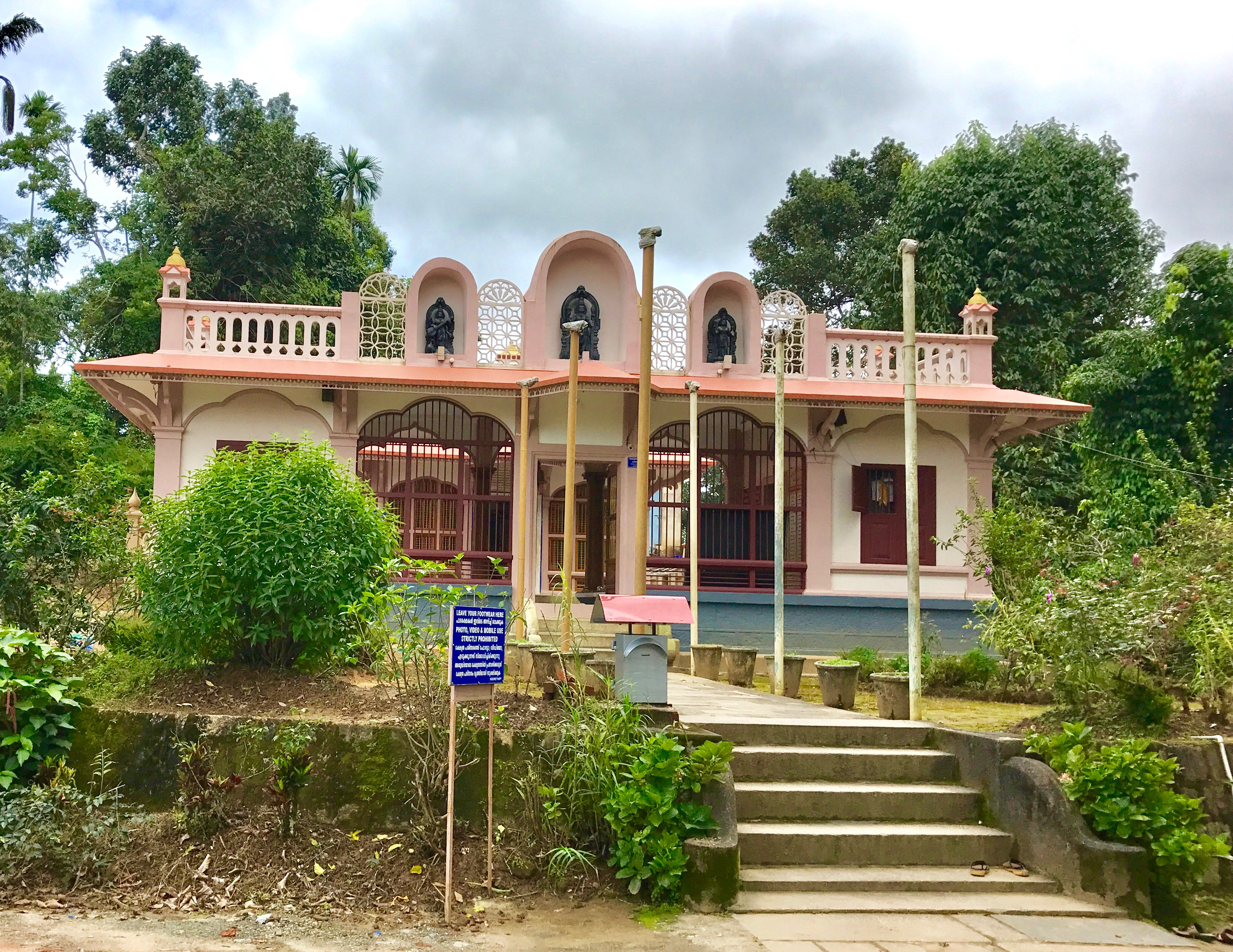
View of entrance to Anantnatha Swami Jain temple at Wayanad, Kerala

== See also ==
- Jainism in Kerala
- Jain Bunt
