= Kochi Jain temple =

Jain temples in the state of Kerala

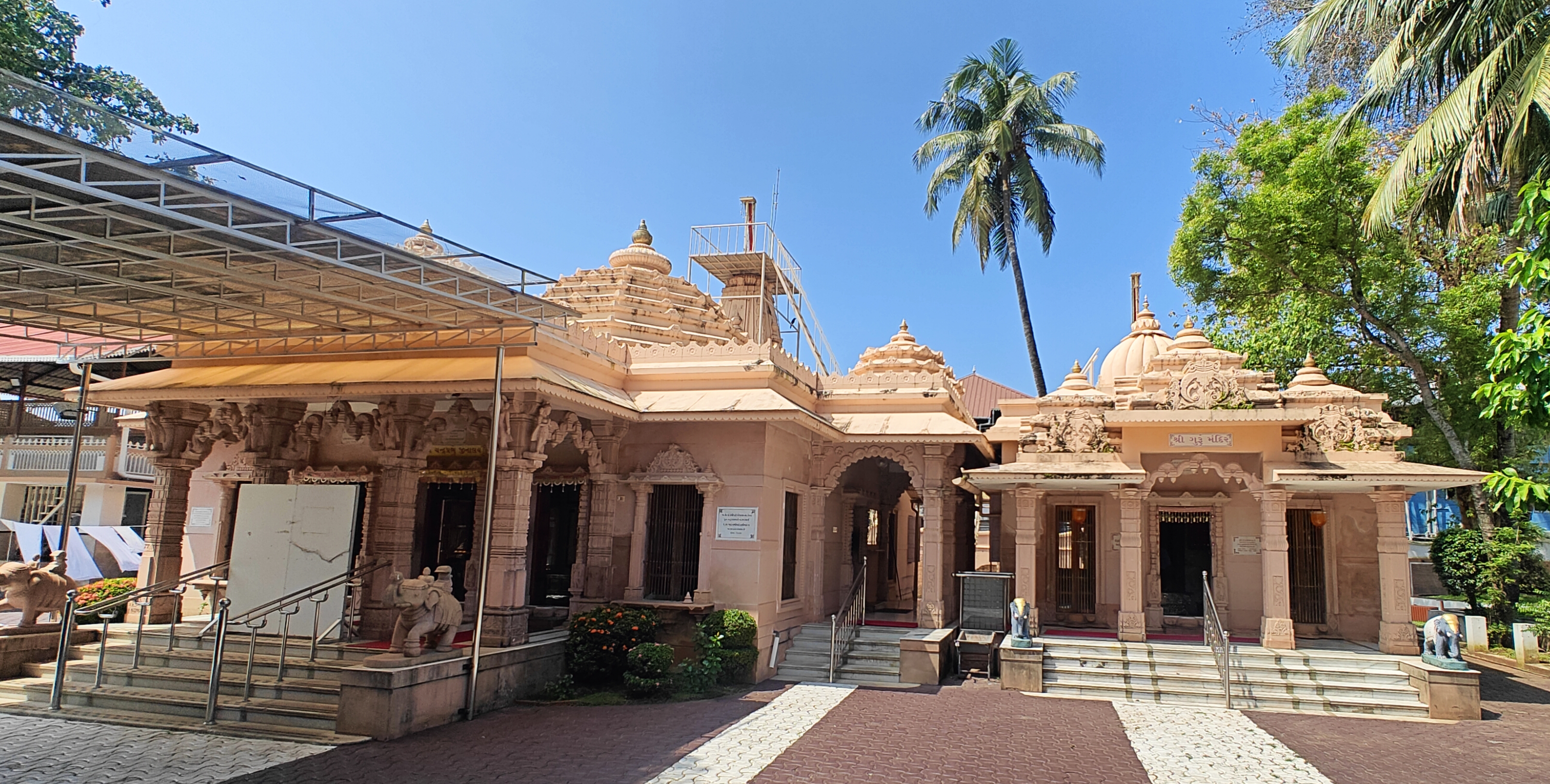
- Dharmanath Jain Temple

Religion
- Affiliation: Jainism
- Deity: Dharmanatha, Chandraprabha
- Festivals: Mahavir Jayanti, Paryushan
- Governing body: Cochin Swetamber Murtipujak Jain Sangh

Location
- Location: Mattancherry, Kochi, Kerala
- Interactive map of Kochi Jain temple
- Coordinates: 9°57′43″N 76°15′16″E

Architecture
- Creator: Hirubhai Jivraj Dhanji
- Established: 1904
- Temple: 2

Website
- jaintemplecochin.org

The Kochi Jain temple or Dharmanath Jain temple is a Jain temple in the Mattancherry in Kochi, Kerala. Built in 1904, the temple is associated with the Gujarati Jain community that settled in Mattancherry as part of the mercantile migration from western India to Kochi.

== History ==
Historically, Jains from Kutch & Saurastra used to come to Cochin, Kozhikode and Alleppey for business. The Jain community of Mattancherry was part of a wider migration of merchants from Gujarat to the port city of Kochi. Scholarly discussion of the religious communities of Mattancherry traces this Gujarati migration to at least the nineteenth century. This temple was built in 1904 CE (VS 1960) by Hirubai Jivraj Dhanji constructed this temple in memory of her husband Jivraj Dhanji.

The 1904 date is also independently recorded in scholarship on the religious traditions of South Asian communities, which describes the Bhagwan Shri Dharmanath Jain temple as representing the Gujarati migration to Mattancherry. The establishment of the temple reflects the development of Mattancherry as a religiously and culturally diverse mercantile settlement. Gujarati Jains formed one of several trading communities that established religious institutions in the neighbourhood.

== Architecture ==
This temple is one of the major Jain pilgrimage site of India. The temple is beautifully tiled with white marble and adorned with artworks, sculptured pillars and idols of Tirthankaras. The mulnayak of the temple is an idol of Dharmanatha, the 15th tirthankara. The temple architecture is inspired by the Jain temples of Gujarat. The use of a Gujarati-derived architectural vocabulary reflects the western Indian origins of the Jain mercantile community associated with the temple.

There is another Jain temple dedicated to Chandraprabha within the temple complex. The temple complex therefore contains separate shrines associated with Dharmanatha and Chandraprabha.

== Jain community in Mattancherry ==
The temple forms part of the distinctive religious landscape of Mattancherry, which developed as a settlement of trading communities from different regions and religious traditions. The Jain community represented at the Dharmanath temple originated principally in western India, particularly Gujarat. The establishment of the temple in 1904 provides material evidence of the presence of the Gujarati Jain mercantile community in Kochi by the beginning of the twentieth century.

The Government of Kerala's Mattancherry Village Office describes the temple as an important religious institution of the Gujarati population settled in Mattancherry and notes the extensive use of white marble in the structure.

== Festival ==
Paryushana festival is annually organised in temple to observe an eight-day self purification festival - Paryushan.

== See also ==
- Jainism in Kerala
