= Kidanganad =

- village
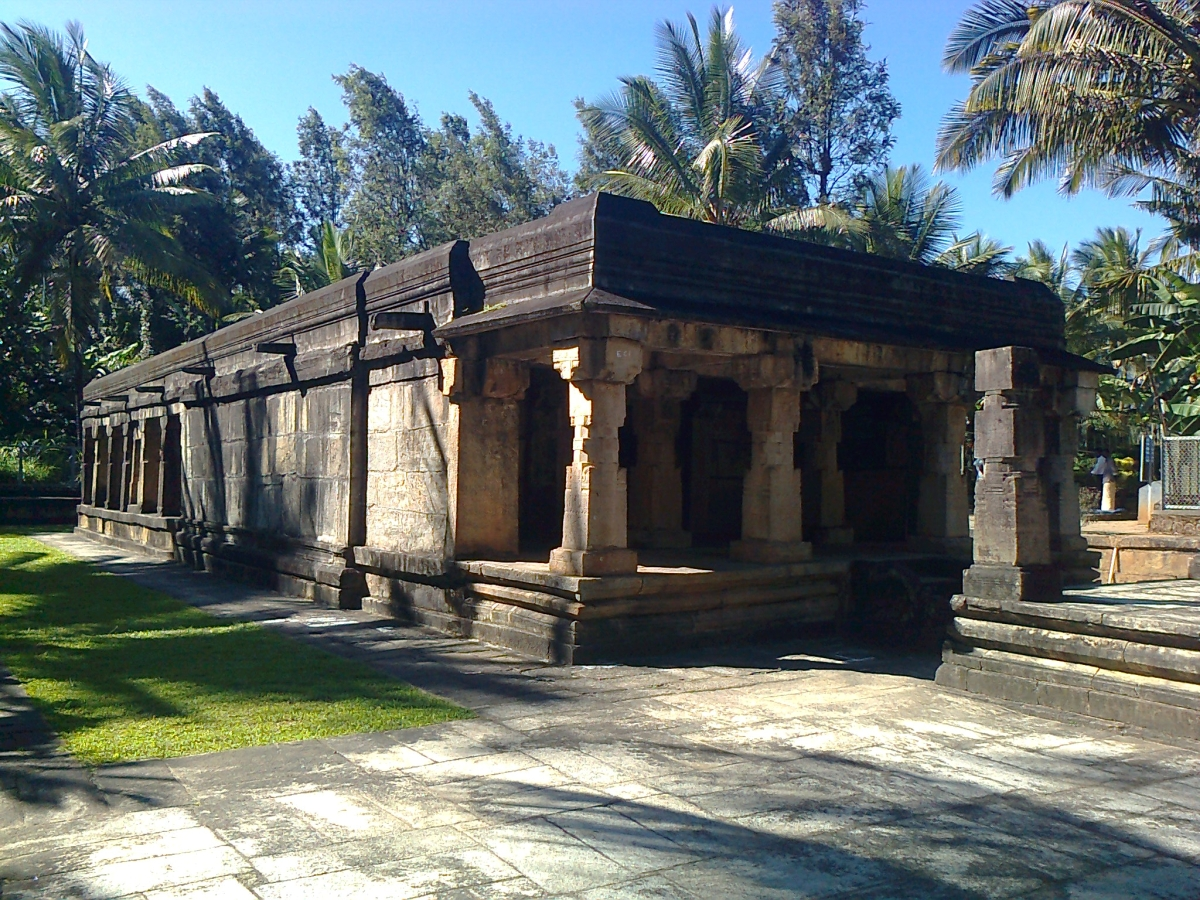
- Jain Basti
- Interactive map of Kidanganad
- Country: India
- State: Kerala
- District: Wayanad

Population (2011)
  - Total: 9,122

Languages
  - Official: Malayalam
- Time zone: UTC+5:30 (IST)
- PIN: 673592
- ISO 3166 code: IN-KL
- Vehicle registration: KL-73

Kidanganad is a village in Sultan Bathery in Wayanad district in the state of Kerala, India.

== Demographics ==
As of 2011 India census, Kidanganad had a population of 9,122, with 4,515 males and 4,607 females.

== Transportation ==
Kidanganad can be accessed from Sultan Battery. The Periya ghat road connects Mananthavady to Kannur and Thalassery. The Thamarassery mountain road connects Calicut with Kalpetta. The Kuttiady mountain road connects Vatakara with Kalpetta and Mananthavady. The Palchuram mountain road connects Kannur and Iritty with Mananthavady. The road from Nilambur to Ooty is also connected to Wayanad through the village of Meppadi.

The nearest railway station is at Mysore and the nearest airport is Kannur International Airport, located at 58 km.
