= Vadakkanthara =

- Suburb
- Location in Kerala, India Vadakkanthara (India)
- Coordinates: 10°46′0″N 76°38′0″E
- Country: India
- State: Kerala
- District: Palakkad

Government
  - Body: Palakkad Municipality

Languages
  - Official: Malayalam, English
- Time zone: UTC+5:30 (IST)
- PIN: 678012
- Vehicle registration: KL-09

Vadakkanthara is an area in Palakkad city, Kerala, India. It is located about 3 km from centre of city.Vadakkanthara is wards 43 and 50 of Palakkad Municipality.

== Religious sites ==
Thirupuraikkal Temple is a historical Hindu temple located in Vadakkanthara.
