= Jainamedu =

Jainamedu Jainimedu
- Neighbourhood
- Location in Kerala, India Jainamedu (India)
- Coordinates: 10°49′N 76°39′E
- Country: India
- State: Kerala
- District: Palakkad

Government
  - Body: Palakkad Municipality

Languages
  - Official: Malayalam, English
- Time zone: UTC+5:30 (IST)
- PIN: 678 012
- Telephone code: 0491
- Vehicle registration: KL-09
- Parliament constituency: Palakkad
- Assembly constituency: Palakkad

Jainamedu is a suburb or neighbourhood of Palakkad city, Kerala, India, and is located on the southern banks of the Kalapathy River. It is one of the western suburbs of Palakkad and is ward 51 of Palakkad Municipality.

It is best known as the 15-century Jain temple and is one of the few places in Kerala where the vestiges of Jainism have survived. Once, there were around 400 Jain families in Palakkad, but now only a few of them exist.
