= Śalākāpuruṣa =

63 illustrious people in Jainism

According to the Jain cosmology, the Śalākāpuruṣa (Sanskrit: शलाकापुरुष) "illustrious or worthy persons" are 63 illustrious beings who appear during each half-time cycle. They are also known as the triṣaṣṭiśalākāpuruṣa (63 illustrious persons). The Jain universal or legendary history is a compilation of the deeds of these illustrious persons. Their life stories are said to be most inspiring.

The śalākāpuruṣa comprise 24 Tirthankaras (Teaching Gods), twelve Chakravartin (universal monarchs, emperors of six continents), nine Balabhadras (gentle heroes), nine Narayanas (warrior heroes) and nine Prati-narayanas (anti-heroes). According to Jain cosmology, time is without beginning and eternal. The Kālacakra, the cosmic wheel of time, rotates ceaselessly. The wheel of time is divided into two half-rotations, Utsarpiṇī or ascending time cycle and Avasarpiṇī, the descending time cycle, occurring continuously after each other. Utsarpiṇī is a period of progressive prosperity and happiness where the time spans and ages are at an increasing scale while the Avasarpiṇī is a period of increasing sorrow and immorality with decline in time spans of the epochs. During each such time cycle, these 63 illustrious persons appear and establish the religion and order in society. According to Jain cosmology, since time is eternal, infinite kalacakras have elapsed and will occur in future and hence infinite sets of these 63 illustrious persons have appeared, and will appear, to establish order and religion in their respective eras.

== Origin and Etymology ==
The word salakapurusa is often translated as illustrious persons or worthy persons or mighty persons. It is derived from the Sanskrit compound of words salaka and purusa. "Purusa" means person, but "salaka" is of ambiguous etymology in this context. The primary meaning of the word salaka (Sanskrit: Śalākā, Pali: salākā, Prakrit: salāgā, salāyā) is "stick". In the Buddhist context it meant a ticket consisting of wooden sticks meant for voting or to distribute food; but in Jain context it was used to mean a stick and also a measurement and when combined with "purusa" to denote great heroes. According to 11th century Jain author, monk Acharya Hemachandra, these persons are called salaka as they have been specially marked among men. This emphasised that the names of the salakapurusas were underlined or specially significant due to their deeds. John Cort also quotes another author, S. D. Parekh, who emphasises the root meaning of voting sticks and concludes that a salakapurusa is a great person, as his greatness has been accepted by general public. Certain Śvētāmbara texts use the word Baladeva, Vāsudeva and Prativasudeva to refer Balabhadra, Narayana and Pratinarayana respectively. A 1975 treatise, detailing Mahavira's life and doctrine seems to imply the voting-etymology of the word, i.e. they are called salakapurusa, because they are men-that-count.

The tradition of salakapurusas or Jain universal history started with the biographies of the Tirthankaras. Kalpasutra gives the names and brief biographies of only tirthankaras. It does not use the word salakapurusas or mention them by name, but does say that the categories of Arihants, Chakravartins, Balabhadras and Vasudevas are always born in royal families, thus foreshadowing 54 of the 63 salakapurusas. Furthermore, Jaini traces the origin of list of Baladeva and Vasudeva to the Jinacharitra (lives of the Jinas) by Bhadrabahu (3–4th century BCE). A notable hagiography of these individuals is Hemachandra's Triṣaṣṭiśalākāpuruṣacaritra.

The following Jain texts chronicle the deeds of the salakapurusas:

=== Digambara texts ===
- Satkhandagama (1st century) – This gives a description of Jain universal history in a rudimentary form.
- Tiloya Panatti by Yativṛṣabha (7th century) – This text gives descriptions of other Jain heroes i.e. 9 Naradas, 11 Rudras and 24 Kamadevas, but specifically states that there are only 63 salakapurusas.
- Adipurana by Acharya Jinasena and Gunabhadra (9th century) – This text is also known as Trisastilaksanamahapurana (The great purana describing 63 great heroes). By this time the number of heroes had come to be fixed at 63.
- Harivamsa Purana composed by Acharya Jinasena.

=== Śvētāmbara texts ===
- Kalpasutra – Devoted mainly to stories of Rishabhanatha, Neminatha, Parshvanatha and Mahavira. It names other tirthankaras and also mentions the categories of Chakravartins, Baldeva and Vasudeva without giving individual names.
- Samavayanga Sutra – This text gives description of sixty-three and fifty-four salakapurusas in different places.
- Paumacarya' by Vimalsuri (2nd century) – This is the Jain version of Ramayana. The story of Rama the eighth Baladeva is narrated within the context of 63 salakapurusas. The later texts were influenced by Paumacarya.
- Cauppanamahapurisacariya by Silanka (9th century) – This narrates the deeds of fifty-four great heroes.
- Trisastisalakapurusacaritra by Hemacandra (11th century) – The deeds of 63 illustrious persons, and one of the most popular text of Jain universal history.
- Kahavali by Bhadresvara (13th century) – This text raised the number of salakapurusa to 72 by adding 9 Naradas.

All traditions of Jainism now agree to the figure of 63 salakapurusas. However, the number of persons is 60 as three persons (Shantinath, Kunthunath and Aranath) were Chakravartins who later on became Tirthankaras.

== Tirthankaras ==
Tīrthankaras (also known as Jinas) are Arhatas who are teachers and revivers of the Jain philosophy. There are 24 Tīrthankaras in each half time cycle; Mahāvīra was the 24th and last Tīrthankara of the current descending time cycle and Rishabhanatha was the first Tirthankara. Tīrthankaras are literally "the ford makers", who have shown the way to cross the ocean of rebirth and transmigration and hence have become a focus of reverence and worship amongst Jains. The Tirthankara provides all creatures with the means to liberate the soul from the confines of the body and to rise towards bliss, enlightenment and release from the eternal cycle of rebirth. He advocates continence, truth, non-violence, simplicity and purity for those who seek liberation. Tīrthankaras ultimately become Siddhas on liberation.

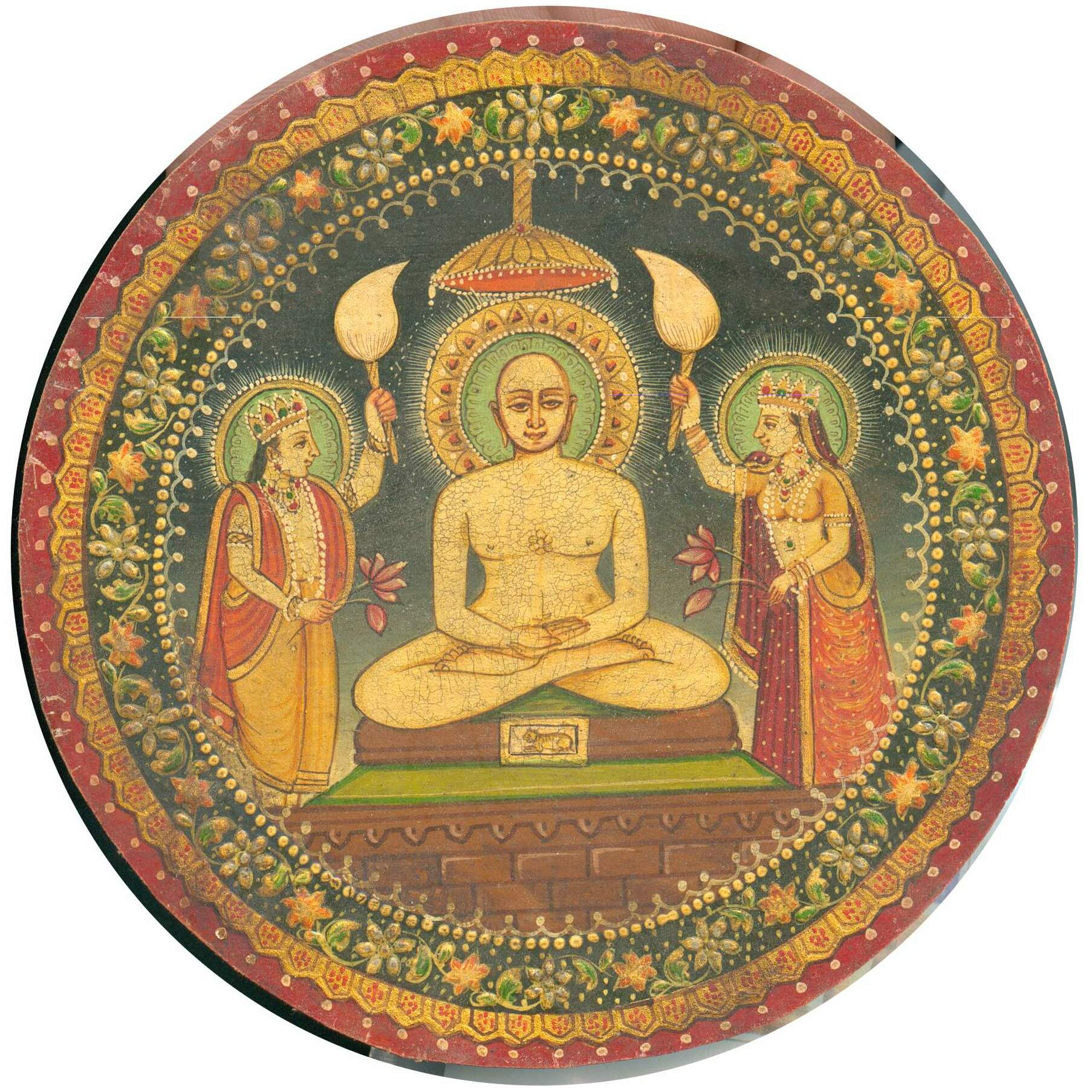
Mahavira was the last Tirthankara and Salakapurusa of this descending time cycle as per the Jain Universal History.

The twenty four Tīrthankaras of this descending time cycle are:

1. Rishabhanatha or Adinatha
2. Ajitanatha
3. Sambhavanatha
4. Abhinandanatha
5. Sumatinatha
6. Padmaprabha
7. Suparshvanatha
8. Chandraprabha
9. Pushpadanta
10. Shitalanatha
11. Shreyansanatha
12. Vasupujya
13. Vimalanatha
14. Anantanatha
15. Dharmanatha
16. Shantinatha
17. Kunthunatha
18. Aranatha
19. Mallinatha
20. Munisuvrata
21. Naminatha
22. Neminatha
23. Parshvanatha
24. Mahavira

== Chakravartin ==
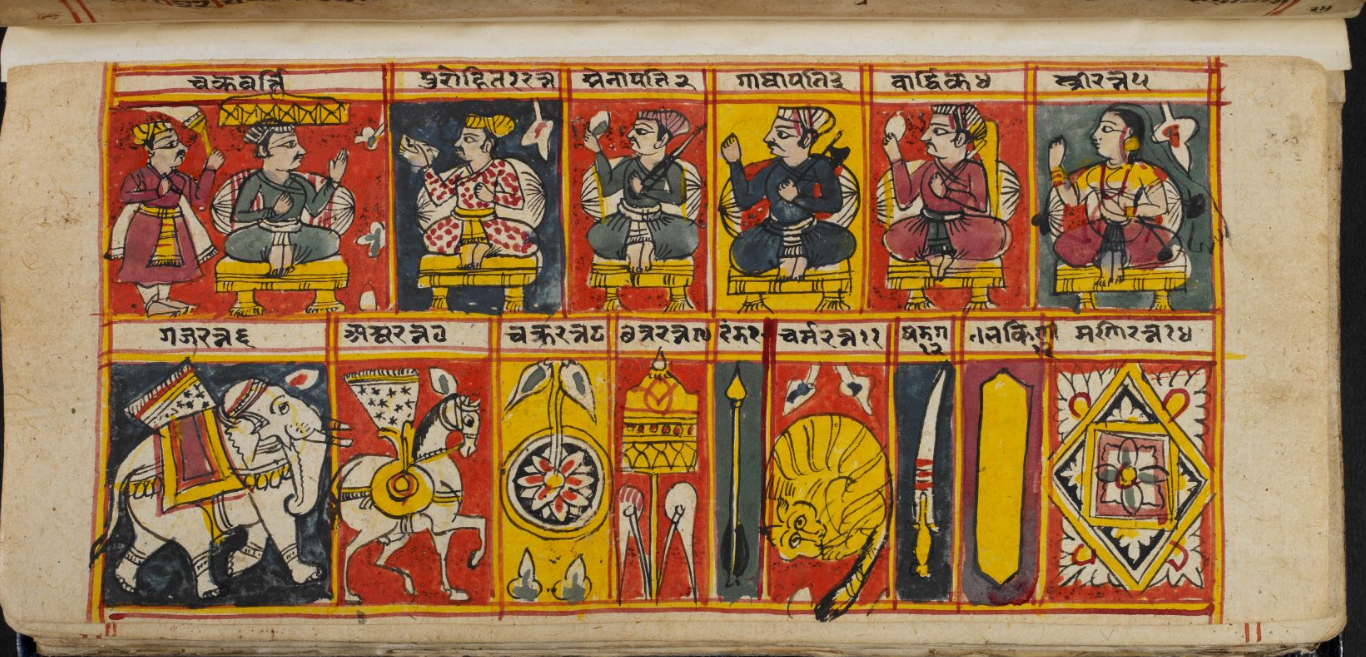
14 Ratna (jewels) of Chankravartin. Miniature from the 17th century, Saṁgrahaṇīratna by Śrīcandra, in Prakrit with a Gujarati commentary. Jain Śvetāmbara cosmological text with commentary and illustrations.

A Chakravartin (Universal Monarch) is the emperor of the world, lord of the material realm. Though he possesses worldly power, he often finds his ambitions dwarfed by the enormity of the cosmos. Jain purunas give a list of 12 Chakravartins who flourished in this descending time cycle. Golden in complexion, they all belonged to Kasyapa gotra. One of the greatest Chakravartis mentioned in Jain scriptures is Bharata in whose memory India came to be known as "Bharata-varsha". After conquering the whole world, King Bharata, brimming with pride, sought to inscribe his great feat on the slopes of Mount Meru. To his great dismay, he found the names of many other kings carved on Meru. Like him, they too had conquered the world. He was not the first man to do so. He was not the last. There were many before him, there were many after him. Bharata, humbled by the experience, returned to his kingdom to do his duty, aware that his actions were not unique and that his existence was not special. The names of the twelve Chakravartins as per Jain Texts are:

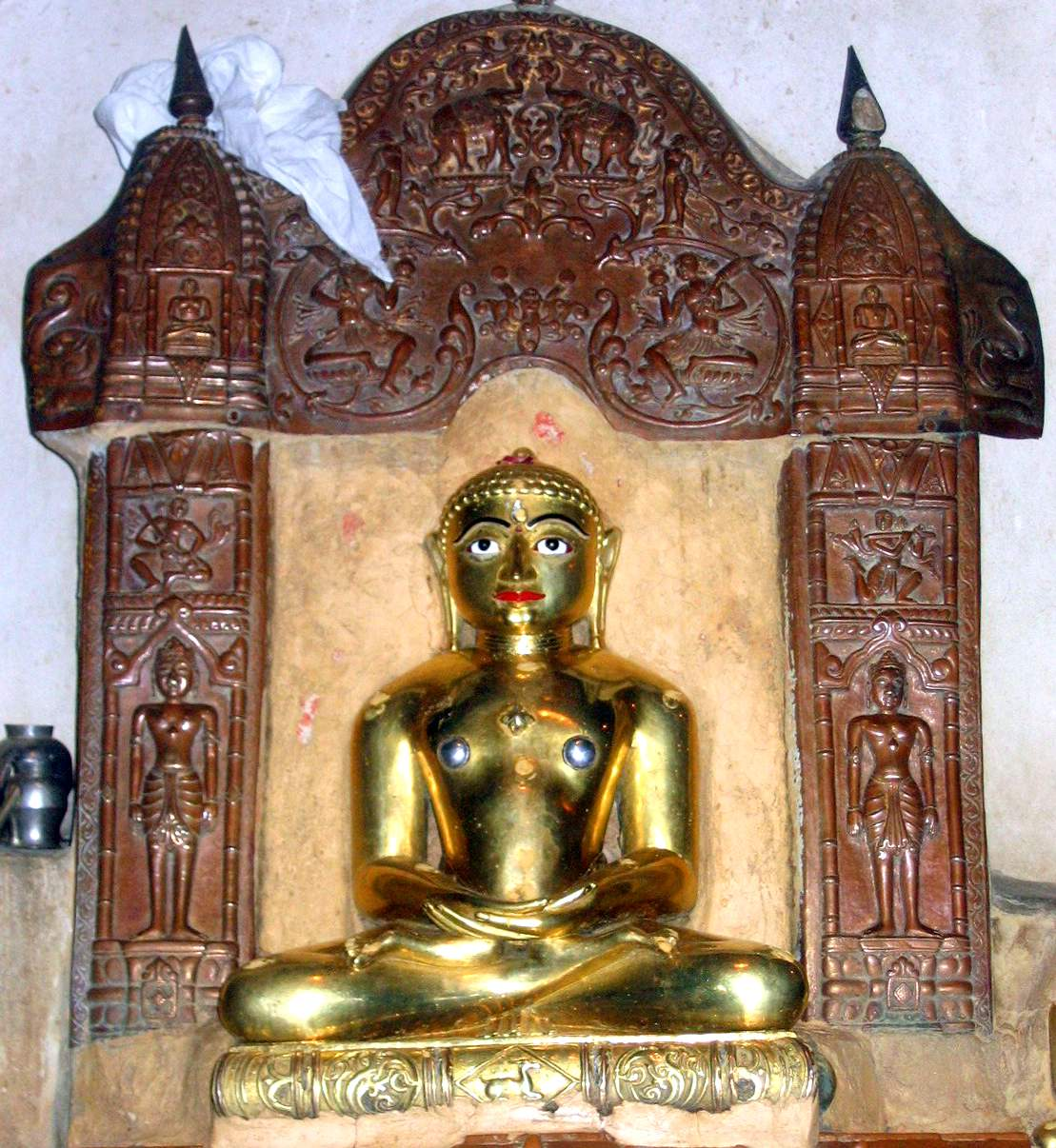
Lord Shantinatha, the sixteenth Jain Tirthankara was also a Chakravarti.

1. Bharata
2. Sagara
3. Maghava
4. Sanata Kumara
5. Shantinatha – (also a Tirthankara)
6. Kunthunatha – (also a Tirthankara)
7. Aranatha – (also a Tirthankara)
8. Subhauma
9. Padmanabha
10. Harishena
11. Jayasena
12. Brahmadatta

In Jainism, a chakravarti was characterised by possession of saptaratna, or "seven jewels":

1. Sudarshana Chakra, a miraculous wheel that never misses its target
2. Queen
3. Huge army of chariots
4. Jewellery
5. Immense wealth
6. Huge army of horses
7. Huge army of elephants

Some texts cite navaratna or "nine jewels" instead, adding "prime minister" and "son". Some texts even further expands to 14 Ratna, jewels.

== Triad of Baladeva, Vasudeva and Prativasudeva ==
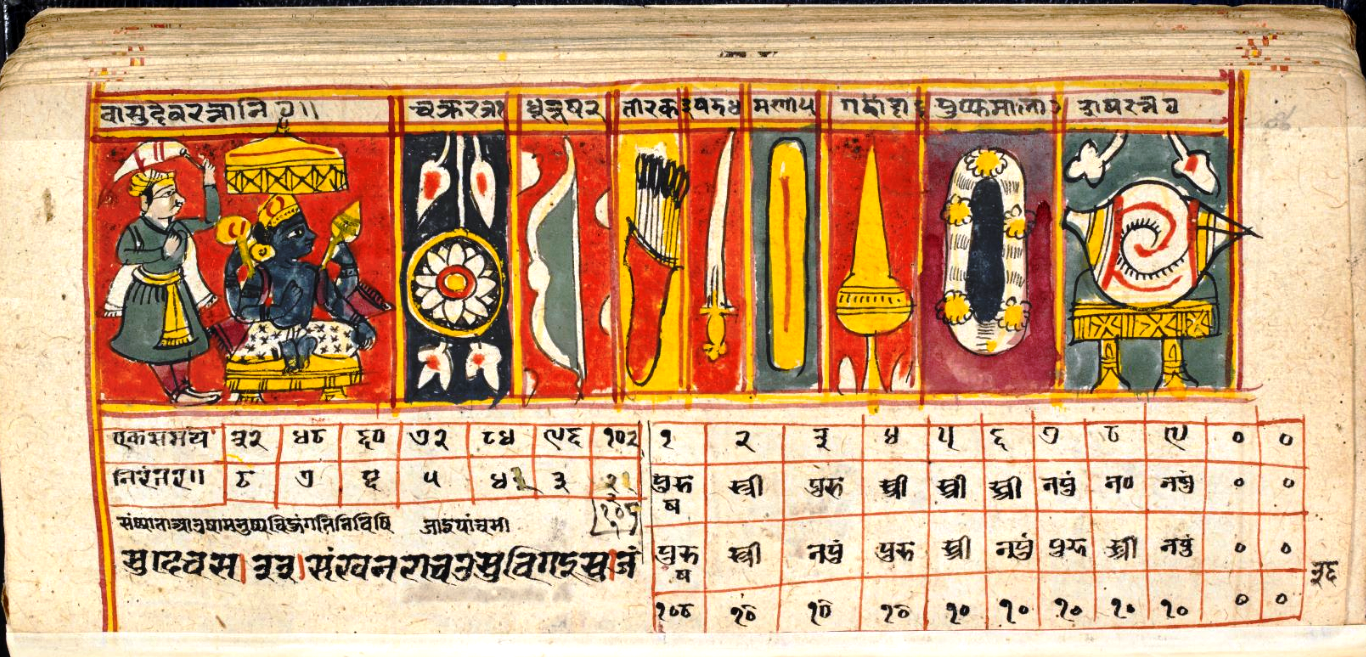
Weapons and symbols of Vasudeva or Narayana. Miniature from the 17th century, Saṁgrahaṇīratna by Śrīcandra, in Prakrit with a Gujarati commentary. Jain Śvetāmbara cosmological text with commentary and illustrations.

In every half time cycle, there are 9 sets of Balabhadras (gentle heroes), Vasudevas (violent heroes) and Prativāsudevas (anti-heroes). Unlike in the Hindu Puranas, the names Balabhadra and Narayana are not restricted to Balarama and Krishna in Jain puranas. Instead they serve as names of two distinct classes of mighty half brothers, who appear nine times in each half of the time cycles of the Jain cosmology and jointly rule half the earth as half-chakravarti. Ultimately Prati-naryana is killed by Narayana for his unrighteousness and immorality. Jaini traces the origin of this list of brothers to the Jinacaritra (lives of the Jinas) by Bhadrabahu swami (3–4th century BCE). Jain Ramayana is based on the stories of Rama, Lakshmana and Ravana who are the eighth Baladeva, Narayana, Pratinarayana and respectively. Similarly Harivamsa Purana is based on the stories of Balarama, Krishna and Jarasandha, who are the ninth and the last set of Balabhadra, Narayana, and Pratinarayana. However, the main battle is not the Mahabharata, but the fight between Krishna and Jarasandha who is killed by Krishna.

According to Jain texts, Narayana are generally of dark complexion and wear yellow garments. There are seven weapons and symbols of Narayana, namely: conch, discus (sudarshana chakra), club, bow, sword, jewel (kaustubha mani) and a garland of flowers (vanamala). Baladevas, half-brothers of Vasudevas, are described as fair in complexion and wear garments of dark blue and have a banner of palm tree. Their symbols or weapons are: bow, plough, pestle and arrow. The two brothers are inseparable and they jointly rule three continents as half-Chakravarti. Although Narayana is the mightier of the two, Balabhadra is depicted as superior for his non-violent ways and he achieves liberation. According to the Jain puranas, the Balabhadras lead an ideal Jain life. Out of nine Balabhadra, eight attain liberation and the last one goes to heaven. On the other hand, Narayana go to hell on account of their violent exploits, even though they did these in order to uphold righteousness.

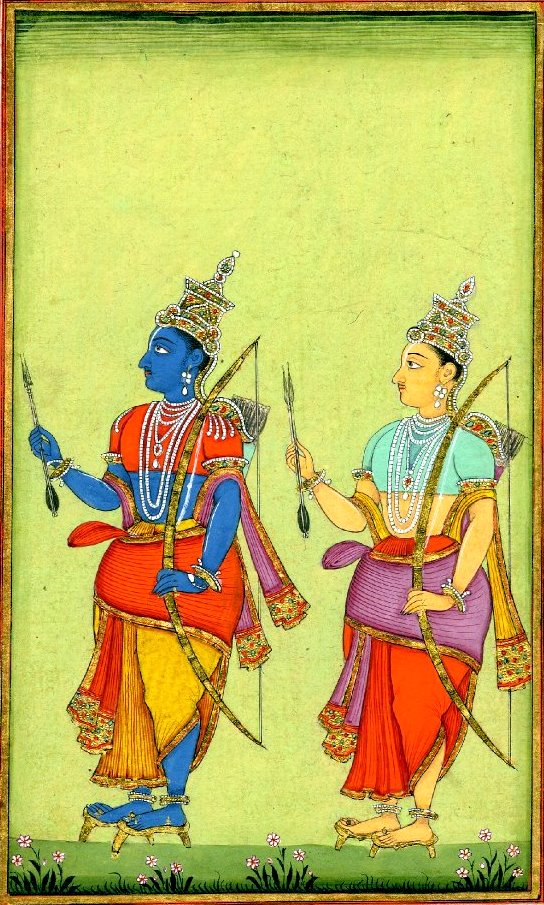
Rama and Lakshmana are the eighth set of Baladeva and Vasudeva according to the Jain universal history.

The list of Baladeva, Vasudeva and Prativasudeva are:

No.	Baladeva / Balabhadra	Vasudeva / Narayana	Prativasudeva / Pratinarayana
1	Acala	Tripushta (or Prishtha)	Asvagriva
2	Vijaya	Dvipushta (or Prishtha)	Taraka
3	Dharmaprabha (Bhadra)	Svayambhu	Naraka
4	Suprabha	Purushottama	Nisumbha
5	Sudarsana	Nara (Purusha) simha	Madhukatiabha
6	Nandi (Ananda)	Pundarika	Prahlada
7	Nandimitra (Mandana)	Dattadeva	Bali
8	Rama	Lakshmana	Ravana
9	Rama (Balarama)	Krishna	Jarasandha

== Hierarchy ==
Out of the above five classes of illustrious persons, Tirthankaras are placed at the top. They establish the religion and attain liberation. The Chakravarti attain liberation if they renounce their kingdom, or else go to hell if they indulge in sensual pleasures. Next in rank are Baladevas who are gentle heroes and devout laymen, who attain liberation corresponding to Tirthankaras. Vasudevas are also devout Jain laymen and ultimately attain liberation, but are first reborn in hell because of their violent actions.

The mother of a Tirthankara sees 16 auspicious dreams (14 dreams in some traditions) when the soul descends into her womb. The mother of a Vasudeva sees seven dreams, while that of a Balabhadra sees only four dreams. The mother of a Prati-vasudeva sees no dreams.

Certain Jain texts also depict the comparative powers of Salakapurusas in the following manner:

- A bull is as powerful as 12 warriors.
- A horse is as powerful as 10 bulls.
- A buffalo is as powerful as 12 horses.
- An elephant is as powerful as 15 buffalos.
- A lion with a mane is as powerful as 500 elephants.
- An octoped (Astapada mythical eight limbed animal) is as powerful as 2,000 maned lions.
- A Baldeva is as powerful as 1 million octopeds.
- A Vasudeva is as powerful as 2 Baldevs. (A Prati-vasudeva is slightly less powerful that a Vasudeva)
- A Chakravartin is as powerful as 2 Vasudevs.
- A Nagaraja (king of serpent gods) is as powerful as 100,000 Chakravartins.
- An Indra is as powerful as 10 million Nagarajas (kings of serpent gods).
- The power of innumerable Indras is insignificant as compared to that of the small finger of a Tirthankara.

== Other classes of heroes ==
In Jain universal history, other than these 63 Salakapurusa, there are other classes of 106 people who, though not depicted as salakapurusas, are important enough to be mentioned separately. They are:

- 9 Narada

No.	Name	Height	Lifespan (Total Age)	Narka
1	Bhima	80 dhanusha	84 lakh years	7th
2	Mahabhima	70 dhanusha	72 lakh years	6th
3	Rudra	60 dhanusha	60 lakh years	6th
4	Maharudra	50 dhanusha	30 lakh years	6th
5	Kala	45 dhanusha	10 lakh years	6th
6	Mahakala	29 dhanusha	65,000 years	6th
7	Durmukha	22 dhanusha	32,000 years	5th
8	Narakamukha	16 dhanusha	12,000 years	4th
9	Adhomukha	10 dhanusha	1,000 years	3rd

- 11 Rudras (Bhimabali, Jitasatru, Rudra, Visvanala, Supratishtha, Achala, Pundarika, Jitadhara, Jitanabhi, Pitha, Satyaki)
- 24 Kamdevas (Bahubali, Prajapati, Sridhara, Prasenacandra, Candravarna, Agniyukta, Sanatkumara, Vatsaraja, Kanakaprabha, Meghaprabha, Shantinatha, Kunthunatha, Arahanatha, Vijayaraja, Srichandra, Nalaraja, Hanuman, Baliraja, Vasudeva, Pradyumna, Nagakumata, Jivamdhara, Jambusvami)
- 24 Fathers of the Tirthankaras (For list refer Tirthankara Table)
- 24 Mothers of the Tirthankaras. (For list refer Tirthankara Table)
- 14 Kulakara (patriarchs) who teaches worldly deeds to people when Kalpavriksha declines as per Jain Cosmology

No.	Name	Wife	Height	Teaching	Lifespan (Total Age)
1	Pratisvati	Swyamprabha	1,800 dhanusha	eliminated fear (due to lack of knowledge) of Sun and Moon	87 lakh years
2	Sammati	Yashasvati	1,300 dhanusha	explained fear (due to lack of knowledge) Darkness and Stars	77 lakh years
3	Kshemamkara	Sunanda	800 dhanusha	company of carnivorous animals should be avoided	67 lakh years
4	Kshemamdhara	Vimla	775 dhanusha	defence from carnivorous animals	37 lakh years
5	Simamkare	Manohari	750 dhanusha	limit of Kalpavriksha	17 lakh years
6	Simamdhara	Yashodhara	725 dhanusha	division ownership over trees by marking	67,000 years
7	Vimalavahana	Sumati	700 dhanusha	how to ride an elephant, etc.	37,000 years
8	Chakshushment	Dharini	675 dhanusha	how to see a child's face	17,000 years
9	Yasasvin	Kaantmaala	650 dhanusha	how to name a child	1,200 years
10	Abhichandra	Shrimati	625 dhanusha	show a child the moon etc., when he cries	87 lakh years
11	Chandrabha	Prabhavati	600 dhanusha	defence of children	77 lakh years
12	Merudeve	Satya	575 dhanusha	transportation	67 lakh years
13	Prasenachandra	Amitmati	550 dhanusha	how to cure diseases	37 lakh years
14	Nabhi	Marudevi	525 dhanusha	how to cut umbilical cord	17 lakh years
