= Nabhi =

Father of Rishabhanatha

- 14th Kulakara
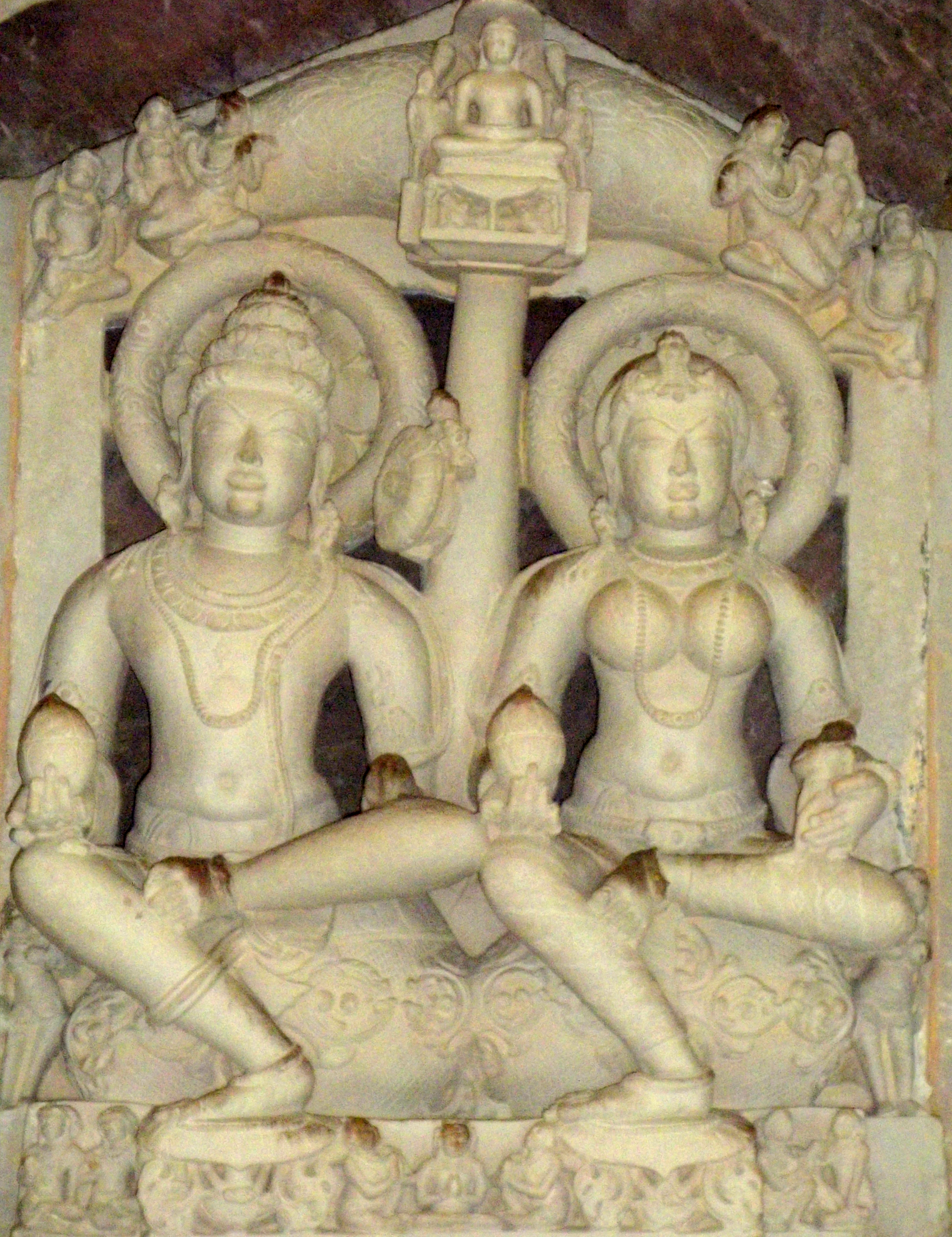
- Image of King Nabhi and Queen Marudevi (Photo: Khajuraho Museum, Madhya Pradesh, India)
- Other names: Nābhirāja
- Predecessor: Prasenachandra
- Height: 525 bows (1575 metres)
- Age: 17 lakh years (1700 000 yrs in Gregorian)

Genealogy
- Spouse: Marudevi
- Children: Rishabha

King Nabhi or Nabhi Rai was the 14th or the last Kulakara of avasarpini (the descending half of the cosmic time cycle in Jainism and the one in which the world is said to be at present). He was the father of Rishabhanatha, the first tirthankara (founder of Jainism) of present avasarpini. According to Jain text Ādi purāṇa, Nabhirāja lived for 1 crore purva and his height was 525 dhanusha (long bows).

According to Jain literature, India was known as Nābhivarṣa (land of Nabhi) before being renamed as Bhāratavarṣa after Bharata, the son of Rishabhanatha. This is also confirmed by Hindu Scriptures in the Srimad Bhagavatam Canto 5, Chapter 7, verse 3.

== Life ==
King Nabhi or Nabhi Rai was the fourteenth or the last Kulakara of avasarpini. (Note: According to Jain cosmology, when the third ara of the avasarpani (present descending half-cycle of cosmic age) was nearing its end, felicities due to ten type of Kalpavriksha (wish-fulfilling trees) started declining. Fourteen wise men called Kulakara arose from time to time to teach people how to perform the laborious activities for survival.) He taught the men how to cut the nabhi (navel chords) and organised them into social polity. Marudevi, queen of king Nabhi, saw the 14 auspicious dreams. When she shared her dreams with the king, he explained that she will give birth to a tirthankara. She then gave birth to Rishabhanatha, the first tirthankara of present avasarpini. According to Jain text Ādi purāṇa, Nabhirāja lived for 1 crore purva and his height was 525 dhanusha (long bows). Nabhi is depicted as one of the Manus in Bhagavata Purana. He is shown as the great-grandson of Svayambhuva, the first Manu.

According to Jain literature, India was known as Nābhivarṣa (land of Nabhi) before being renamed as Bhāratavarṣa after Bharata, the son of Rishabhanatha.

== See also ==
- Salakapurusa
