= Rishabhadeva (Hinduism) =

One of the avatars of Vishnu in the Bhagavata Purana

In Hinduism, Rishabha or Rishabhadeva is one of the twenty-four avatars of Vishnu in the Bhagavata Purana. He is said to have had 100 sons (including: Kukshi and Nimi) according to Hinduism.

== Vedic references and etymology ==
The name Rishabha appears in several early vedic texts. The context in the Rigveda, Atharvaveda and the Upanishads suggests that it means bull, sometimes "any male animal" or "most excellent of any kind".

Comparative religion scholar Sarvepalli Radhakrishnan (later President of India) argued that Rishabha was worshipped by the first century BCE and that the Yajurveda mentions three Tirthankaras: Rishabha, Ajitanatha and Arishtanemi

Examples of Rishabha appearing in the Vedic literature include verses 6.16.47 of Rigveda, 9.4.14–15 of Atharvaveda, 3.7.5.13 and 4.7.10.1 of Taittiriya Brahmana.

== Depiction in the Bhagavata Purana ==
Rishabha is described as a partial avatara of Vishnu, with an extended account of his life spanning four chapters of the fifth book of the Bhagavata Purana (5.3–5.6), detailing his divine birth, kingship, ascetic renunciation, and final departure from the world.

=== Divine birth and incarnation ===
The Bhagavata Purana presents five lists of Vishnu's avataras, and Rishabha is included in four of them, with only the shortest omitting his name.

He was born to King Nabhi and Queen Merudevi, although in an alternative account, his mother is named Sudevi. According to the text, King Nabhi was a virtuous but childless monarch who performed rigorous austerities and commissioned a grand sacrificial ritual to Vishnu for an heir. Pleased by his devotion, Vishnu is said to have incarnated through Nabhi’s wife with the purpose of exemplifying the dharma of celibate sramanas.

The Bhagavata Purana presents Rishabha as a divine figure from birth, telling the tale of how Indra once withheld rainfall out of envy for the prince, prompting Rishabha to miraculously generate rain himself. Thus, recognizing his divine nature, King Nabhi relinquished the throne and appointed Rishabha as king, entrusting him to the guidance of the brahmanas.

=== Kingship and family life ===
According to the Bhagavata, Rishabha first adopted the life of a student under a guru, setting an example of ideal conduct. After completing his education, he married Jayanti, who is described as a gift from a repentant Indra, and lived a model household life. He fathered one hundred sons, the eldest being Bharata, after whom the earth is said to have received its name. Though described as the eternal, self-satisfied Bhagavan, Rishabha undertakes worldly duties primarily to demonstrate dharma, which the text presents as neglected in that age. His rule is described as effective, bringing satisfaction to his subjects.

Valpey and Gupta note that although the Bhagavata Purana aligns with Jain traditions in portraying Rishabha as an ideal king and father of Bharata, it diverges by attributing key cultural innovations - such as agriculture and the varna system - not to Rishabha but to King Prithu, thereby presenting a more limited role for Rishabha as a culture hero in comparison to Jain accounts.

=== Renunciation and teachings ===
The Bhagavata recounts that Rishabha met his sons at a gathering of sages in Brahmavarta and instructed them in the values of renunciation and devotion. He emphasizes the rejection of sense gratification, describing it as characteristic of animal life, and advocates for austerity and spiritual association as means to purify the heart. A central theme in his monologue is the "knot of the heart" - attachment formed through conjugal and material bonds - which must be loosened to overcome the illusion of maya.

Rishabha outlines practical steps for spiritual advancement, including associating with devotees, following a spiritually elevated master, controlling the senses, and engaging in bhakti yoga. Notably, he expresses strong praise for brahmanas, portraying them as embodiments of the Vedas and declaring that food offered to them pleases him more than sacrificial offerings. This praise has been interpreted as part of the text’s effort to contrast Rishabha’s orthodoxy with the anti-Brahmanical views traditionally associated with Jainism.

After delivering his teachings, Rishabha is portrayed as exemplifying his own principles by crowning his son Bharata and renouncing the throne to pursue a life of complete detachment. He adopted the path of an avadhuta - wandering naked, with unbound hair, and maintaining a vow of silence, appearing to others as if mad or senseless.

== In Hindu architecture ==
The eighth-century Pallava-era Vaikuntha Perumal Temple features carved panels along the temple that align with the narratives of Canto Five of the Bhagavata Purana and are found on the north side of the temple porch (ardhamandapa). According to American scholar Dennis Hudson, the relief work on the temple depicts the yagna performed by King Nabhi and his wife Merudevi, and the appearance of the four-armed Yajnapurusha ("Person of the Sacrifice") emerging from the flames to announce that a portion of Vishnu will be born as their son, Rishabha. In the subsequent panel, this same divine figure, the Yajnapurusha, appears within the heart of King Bharata, Rishabha's eldest son, as a symbol of Bharata's spiritual transformation and renunciation.

== Comparison with Jain tradition ==
According to John E. Cort and other scholars, there is a considerable overlap between Jain and Hindu Vaishnava traditions in the western parts of India, with Hindus adopting Jain sacred figures in Hindu texts like Rishabha and his son Bharata to absorb the nomenclature of the land.

== See also ==
- Bharata (Jainism)
