= Marudevi =

- Mother of Rishabhanatha
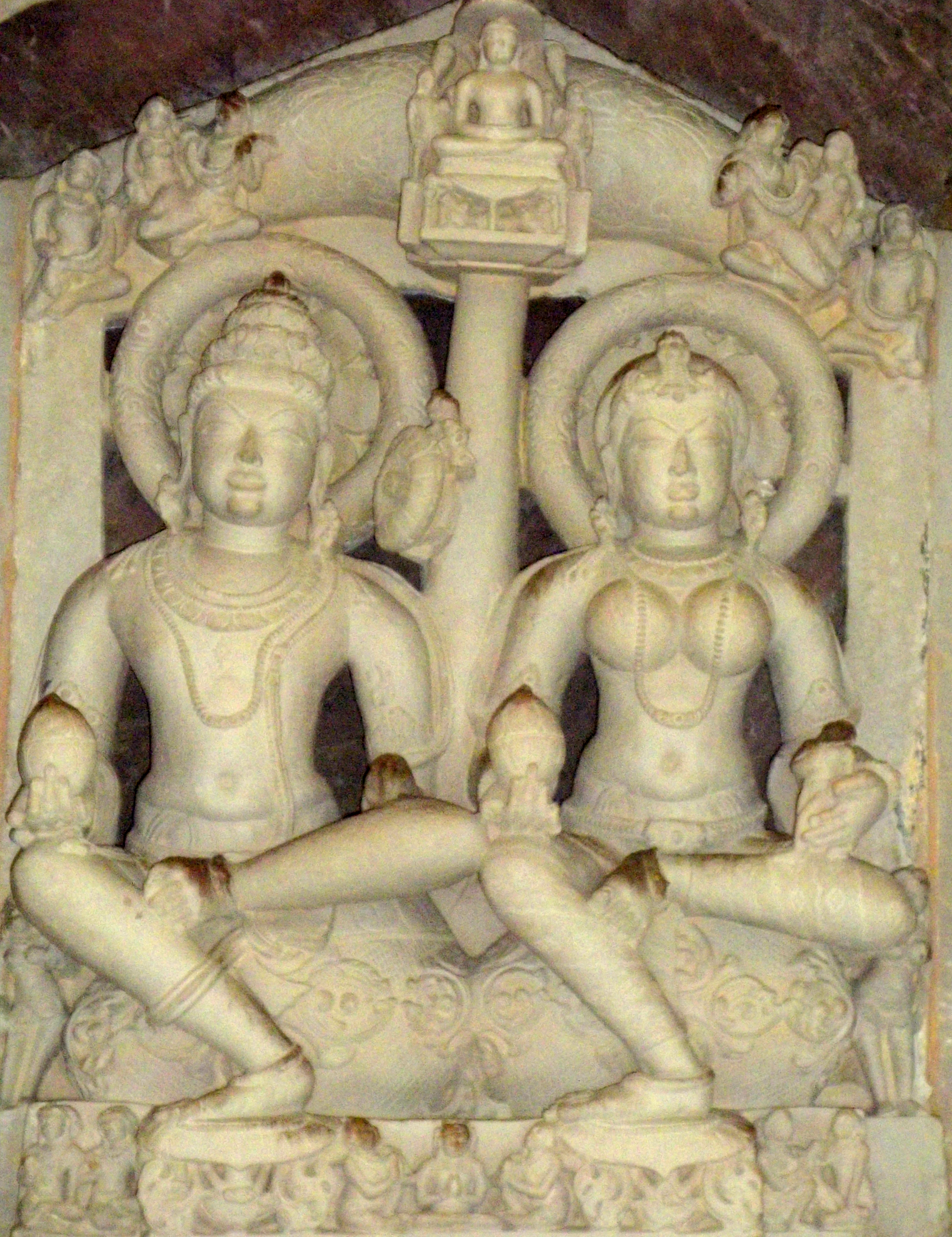
- Image of king Nabhi and mother Marudevi in Khajuraho museum, Khajuraho, Madhya Pradesh
- Other names: Mata Marudevi

Genealogy
- Spouse: Nabhi
- Children: Rishabha

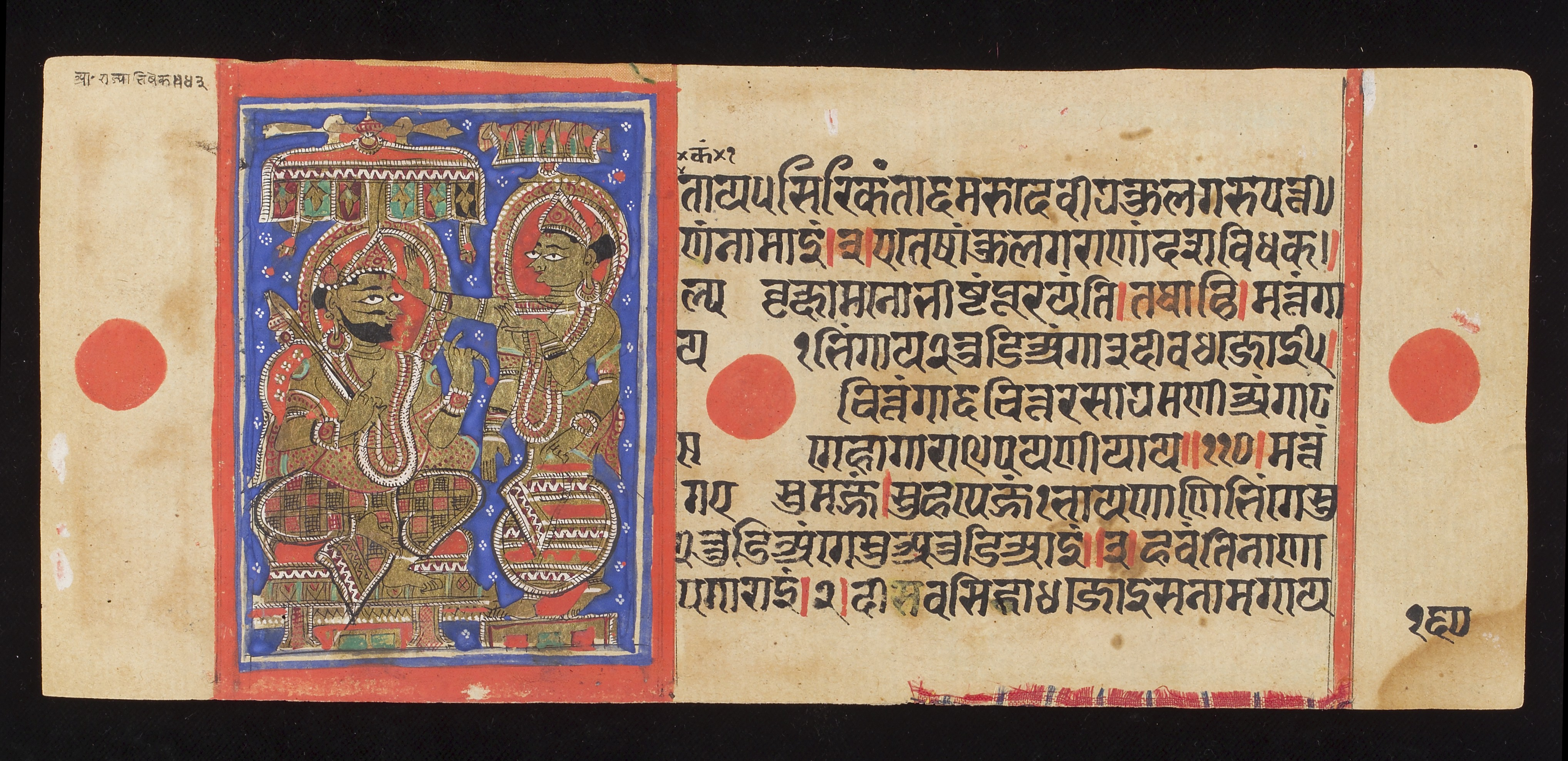
Nabhi and Marudevi, Kalpasutra, Wellcome Collection, London

Marudevī was the mother of the first Jain Tirthankara, Rishabhanatha and the queen of King Nabhi. According to the Śvetāmbara canon, she was the first person to have attained Moksha in the current Avasarpiṇī.

== Birth of Rishabhanatha ==
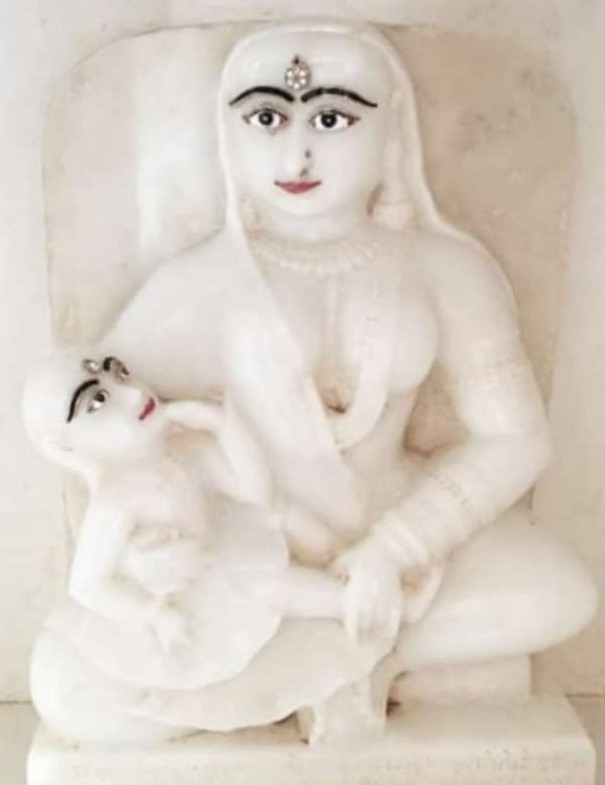
An idol of Rishabha with mother Marudevi at Palitana

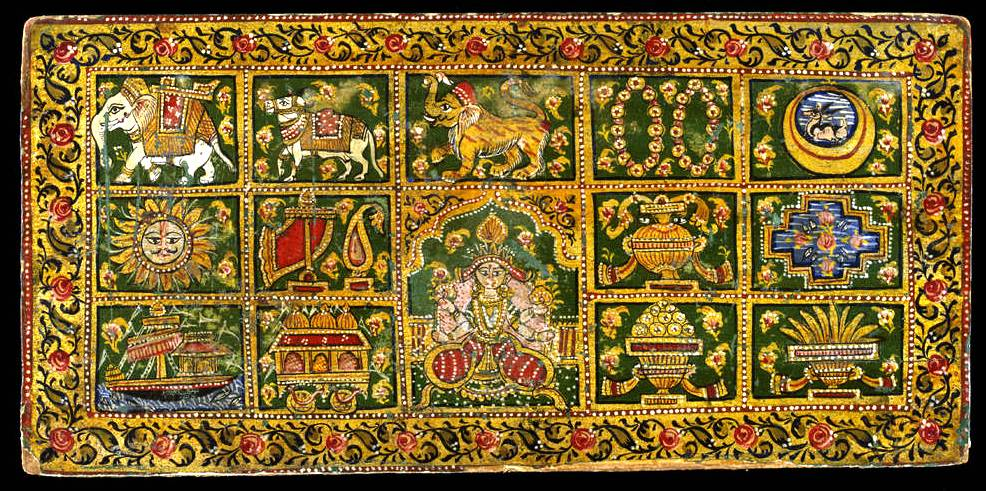
Auspicious dreams as an ornamentation on cover of 19th-century manuscript

The enlivening of the embryo through the descent of the future Tīrthankara's soul in the mortal body is celebrated as Garbha Kalyānaka At this time, Queen Marudevi dreamt fourteen auspicious dreams (Śvetāmbara belief) or sixteen auspicious dreams (Digambara belief). According to Digambara accounts, King Nabhirāja, who was endowed with clairvoyance, explained the significance of these dreams to her in the morning. As per Śvetāmbara monk, Acharya Hemachandrasuri's Triṣaṣṭiśalākāpuruṣacarita, celestial beings, including Indra, interpreted and explained the meaning of these dreams to Queen Marudevi as described below: -

| Dreams (According to Śvetāmbara tradition) | Interpretation by Indra |
|---|---|
| 1. A mighty white bull with a long tail and massive shoulders | A son who would propagate dharma would be born to her |
| 2. A four-tusked mighty white elephant | Her son would be the greatest and the holder of the greatest power |
| 3. A red-eyed, long-tongued lion | Her son would be like a fearless lion |
| 4. The goddess who rests on a lotus being adorned by pitchers of water lifted by trunks of elephants | Her son would be the best of men with glory of the demi-goddess of jewels |
| 5. A wreath of flowers from divine trees twisted together | Her son would be auspicious and his orders would be followed by one and all |
| 6. A moon orb, flooded with light | Her son would be pleasing and joy to the eyes |
| 7. A blazing sun, creating an illusion of day during the night | Her son would be the creator of light and destroy the darkness of delusion |
| 8. A flag staff with a chain of bells | Her son would be the founder of a great lineage (Ikshvaku) |
| 9. A golden pitcher full of water and covered by lotuses | Her son would be filled with all supernatural powers |
| 10. A pond full of lotuses as if it were to praise the baby Tirthankara | Her son would take away the pain of everyone stuck in the worldly life of temporary pleasures |
| 11. An ocean of milk that pleases the mind | Her son would be accessible as well as inaccessible |
| 12. A lustrous heavenly palace such as the abode of celestial beings | Her son would be worshipped by everyone, including the celestial beings who stay in such palaces |
| 13. A collection of precious jewels that resembled the radiance as exhibited by the stars in the sky | Her son would be a heap of jewels of all virtues |
| 14. A smokeless fire that resembles the brilliance of all such objects in the Universe combined together entering her mouth | Her son would absorb the radiance of all other divine beings |

The interpretation of 16 dreams as believed by the Digambara sect is as follows: -

| Dreams (According to Digambara traditions) | Interpretation by Nābhirāja (He refers to Rishabhanatha) |
|---|---|
| 1. A white mighty elephant the sound of whose voice was like thunder and whose trunk was moist with temple-fluid. | He will be the preceptor of the preceptors, to be worshiped by the devas. |
| 2. A magnificent bull, whiter than the petals of the lotus and having a beautiful form. | The dream foretold the birth of a great religious Teacher who would spread the light of knowledge. |
| 3. A ferocious, white lion possessing immense strength and with thick cluster of hairs on the neck. | He will be strong as the lion, in overcoming all enemies. |
| 4. Goddess Lakshmi’s anointment (abhiśeka) with water out of golden pitchers, by two large guardian elephants. | He will be the Supreme Being in the three worlds and that the devas will perform his abhiśeka at Mount Meru. |
| 5. Two garlands of fragrant flowers over which were hovering black bees intoxicated with the fragrance. | He will be the Founder of true Faith whose fragrance will spread all-around |
| 6. Full moon surrounded by stars. | He will bring soothing peace and happiness to all beings |
| 7. Sight of the radiant, rising sun in the east, obscuring the lustre of all other lights. | He will dispel the darkness of ignorance |
| 8. The eighth dream saw two fishes playing gloriously in a lovely pool of water, full of lotuses. | He will bring propitious outcomes for all living beings. |
| 9. She saw two golden pitchers with lotuses on the top. | He will possess the treasure of superior qualities, including excellent meditation. |
| 10. She saw an effulgent lake filled with water shining like liquid gold due to the floating remains of yellow lotus leaves | He will have the most auspicious form and body. |
| 11. She saw an ocean whose strong waves were breaking into small white sprays. | He will attain superior nine accomplishments (navalabdhi) and omniscience. |
| 12. She then saw a very big, resplendent, golden throne set with bright diamonds and rubies. | He will become the World Teacher |
| 13. The thirteenth dream was the sight of a jewel-bedecked heavenly plane of the devas which shone like the morning sun. | He will descend from the heaven to take birth on this earth. |
| 14. The next dream was the rising residence of Nāgendra, the lord of the devas of the Nāgakumāra clan. | He will be born with clairvoyance |
| 15. A very large heap of glittering jewels whose brightness illuminated the sky. | He will be the embodiment of Right Faith, Right Knowledge and Right Conduct. |
| 16. The last dream was the sight of a blazing, bright fire with smokeless flame. | He will burn up the entire karmas associated with His soul with the fire of pure meditation. |

After these sixteen dreams she saw a large, beautiful bull entering her open mouth, indicative of a pious and extraordinary soul entering her womb.

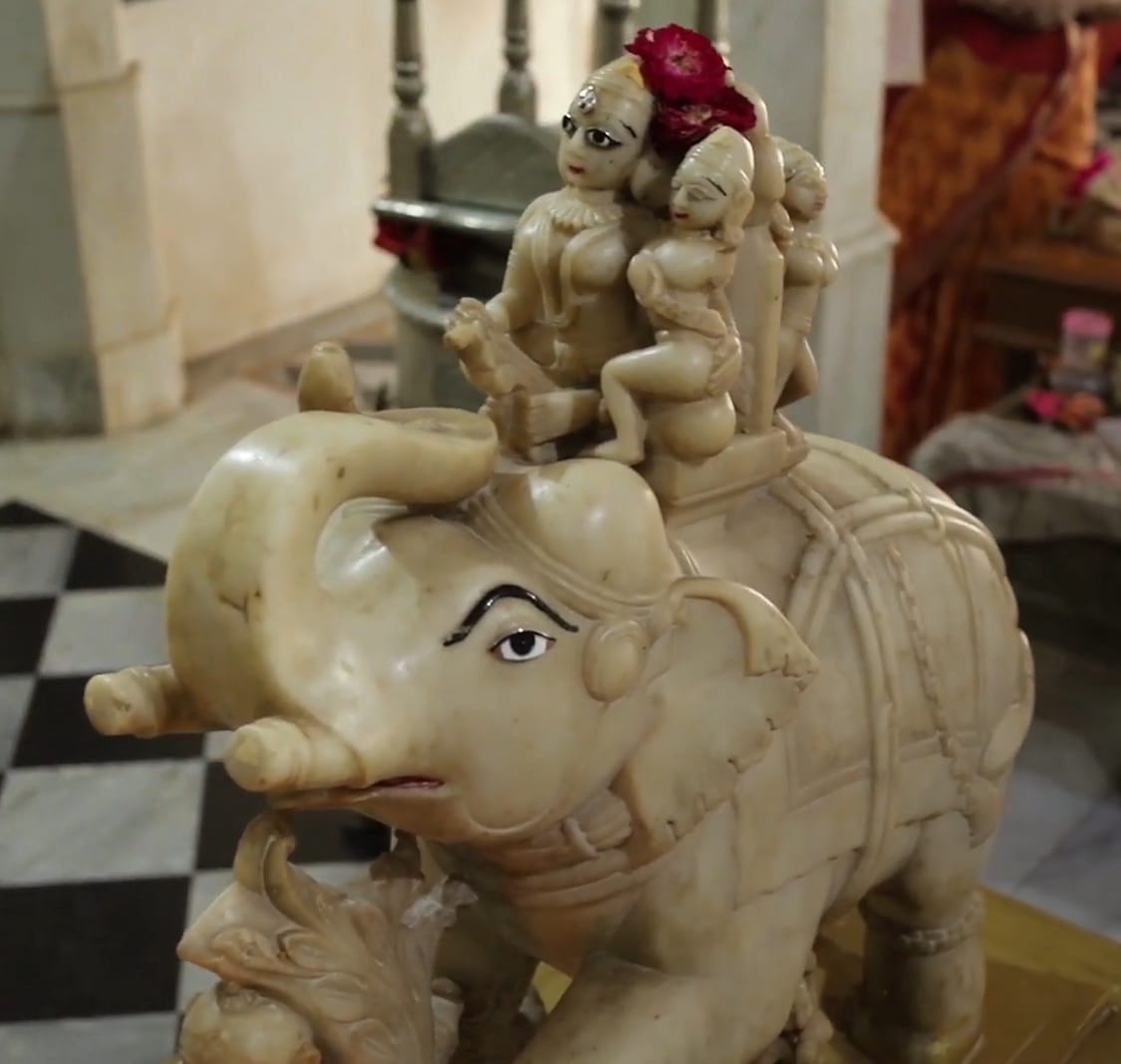
Idol of Marudevi sitting on an Elephant, when she attained Omniscience & Moksha

== Omniscience & salvation ==
As per the Śvetāmbara tradition, Marudevi attained moksha while sitting on an elephant. According to the Śvetāmbara canon, Marudevi’s eyesight had become weak after she constantly cried in pain of separation from her son Rishabhanatha. One day, Bharata came to meet Marudevi, his paternal grandmother and then, they received the news that Rishabhanatha had attained omniscience. Upon hearing the news, Bharata told Marudevi, “Oh my grandmother let me show you the glory of your son Rishabha”. Bharata then mounted Marudevi on an elephant and accompanied her to Purimatala City, where the samavasarana of Rishabha was established by demigods. Bharata started narrating the glory and splendor of Rishabha and how the demigods were present at his service. After hearing the glory of her son, tears of joy rolled out of Marudevi’s eyes which healed her weakened eyesight and she saw her son sitting on a throne inside samavasarana with millions of demigods at his service. At the same time, she noticed that despite having such a grand splendor, her son wasn’t interested in all these materialistic things and he also didn’t show any attachment towards his mother, Marudevi. Upon witnessing this, she got self-realization, she destroyed all her karmas and attained omniscience. At the very next moment, she attained moksha simultaneously while she was still sitting on the elephant. The demigods immersed her body in the ocean of milk to perform the final rites. Śvetāmbara canon says that Marudevi was the first person in this Avasarpini to attain salvation.

== In literature ==
Marudevi is mentioned in the Hindu scripture Bhagavata Purana as mother of Rishabhanatha.

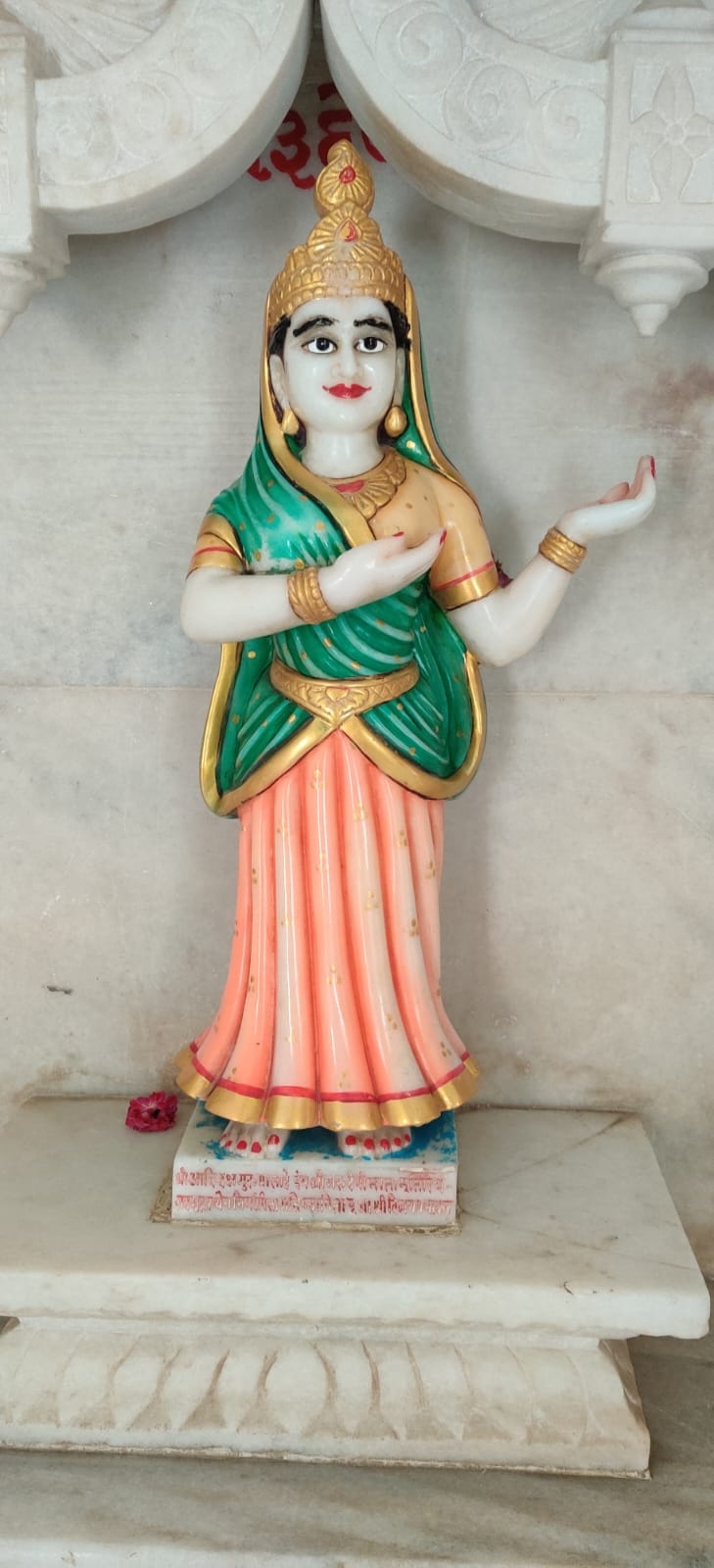
Idol of Queen Marudevi at Shree Samavasarna Śvetāmbara Maha Mandir, Aagashi, Palghar, Maharashtra

== See also ==
- Ajitanatha
- Haribhadra (Jain philosopher)
- Swayamprabhasuri
