= Ratnakaravarni =

Ratnakavarni The Jain Poet of Karnataka

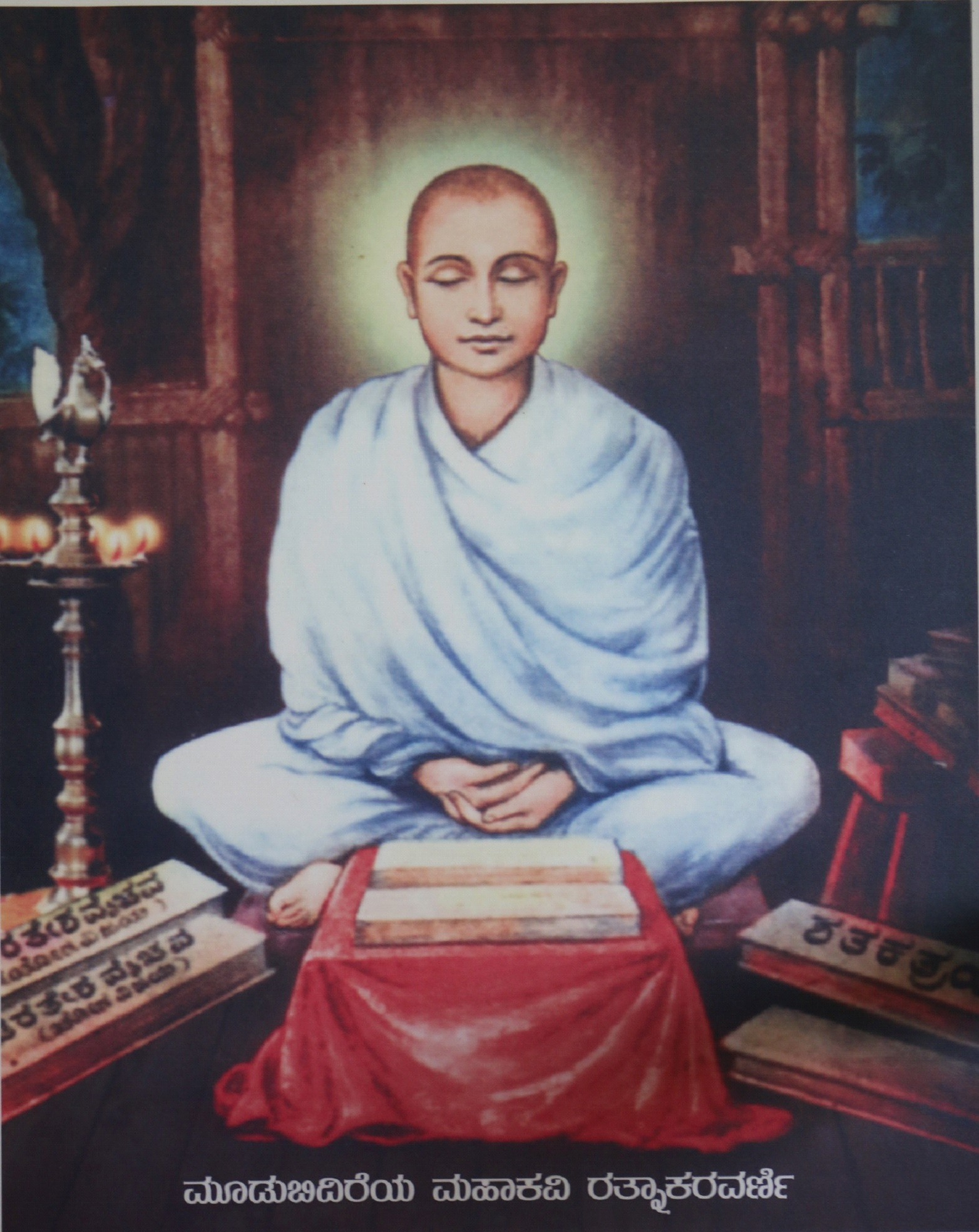
- Mahakavi Rathnakaravarni

Personal life
- Born: c. 1500 Karnataka, India
- Died: c. 1560 Karnataka, India
- Notable work(s): "Bharatesha Vaibhava", "Ratnakarashataka"
- Occupation: Poet, writer

Religious life
- Religion: Jainism

Religious career
- Period in office: 16th century

Ratnakaravarni was a 16th-century Kannada Jain poet and writer. He is considered to be one of the trailblazers in the native shatpadi (hexa-metre, six line verse) and sangatya (composition meant to be sung to the accompaniment of musical instrument) metric tradition that was popularised in Kannada literature during the rule of the Vijayanagara Empire in modern Karnataka. His most famous writing is the story of the Jain prince Bharata and is called the Bharatesha Vaibhava (or Bharatesvara Charite). Known to be a troubled and restless person, tradition has it that Ratnakaravarni converted from his religion Jainism to Veerashaivism when a less-meritorious poet superseded him. During this brief time, he wrote the Basavapurana, a biography of the 12th century social reformer Basavanna. Later, he returned to the Jain religion and penned classics in the shataka metre (string of 100 verses). His contributions to Kannada literature are considered trend setting.

== Life and works ==
Ratnakaravarni of Mudabidri (c. 1557) was a court poet under the patronage of Bhairasa Wodeyar at Karkala, modern coastal Karnataka, and is famous for successfully integrating an element of worldly pleasure into asceticism and for treating the topic of erotics with discretion in a religious epic, his magnum opus, the Bharatesha Vaibhava. One of the most popular poets of Kannada literature, his writings took to a fine line between the royal court and conservative monastery. His writings were popular across religions and sects for their secular appeal. In fact, an early 19th-century writing recognises him as an authority on erotics and the science of pleasure, rather than a poet with a spiritual bent. A radical and sensitive poet, he once claimed that spiritual meditation "was boring". Tradition has it that Ratnakaravarni converted to Veerashaivism when his magnum opus was initially scorned at (after a poet called Ravikirthi objected to a few verses in it) only to return to the Jain fold and pen other important writings. Written in epic proportions, the Bharatesha Vaibhava is in eighty cantos and runs into 10,000 verses. His other important writings are the 2,000 spiritual songs called Annagalapada ("Songs of the Brothers") and three shatakas: the Ratnakara sataka, the Aparajitesvara shataka, a discourse on Jain morals, renunciation and philosophy and the Trilokya shataka, an account of the universe as seen by Jains, consisting of heaven, hell and the intermediate worlds .

== Magnum opus ==
Bharatesha Vaibhava is a version of the earlier Poorvapurana by Jinasenacharya and brings out a different perspective compared to the Adipurana written by Adikavi Pampa in c.941. Centered on the glorification of the enlightened Bharata, the son of the first Jain Tirthankar Adinatha, Ratnakaravarni cleverly focusses on those aspects that the original by Pampa ignored. Ratnakaravarni goes into minute details about prince Bharata, who according to the author serves as the ideal balance between detachment (yoga) and attachment (bhoga). Though married to "96,000 women", Bharata is depicted as one who at once can separate himself from worldly pleasures. Unlike Pampa who focussed on the conflict between the brothers, Bahubali and Bharata, ending with Bahubali's asceticism and Bharata's humiliation, Ratnakaravarni's eulogy of Bharata leaves room only for Bahubali's evolution towards sainthood. Eventually, Bharata attains moksha by burning himself in ascetic fire. The author showers encomium on Bharata in his various roles as a monarch, husband, son, friend and a devotee, a rare description of a "perfect human being" among Jain writings. Since details of the early life of Bharata as a young ruler did not exist in previous writings or in tradition, much of Ratnakaravarni's vivid description of that period was a product of his imagination. This work finds its pride of place in Kannada's epic poetry for being the lengthiest poem in the folk sangatya metre.
