= Jain cosmology =

Description of the universe in Jain texts

Jain cosmology is the description of the shape and functioning of the Universe (loka) and its constituents (such as living beings, matter, space, time etc.) according to Jainism. Jain cosmology considers the universe as an uncreated entity that has existed since infinity with neither beginning nor end. Jain texts describe the shape of the universe as similar to a man standing with legs apart and arms resting on his waist. This Universe, according to Jainism, is broad at the top, narrow at the middle and once again broad at the bottom.

== Six eternal substances ==
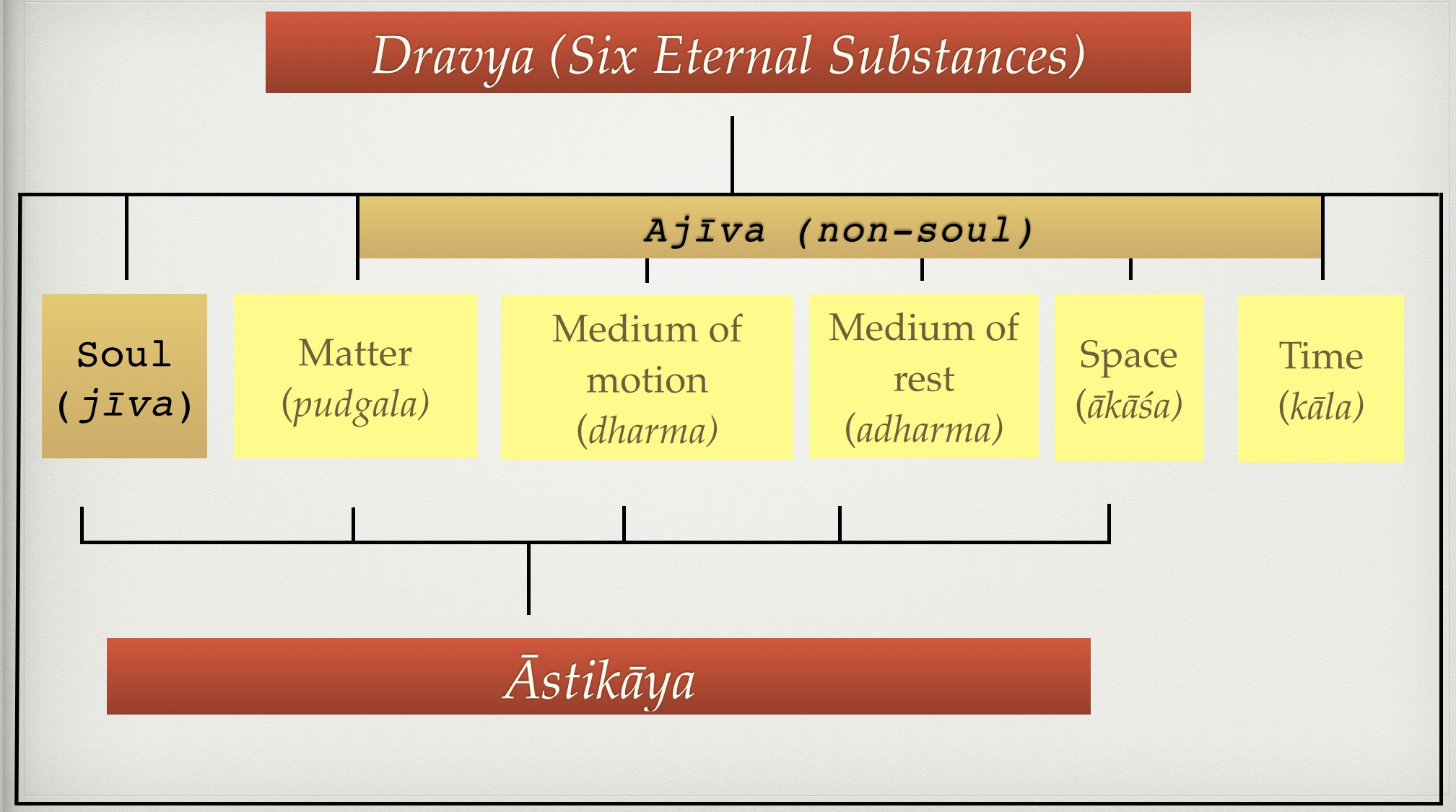
Chart showing the classification of dravya and astikaya

According to Jains, the Universe is made up of six simple and eternal substances called dravya which are broadly categorized under Jiva (Living Substances) and Ajiva (Non Living Substances) as follows:

Jīva (Living Substances)

- Jīva i.e. Souls – Jīva exists as a reality, having a separate existence from the body that houses it. It is characterised by chetana (consciousness) and upayoga (knowledge and perception). Though the soul experiences both birth and death, it is neither really destroyed nor created. Decay and origin refer respectively to the disappearing of one state of soul and appearing of another state, these being merely the modes of the soul. Jiva are classified on bases of sense, so there are of 5 types: 1) with one sense (sparshendriya) 2) 2 senses (1st included and raasendriya) 3) 3 senses (1st 2 included and dharnendriya) 4) 4 senses (1st 3 included and chkshuendriya) 5) 5 senses (1st 4 included and shrotendriya)

Ajīva (Non-Living Substances)

- Pudgala (Matter) – Matter is classified as solid, liquid, gaseous, energy, fine Karmic materials and extra-fine matter i.e. ultimate particles. Paramāṇu or ultimate particle is the basic building block of all matter. The Paramāṇu and Pudgala are permanent and indestructible. Matter combines and changes its modes but its basic qualities remain the same. According to Jainism, it cannot be created, nor destroyed.
- Dharmastikāya or Dharma-dravya (Principle of Motion) and Adharmastikāya or Adharma-dravya (Principle of Rest) – Dharmastikāya and Adharmastikāya are distinctly peculiar to Jaina system of thought depicting the principle of Motion and Rest. They are said to pervade the entire universe. Dharmastikāya and Adharmastikāya are by itself not motion or rest but mediate motion and rest in other bodies. Without Dharmastikāya motion is not possible and without Adharmastikāya rest is not possible in the universe.
- Ākāśa (Space) – Space is a substance that accommodates the living souls, the matter, the principle of motion, the principle of rest and time. It is all-pervading, infinite and made of infinite space-points.
- Kāla (Time) – Kāla is an eternal substance according to Jainism and all activities, changes or modifications can be achieved only through the progress of time. According to the Jain text, Dravyasaṃgraha:
  Conventional time (vyavahāra kāla) is perceived by the senses through the transformations and modifications of substances. Real time (niścaya kāla), however, is the cause of imperceptible, minute changes (called vartanā) that go on incessantly in all substances.
  — Dravyasaṃgraha (21)

== Universe and its structure ==
Structure of Universe according to the Jain scriptures.

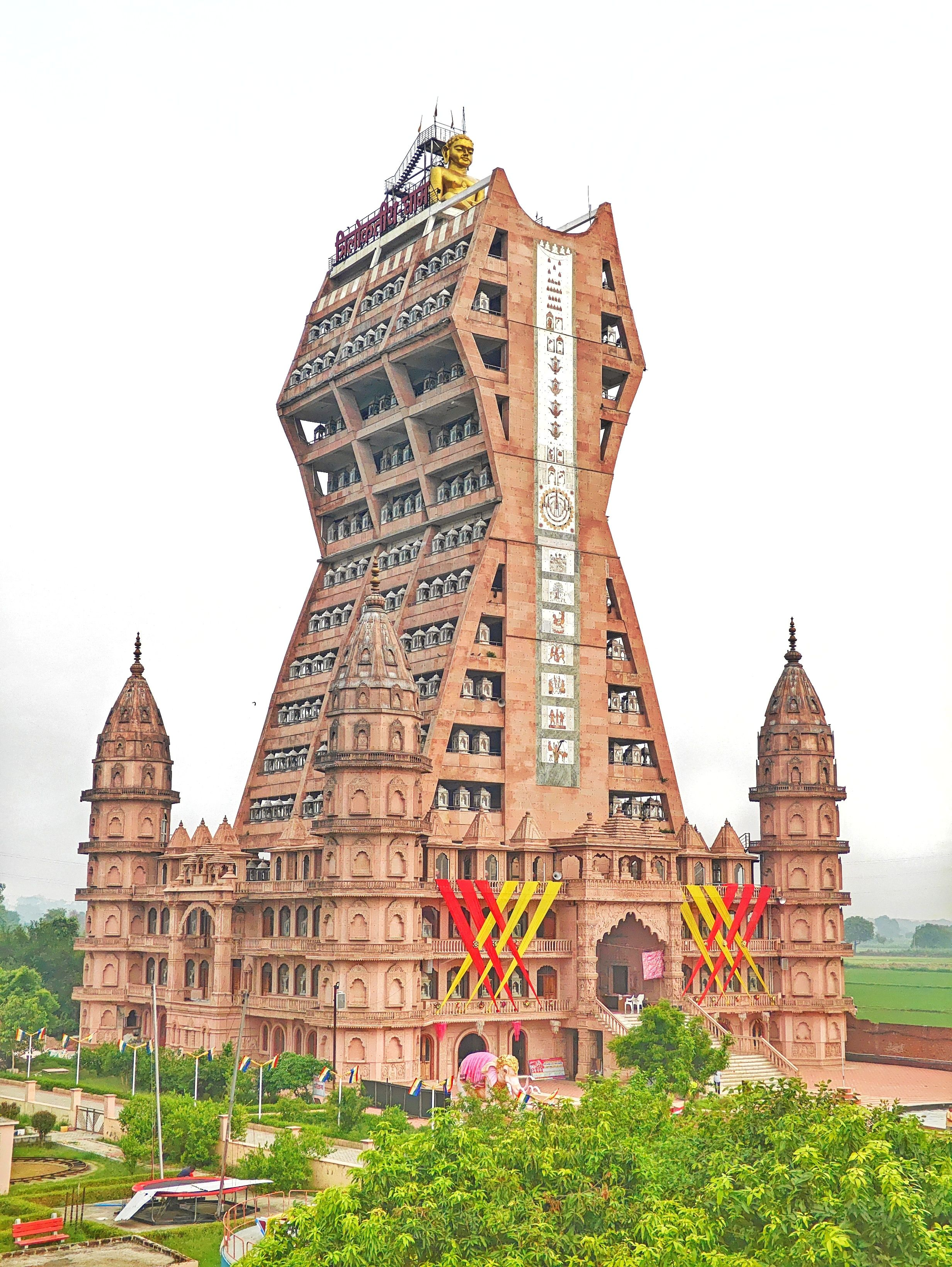
'Trilok Teerth Dham' modelled after the three lokas

Jain doctrine postulates an eternal and ever-existing world which works on universal natural laws. The existence of a creator deity is overwhelmingly opposed in Jain doctrine.

Some men declare that a creator made the world. The doctrine that the world was created is ill advised and should be rejected. If God created the world, where was he before the creation? If you say he was transcendent then and needed no support, where is he now? How could God have made this world without any raw material? If you say that he made this first, and then the world, you are faced with an endless regression.

— Ācārya Jinasena, Mahāpurāṇa

According to Jains, the universe has a firm and an unalterable shape, which is measured in the Jain texts by means of a unit called Rajlok, which is supposed to be very large. This unit of measurement is the distance covered by a god flying at ten million miles per second for six months. (Approximately 57 light years.) Jainism postulates that the universe is fourteen Rajloks high and extends seven Rajloks from north to south. Its breadth is seven Rajloks long at the bottom and decreases gradually towards the middle, where it is one Rajlok long. The width then increases gradually until it is five Rajloks long and again decreases until it is one Rajlok long. The apex of the universe is one Rajlok long, one Rajlok wide and eight Rajloks high. The total space of the world is thus 343 cubic Rajloks. The Svetambara view differs slightly and postulates that there is a constant increase and decrease in the breadth, and the space is 239 cubic Rajlok. Apart from the apex, which is the abode of liberated beings, the universe is divided into three parts. The world is surrounded by three atmospheres: dense-water, dense-wind and thin-wind. It is then surrounded by an infinitely large non-world which is completely empty.

The whole world is said to be filled with living beings. In all three parts, there is the existence of very small living beings called nigoda. Nigoda are of two types: nitya-nigoda and Itara-nigoda. Nitya-nigoda are those which will reincarnate as nigoda throughout eternity, where as Itara-nigoda will be reborn as other beings. The mobile region of universe (Trasnaadi) is one Rajlok wide, one Rajlok broad and fourteen Rajloks high. Within this region, there are animals and plants everywhere, where as human beings are restricted to 2 continents of the middle world. The beings inhabiting the lower world are called Narak (Hellish beings). The Deva (roughly demi-gods) live in the whole of the top and middle worlds, and top three realms of the lower world. Living beings are divided in fourteen classes (Jivasthana) : Fine beings with one sense, crude beings with one sense, beings with two senses, beings with three senses, beings with four senses, beings with five senses and no mind, and beings with five senses and a mind. These can be under-developed or developed, a total of 14. Human beings can get any form of existence, but can only attain salvation in a human form.

=== Three lokas ===
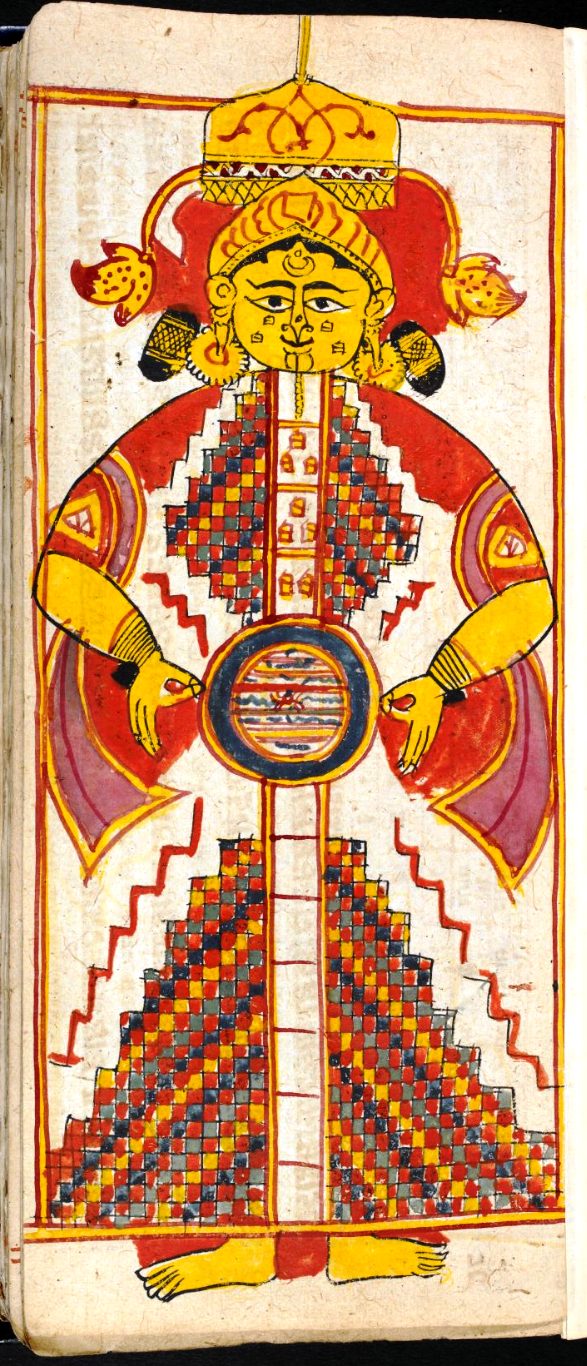
Fourteen Rajlok or Triloka. Shape of Universe as per Jain cosmology in form of a cosmic man. Miniature from 17th century, Saṁgrahaṇīratna by Śrīcandra, in Prakrit with a Gujarati commentary. Jain Śvetāmbara cosmological text with commentary and illustrations.

The early Jains contemplated the nature of the earth and universe. They developed a detailed hypothesis on the various aspects of astronomy and cosmology. According to the Jain texts, the universe is divided into 3 parts:

- Urdhva Loka – the realms of the gods or heavens
- Madhya Loka – the realms of the humans, animals and plants
- Adho Loka – the realms of the hellish beings or the infernal regions

The following Upanga āgamas describe the Jain cosmology and geography in a great detail:

1. Sūryaprajñapti – Treatise on Sun
2. Jambūdvīpaprajñapti – Treatise on the island of Roseapple tree; it contains a description of Jambūdvīpa and life biographies of Ṛṣabha and King Bharata
3. Candraprajñapti – Treatise on moon

Additionally, the following texts describe the Jain cosmology and related topics in detail:

1. Trilokasāra – Essence of the three worlds (heavens, middle level, hells)
2. Trilokaprajñapti – Treatise on the three worlds
3. Trilokadipikā – Illumination of the three worlds
4. Tattvārthasūtra – Description on nature of realities
5. Kṣetrasamasa – Summary of Jain geography
6. Bruhatsamgrahni – Treatise on Jain cosmology and geography

=== Urdhva Loka, the upper world ===
The Upper World (Urdhva Loka) is divided into different abodes and are the realms of the heavenly beings (Gods) who are non-liberated souls.

The Upper World is divided into sixteen Kalpas, nine Graiveyaka, nine Anudisha, and five Anuttara abodes:

The sixteen Kalpa abodes are: Saudharma, Aishana, Sanatkumara, Mahendra, Brahma, Brahmottara, Lantava, Kapishta, Shukra, Mahashukra, Shatara, Sahasrara, Anata, Pranata, Arana, and Achyuta.

The nine Graiveyaka abodes are Sudarshana, Amogha, Suprabuddha, Yashodhara, Subhadra, Suvishala, Sumanasa, Saumanasa. and Pritikara.

The nine Anudisha abodes are Aditya, Archi, Archimalini, Vaira, Vairochana, Sauma, Saumarupa, Arka, and Sphatika.

The five Anuttara abodes are Vijaya, Vaijayanta, Jayanta, Aparajita, and Sarvarthasiddhi.

The sixteen heavens in Devalokas are also called Kalpas and the rest are called Kalpatitas. Those living in Kalpatitas are called Ahamindra and are equal in grandeur. There is increase with regard to the lifetime, influence of power, happiness, lumination of body, purity in thought-colouration, capacity of the senses and range of clairvoyance in the heavenly beings residing in the higher abodes. But there is decrease with regard to motion, stature, attachment and pride. The higher groups, dwelling in nine Graiveyaka and five Anuttara abodes are independent and dwell in their own vehicles. The Anuttara souls attain liberation within one or two lifetimes. The lower groups, organized like earthly kingdoms—rulers (Indra), counselors, guards, queens, followers, armies etc.

Above the Anuttara abodes, at the apex of the universe is the realm of the liberated souls, the perfected omniscient and blissful beings, who are venerated by the Jains.

=== Madhya Loka, the middle world ===
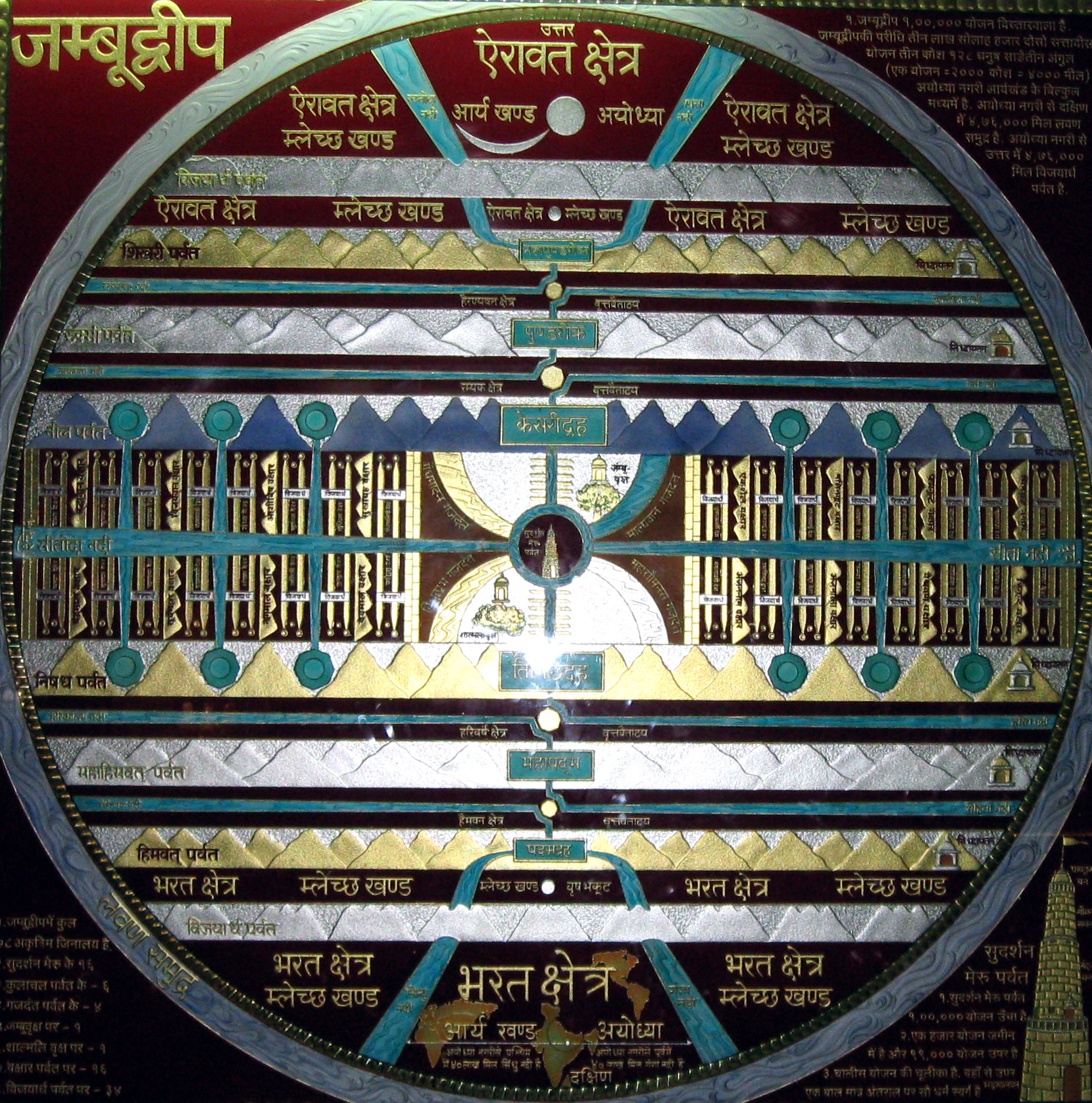
Image depicting map of Jambudvipa as per Jain Cosmology

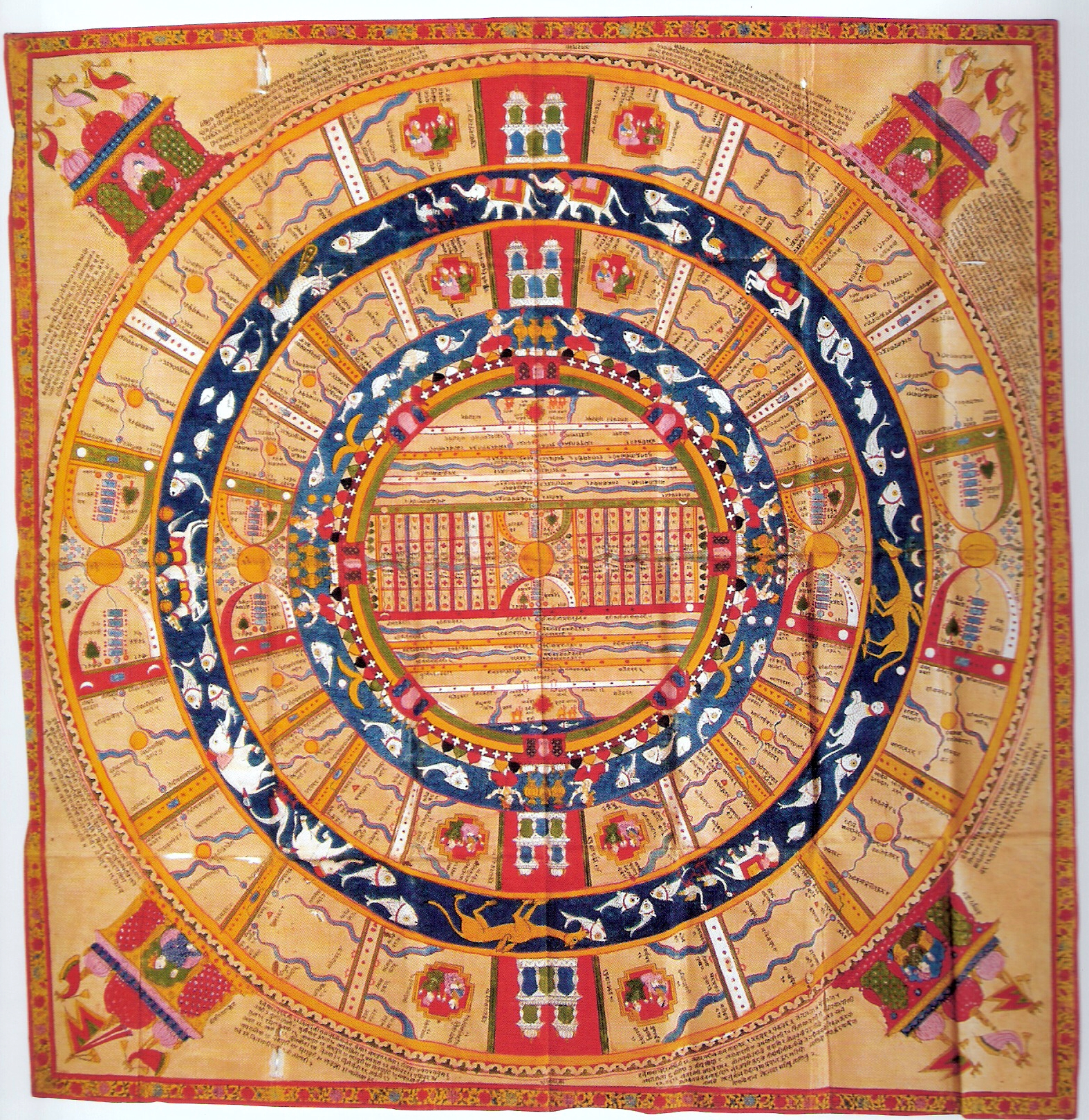
Early 19th-century painting depicting map of 2 1/2 continents

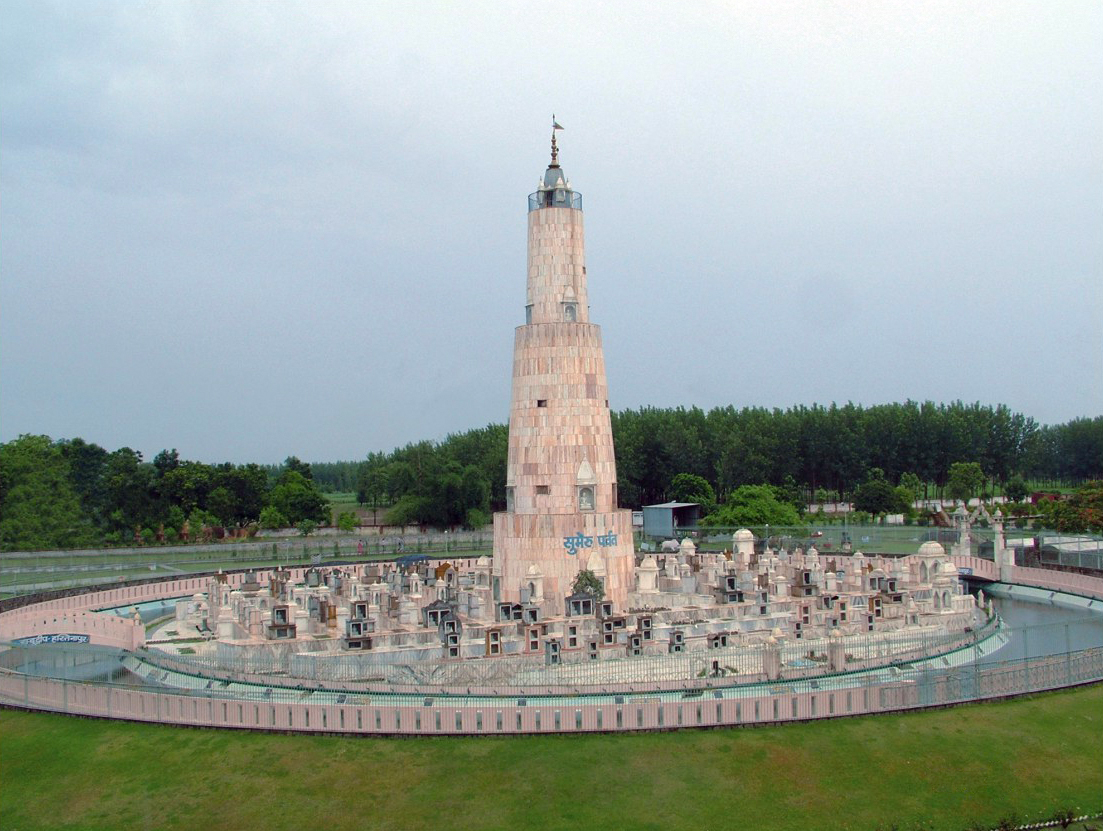
Depiction of Mount Meru at Jambudweep, Hastinapur

Madhya Loka consists of 900 yojanas above and 900 yojanas below earth surface. It is inhabited by:

1. Jyotishka devas (luminous gods) – 790 to 900 yojanas above earth
2. Humans, Triyancha (Animals, birds, plants) on the surface
3. Vyantaradevas (Intermediary gods) – 100 yojanas below the ground level

Madhyaloka consists of many continent-islands surrounded by oceans, first eight whose names are:

Continent/ Island	Ocean
Jambūdvīpa	Lavanoda (Salt – ocean)
Ghatki Khand	Kaloda (Black sea)
Puskarvardvīpa	Puskaroda (Lotus Ocean)
Varunvardvīpa	Varunoda (Varun Ocean)
Kshirvardvīpa	Kshiroda (Ocean of milk)
Ghrutvardvīpa	Ghrutoda (Butter milk ocean)
Ikshuvardvīpa	Iksuvaroda (Sugar Ocean)
Nandishwardvīpa	Nandishwaroda

Mount Meru (also Sumeru) is at the centre of the world surrounded by Jambūdvīpa, in form of a circle forming a diameter of 100,000 yojanas. There are two sets of sun, moon and stars revolving around Mount Meru; while one set works, the other set rests behind the Mount Meru.

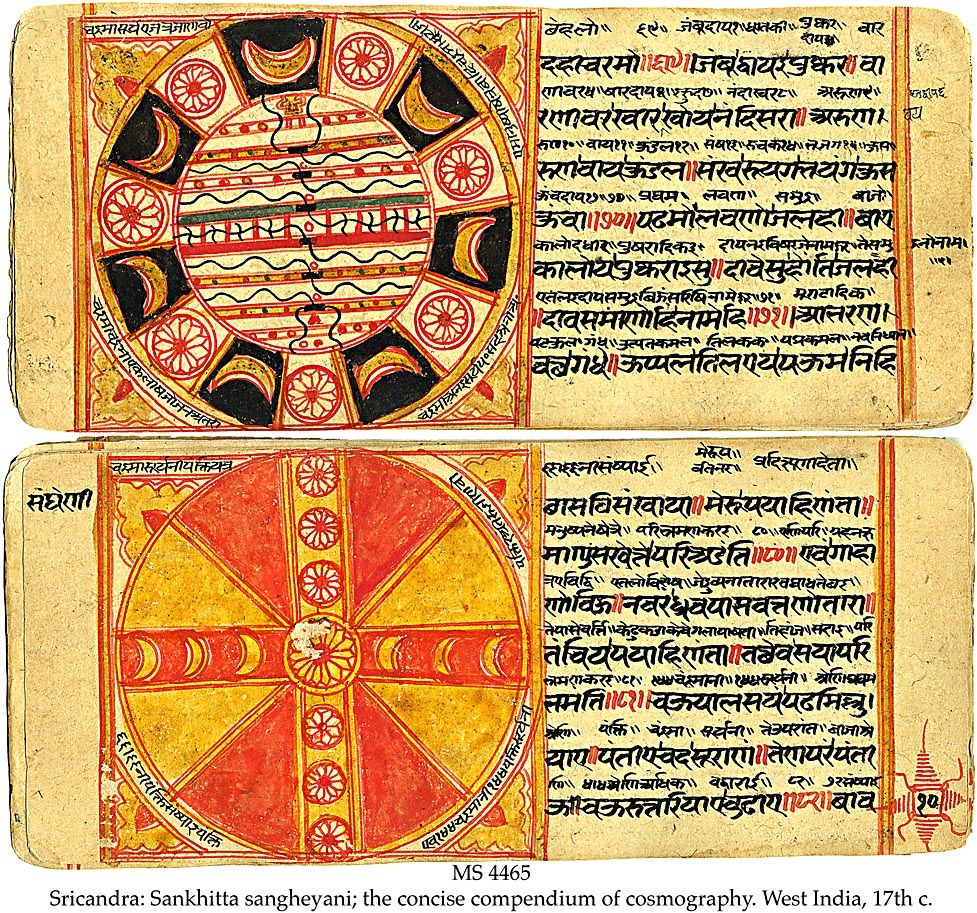
Work of Art showing maps and diagrams as per Jain Cosmography from 17th century CE Manuscript of 12th century Jain text Sankhitta Sangheyan

The Jambūdvīpa continent has 6 mighty mountains, dividing the continent into 7 zones (kshetras). The names of these zones are:

1. Bharata Kshetra
2. Mahavideha Kshetra
3. Airavata Kshetra
4. Ramyaka Kshetra
5. Hairanyavata Kshetra
6. Haimavata Kshetra

The three zones of Bharata Kshetra, Mahavideha Kshetra, and Airavata Kshetra are also known as karmabhumi because practice of austerities and liberation is possible and the Tirthankaras preach the Jain doctrine. The other three zones, Ramyaka Kshetra, Hairanyavata Kshetra, and Haimavata Kshetra are known as akarmabhumi or bhogabhumi as humans live a sinless life of pleasure and no religion or liberation is possible.

Nandishvara Dvipa is not the edge of cosmos, but it is beyond the reach of humans. Humans can reside only on Jambudvipa, Dhatatikhanda Dvipa, and the inner half of Pushkara Dvipa.

=== Adho Loka, the lower world ===
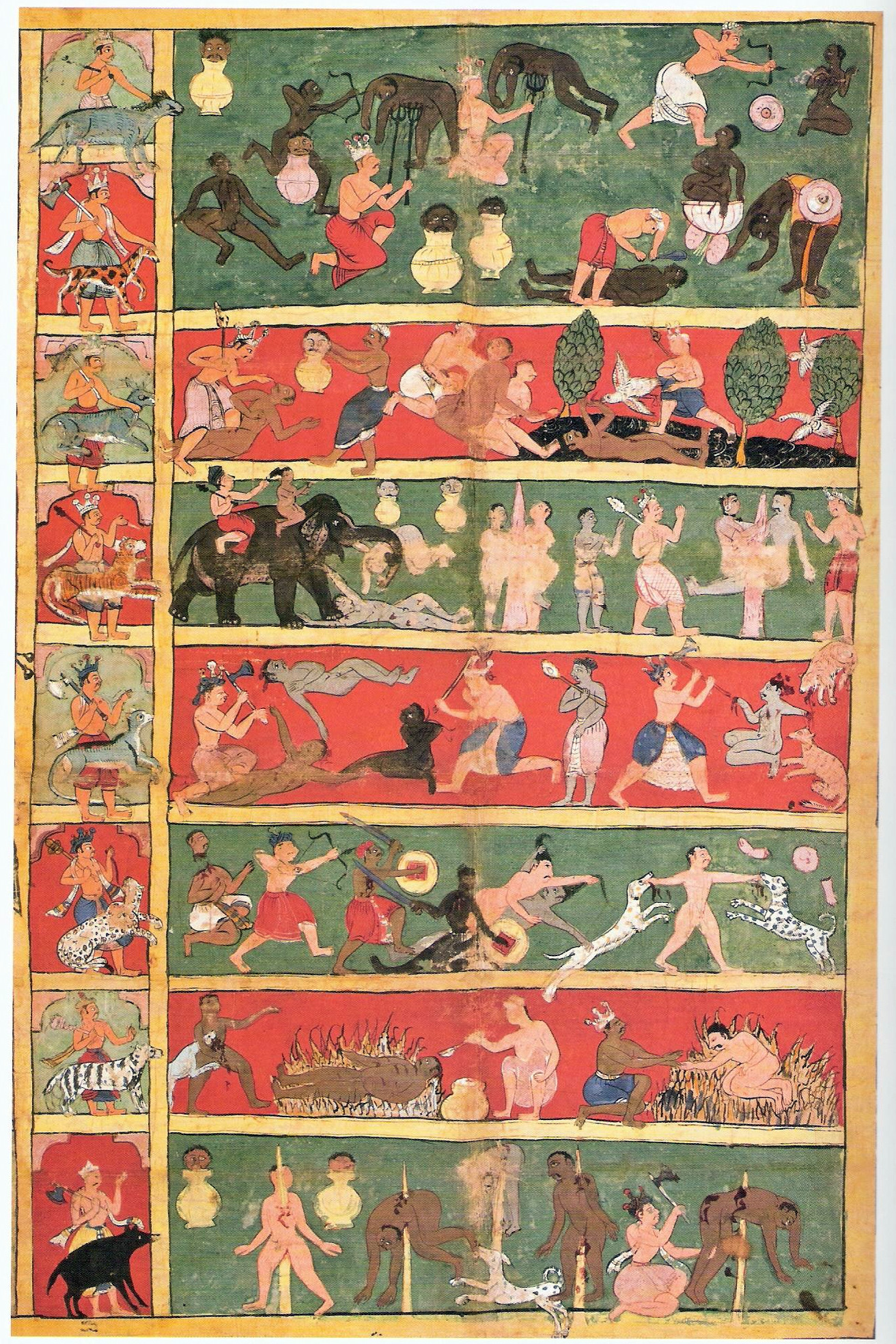
17th century cloth painting depicting seven levels of Jain hell and various tortures suffered in them. Left panel depicts the demi-god and his animal vehicle presiding over the each hell.

The lower world consists of seven hells, which are inhabited by Bhavanpati demigods and the hellish beings. Hellish beings reside in the following hells:

1. Ratna prabha-dharma.
2. Sharkara prabha-vansha.
3. Valuka prabha-megha.
4. Pank prabha-anjana.
5. Dhum prabha-arista.
6. Tamah prabha-maghavi.
7. Mahatamah prabha-maadhavi

== Time cycle ==
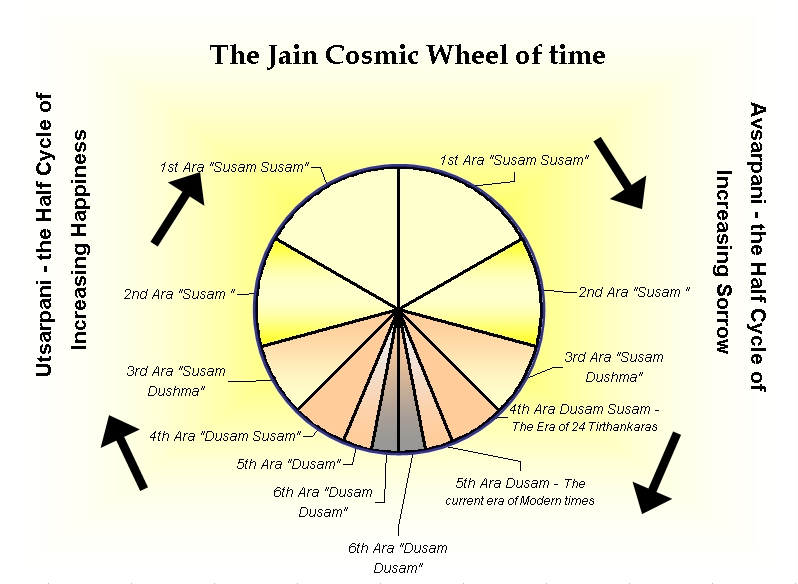
Division of time as envisaged by Jains

According to Jainism, time is beginningless and eternal. The Kālacakra, the cosmic wheel of time, rotates ceaselessly. The wheel of time is divided into two half-rotations, Utsarpiṇī or ascending time cycle and Avasarpiṇī, the descending time cycle, occurring continuously after each other. Utsarpiṇī is a period of progressive prosperity and happiness where the time spans and ages are at an increasing scale, while Avsarpiṇī is a period of increasing sorrow and immorality with decline in timespans of the epochs. Each half of this time cycle lasts for innumerable lengths of time (measured in sagaropama and palyopama years) (Note: Per Jain cosmology: Sirsapahelika, or 10^194, is the highest measurable number in Jainism. Higher than that is palyopama (pit-measured years), explained by an analogy of a pit: a hollow pit of 8 x 8 x 8 miles tightly filled with hair particles of a seven-day-old newborn. [A single hair from the above cut into eight pieces seven times = 2,097,152 Particles]. 1 Particle emptied after every 100 years, the time taken to empty the whole pit = 1 palyopama. (1 palyopama = countless years.) Hence palyopama is at least 10^194 years. Sagrapoma is 10 quadrillion palyopama, that means a Sagrapoma is more than 10^210 years.) is further sub-divided into six aras or epochs of unequal periods. Currently, the time cycle is in avasarpiṇī or descending phase with the following epochs.

Name of the Ara	Degree of happiness	Duration of Ara	Maximum height of people	Maximum lifespan of people
Suṣama-suṣamā	Utmost happiness and no sorrow	400 trillion sāgaropamas	6 miles (~ 9656 meters)	3 palyopam years
Suṣamā	Moderate happiness and no sorrow	300 trillion sāgaropamas	4 miles (~ 6437 meters)	2 palyopam years
Suṣama-duḥṣamā	Happiness with very little sorrow	200 trillion sāgaropamas	2 miles (~ 3218 meters)	1 palyopam years
Duḥṣama-suṣamā	Happiness with little sorrow	100 trillion sāgaropamas	1,500 meters	84 lakh purva (Note: A purva is equal to 70.56 trillion years.) (592.704 quintillion years)
Duḥṣamā	Sorrow with very little happiness	21,000 years	7 hatha (10.5 feet)	120 years
Duḥṣama- duḥṣamā	Extreme sorrow and misery	21,000 years	1 hatha (1.5 feet)	20 years

In utsarpiṇī, the order of the eras is reversed. Starting from duṣamā-duṣamā, it ends with suṣamā-suṣamā, thus this never-ending cycle continues. Each ara progresses into the next phase seamlessly without any apocalyptic consequences. The happiness, lifespan, and height of people, and the general moral conduct of society, change in a phased and graded manner as the time passes. No divine or supernatural beings are credited with (or responsible for) these spontaneous temporal changes, either in a creative or overseeing role. Rather, human beings and creatures are born under the impulse of their own karma.

== Śalākāpuruṣas – The deeds of the 63 illustrious men ==
According to Jain texts, sixty-three illustrious beings, called śalākāpuruṣas, are born on this earth in every Dukhama-sukhamā ara. The Jain universal history is a compilation of the deeds of these illustrious persons. They comprise twenty-four Tīrthaṅkaras, twelve chakravartins, nine balabhadra, nine narayana, and nine pratinarayana. (Note: Balabhadra is also referred to as Baladeva, Narayana as Vasudeva or Vishnu, and Pratinarayana as Prativasudeva in Jain texts.)

A chakravartī is an emperor of the world and lord of the material realm. Though he possesses worldly power, he often finds his ambitions dwarfed by the vastness of the cosmos. Jain puranas give a list of twelve chakravartins (universal monarchs). They are golden in complexion. One of the chakravartins mentioned in Jain scriptures is Bharata Chakravartin. Jain texts like Harivamsa Purana and Hindu Texts like Vishnu Purana state that Indian subcontinent came to be known as Bharata varsha in his memory.

There are nine sets of balabhadra, narayana, and pratinarayana. The balabhadra and narayana are brothers. Balabhadra are nonviolent heroes, narayana are violent heroes, and pratinarayana the villains. According to the legends, the narayana ultimately kill the pratinarayana. Of the nine balabhadra, eight attain liberation and the last goes to heaven. On death, the narayana go to hell because of their violent exploits, even if these were intended to uphold righteousness.

Jain cosmology divides the worldly cycle of time into two parts (avasarpiṇī and utsarpiṇī). According to Jain belief, in every half-cycle of time, twenty-four tīrthaṅkaras are born in the human realm to discover and teach the Jain doctrine appropriate for that era. The word tīrthankara signifies the founder of a tirtha, which means a fordable passage across a sea. The tīrthaṅkaras show the 'fordable path' across the sea of interminable births and deaths. Rishabhanatha is said to be the first tīrthankara of the present half-cycle (avasarpiṇī). Mahāvīra (6th century BC) is revered as the twenty fourth tīrthankara of avasarpiṇī. Jain texts state that Jainism has always existed and will always exist.

During each motion of the half-cycle of the wheel of time, 63 Śalākāpuruṣa or 63 illustrious men, consisting of the 24 Tīrthaṅkaras and their contemporaries regularly appear. The Jain universal or legendary history is basically a compilation of the deeds of these illustrious men. They are categorised as follows:

- 24 Tīrthaṅkaras – The 24 Tīrthaṅkaras or the supreme ford makers appear in succession to activate the true religion and establish the community of ascetics and laymen.
- 12 Chakravartins – The Chakravartīs are the universal monarchs who rule over the six continents.
- 9 Balabhadras who lead an ideal Jain life.e.g. Lord Rama
- 9 Narayana or Vasudev (heroes)
- 9 Prati-Naryana or Prati-Vasudev (anti-heroes) – They are anti-heroes who are ultimately killed by the Narayana.

Balabhadra and Narayana are half brothers who jointly rule over three continents.

Besides these, a few other important classes of 106 persons are recognized:

- 9 Naradas
- 11 Rudras
- 24 Kamdevas
- 24 Fathers of the Tirthankaras.
- 24 Mothers of the Tirthankaras.
- 14 Kulakara (patriarchs)

== See also ==
- God in Jainism
- Jainism and non-creationism
- History of Jainism
- Macranthropy
- Saṃsāra (Jainism)
