= Kulakara =

Jain legendary teachers

In Jainism, kulakara (also manu) refers to the wise men who teach people how to perform the laborious activities for survival. According to Jain Cosmology, when the third ara (epoch) of the avasarpani (present descending half-cycle of cosmic age) was nearing its end, felicities due to ten type of Kalpavriksha (wish-fulfilling trees) started declining. The number of the sages who thus appeared is said to be fourteen, the last of whom was Nabhirai, the father of the first tirthankara, Rishabhanatha.

== Role ==
Jainism acknowledge a set of first law-givers who flourished in the present Avasarpini age (in the third division called susama-duhsama, when beings were born as twins and when the Kalpavriksha (wishing trees) used to provide them with necessary food, light and other necessities of life). The age of Kulakara was a primitive one, when arts and sciences were not known, and crime and punishment were in infancy.

== Fourteen Kulakaras ==
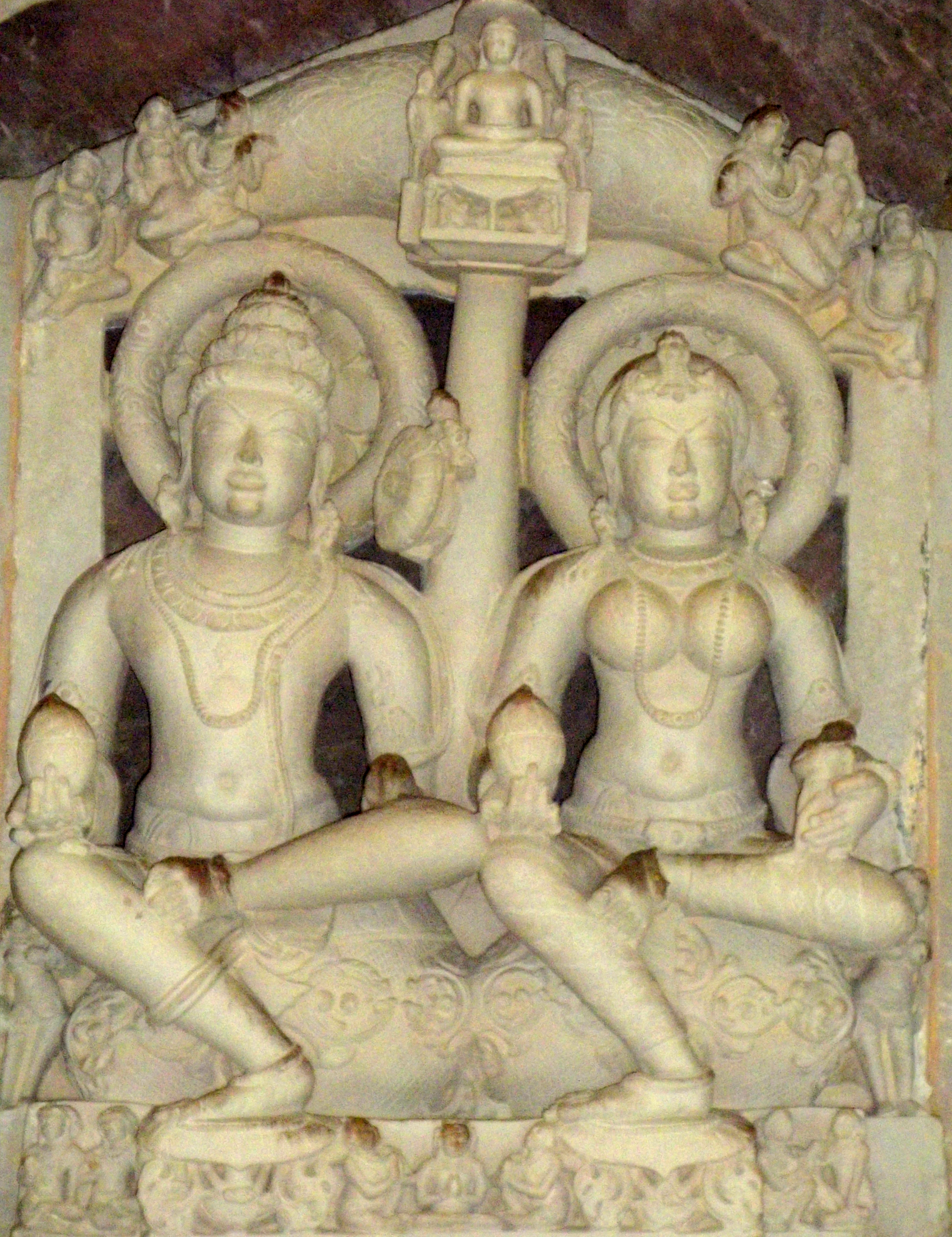
Image depicting the last kulakara, Nabhirai and his wife Marudevi

=== Pratisruti ===
The first kulakara was Pratisruti whose height was 1,800 Dhanush and who lived for a tenth of a Palya. His twin (and female partner) was Swayamprabha. When the trees that shed strong light around them, in the state of the bhogabhumi disappeared and the sun and the moon became visible, the people, who saw them for the first time, were alarmed. It was Pratisruti who understood the cause of their appearance by his superior wisdom. He explained to them that the light of the trees had been too powerful thus far to enable the sun and the moon to be seen but now that that illumination had paled they became visible. The division of day and night dates from his time.

He organized a punishment for those who attempted to steal, cause harm or commit any wrongdoing. This punishment involved muttering the phrase “Ha” sternly.

=== Sanmati ===
Pratishruti’s son Sanmati was the second Kulkar whose height was 1,300 Dhanush and who lived for one hundredth of a Palya. His female partner was Yashasvati. In his time the light of the trees had faded into insignificance, and even the stars became visible in the sky.

=== Kshemankara ===
Then came Kshemankara, after the lapse of a long long time. In his time animals began to be troublesome. Hitherto the feeding-trees had supplied men and animals with enough food; but now the conditions were changing, and every one had to look for himself. The distinction of domestic and wild animals dates from Kshemankara's time.

=== Kshemandhara ===
Kshemandhara was the fourth manu who followed Kshemankara after a long interval of time. He is said to have devised weapons of wood and stone to drive away wild animals.

=== Seemankara ===
The next manu was Seemankara. In his time, quarrels arose over the kalpa trees (wish-fulfilling trees). He was called Seemankara, because he had fixed the seemas (boundaries) of proprietorship.

=== Seemandhara ===
Seemandhara was the next in order to appear. The quarrels had become more intense by his time over the disappearing kal'pa vrikshas (trees). He laid the foundation of individual ownership over the trees, and he also set marks on them.

=== Vimalabahana ===
Vimalabahana was the seventh manu. He taught men how to utilise the services of domestic animals, and invented the tethering rope, the bridle and the like to keep them under control.

=== Chakshusmana ===
Chakshusmana then appeared after the lapse of another long period of time. In his time the old order of bhogabhumi was so far changed that the parents did not die at the birth of their progeny. Some people were astonished at this and enquired the cause of the change from Chakshusmana, which he explained.

=== Yasasvana ===
Yasasvana, the ninth kulakara. According to Jain texts, he taught the men how to regard their children as their own, and to bless them.

=== Abhi Chandra ===
The tenth manu was Abhi Chandra, in whose time the old order of things underwent still further changes. The people now lived to play with their children; they also began to give them useful instruction. Because Abhi Chandra was the first to play with his children in moonlight he came to be known as Abhi Chandra (chandra signifying the moon).

=== Chandrabha ===
The eleventh manu was Chandrabha, in whose time children came to be looked after better. His guidance was also very beneficial for mankind in certain other ways.

=== Marud deva ===
The twelfth manu was Marud Deva. He is said to have taught the art of navigation.

=== Prasenajit ===
Prasenajit was the thirteen kulakara. According to Jain texts, in his time children came to be born with prasena (the amnion or membrane in which a child is born). Before his time children were not wrapped in a membrane.

=== Nabhi rai ===
The last of the kulakaras was Nabhi Rai. He was the father of Rishabhanatha. Kulkara Nabhi taught the men how to cut the navel chord (nabhi). According to Jain texts, thick rain cloud began to gather in the sky freely in his time.
