= Harivamsa Gosvami =

Harivamsa, a disciple of Gopala Bhatta Goswami, espoused a Vaishnava Theology which created the Radhavallabha Vaishnava sect of Hinduism. Also, Harivamsa Goswami is known for his emotional poetry about Radha and Krishna.

== Early life ==
He was born around 1500 in the village of Bad, in Vrindavan, near Mathura, on the Mathura-Agra Road, in Braja Mandala. His father was an astrologer at the courts of the Mughal Emperor.

He was married at the age of 16 and had three sons. He renounced family life at the age of 32 and started for Vrindavana in modern-day Uttar Pradesh.

He is the founder of Radha Vallabha temple in Vrindavana. The original temple of Radha Vallabha was destroyed by the army of Aurangazeb in 1670 and a new temple was built next to the old one.
