= Harivamsha Purana =

Harivamsha Purana or Harivaṃśa Purāṇa may refer to:

- Harivaṃśa, an epic poem in Sanskrit about the Hindu god Krishna, a supplement to the Mahabharata
- Harivaṃśapurāṇa, an 8th-century Jain text by Jinasena

== See also ==
- Harivanshism, another name of Krishnaism, a Hindu sect which treats Krishna as the supreme being
- Harivamsa Gosvami, a 16th-century Indian Vaishnava Hindu saint
