= Sudarsana =

Legendary ruler in Thai chronicles

Ruler of Indaprasthanagara

Sudarsana (Thai: สุทัศน์) is a legendary ruler of Indaprasthanagara mentioned in Thai chronicles. The Northern Chronicle describes him as a ruler of Indaprasthanagara. It also tells of a golden palace built for him, which turned to stone after his death.

== Chronicle accounts ==
The Northern Chronicle states that Sudarsana was born into a wealthy family in Aroccakāma (อโรชคาม). It describes him as having 500 wealthy followers. According to the chronicle, Indra ordered Vishvakarman to build a golden palace for him. The palace had seven storeys, and Sudarsana was later crowned ruler of Indaprasthanagara.

The chronicle states that Sudarsana died at the age of 150. After his death, the golden buildings turned to stone. His grandson, Phraya Kotama Thewarat (พระยาโคตมเทวราช), subsequently became ruler of the city.

According to the Legend of Mueang Phaya Re (Thai: ตำนานเมืองพญาเร่), Indaprasthanagara was established and later abandoned. The city was rebuilt by Sudarsana around Buddhist Era 1300 (757 CE). This legend places the city in eastern Thailand.

According to the Northern Chronicle, Phraya Kotama Thewarat left Indaprasthanagara after the arrival of Phraya Kreak and travelled eastward to establish a new settlement.
