= Bharata (Jainism) =

Universal Monarch

- 1st Chakravarti (universal monarch)
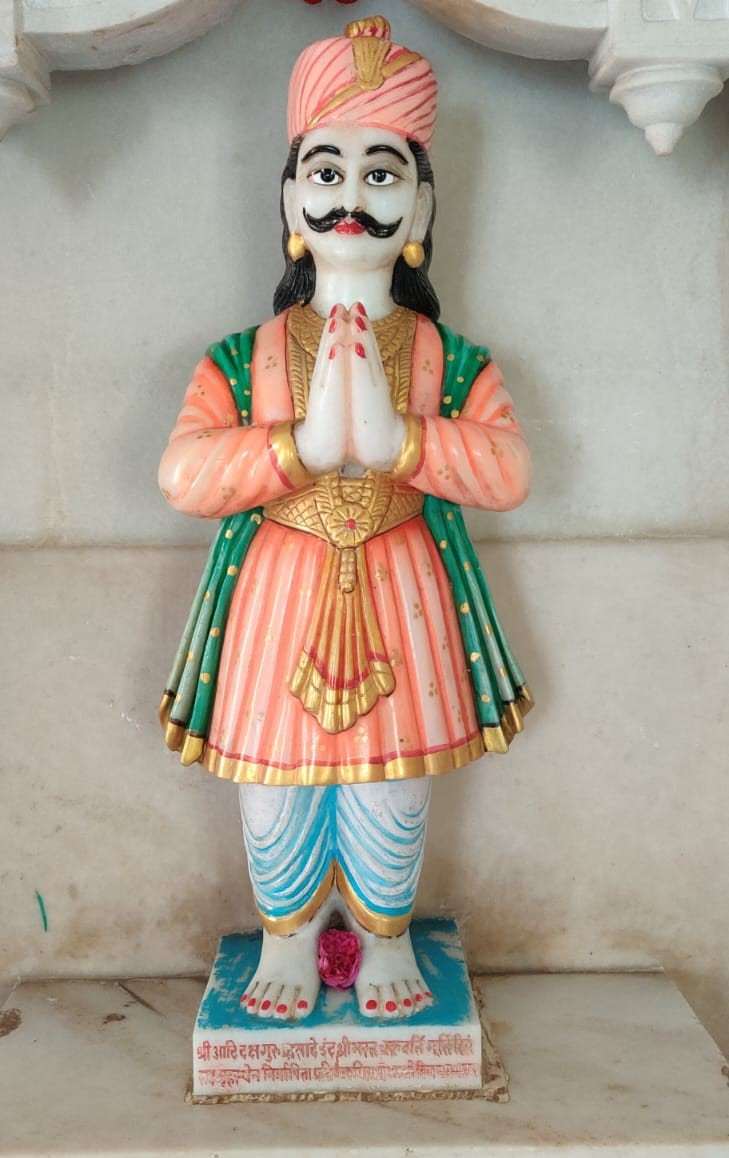
- King Bharat Chakravartin at Shree Samavasarna Śvetāmbara Maha Mandir, Aagashi, Palghar, Maharashtra, India
- Successor: Sagara
- Color: Skin

Genealogy
- Born: Ayodhya
- Died: Ashtapada
- Parents: Rishabha (father); Sumangalā (mother)
- Siblings: Nami and 97 other (brothers); Brāhmī (sister) • Bahubali (half-brother) and Sundarī (half-sister)
- Spouse: Subhadrā
- Children: Prince Arkakīrti; Marichi

In Jainism, Bharata was the first chakravartin (lit. 'holder of a chakra', i.e., emperor) of the Avasarpini (present half-time cycle). He was the eldest son of Rishabhanatha, the first tirthankara. The ancient name of India was named Bhāratavarsha or Bhārat or Bharata-bhumi after him. He had two sons from his chief-empress Subhadra, named Arkakirti and Marichi. He is said to have conquered all six parts of the world and to have engaged in a fight with Bahubali, his brother, to conquer the last remaining city of the world.

According to the Digambara sub-tradition of Jainism, in his later years, he renounced the world, led an ascetic life, and attained kevala jnana (omniscience). According to the Śvetāmbara Jains, he attained kevala jnana (omniscience) after which he renounced the world. He gained kevala jnana when he came to believe that the human body lacked beauty and renounced the world as a kevalajnani (omniscient), and then attained moksha.

== Life in traditional accounts ==
=== Early life and family ===
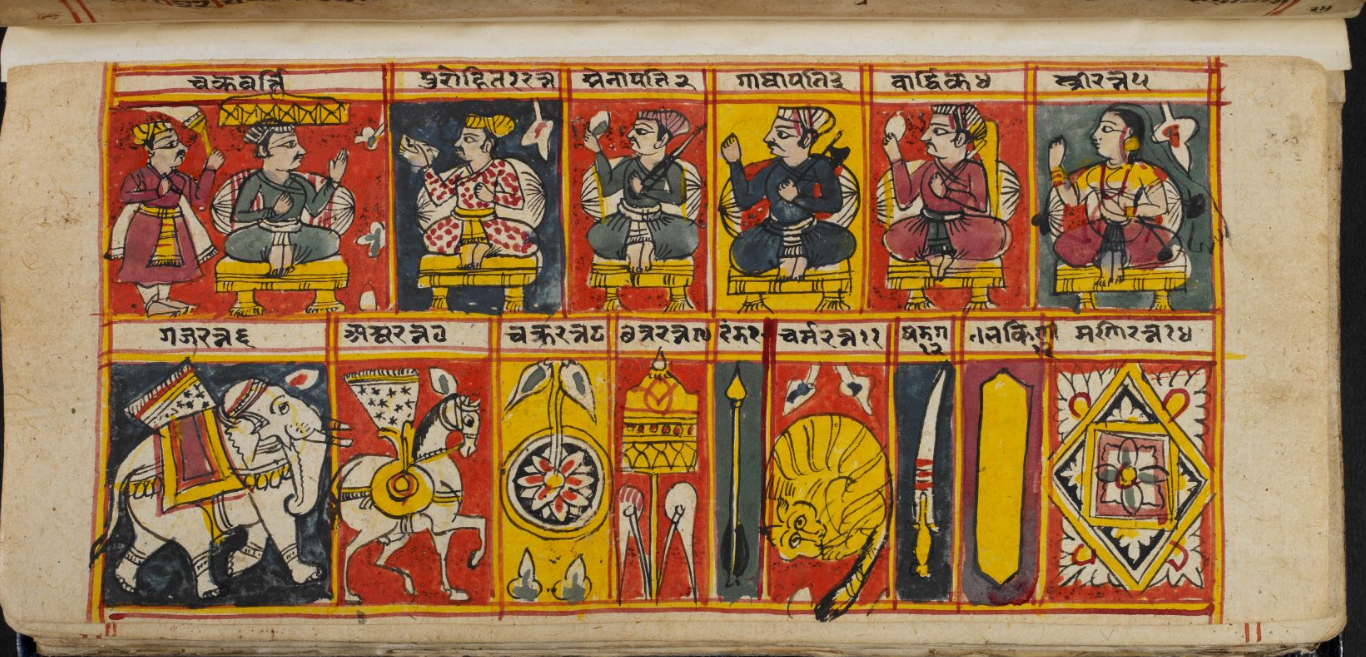
14 Ratna (jewels) of Chankravartin. Miniature from the 17th century, Saṁgrahaṇīratna by Śrīcandra, in Prakrit with a Gujarati commentary. Jain Śvetāmbara cosmological text with commentary and illustrations.

In a Jain legend, Yasasvati Devi, senior-most queen of Rishabhanatha (first Jain tirthankara), saw four auspicious dreams one night. She saw the sun and the moon, the Mount Meru, the lake with swans, earth and the ocean. Rishabhanatha explained her that these dreams meant that a chakravartin ruler will be born to them who will conquer whole of the world. Then, Bharata was born to them on the ninth day of the dark half of the month of Chaitra. He was a Kshatriya born in Ikshvaku dynasty. His education included special emphasis on law and the science of polity of kings. He also had interest in dancing and art. Bharata married many princesses during his world conquest and Subhadra was his chief queen. He was succeeded by his son Arka Kirti (founder of Suryavansha). Bharata also had another son named Marichi, who was one of the previous incarnation of Mahavira, the twenty-fourth tirthankara.

=== Conquest and administration ===
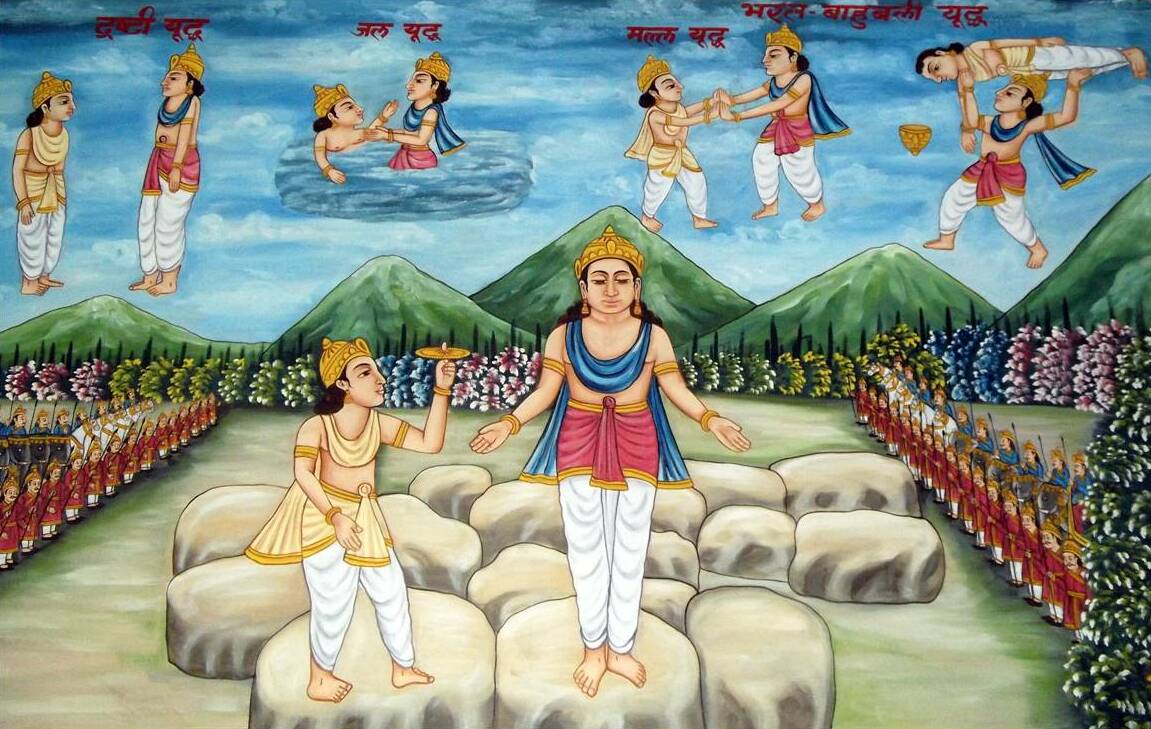
Depiction of Bharata-Bahubali fight

Bharata is believed to be the first chakravartin (chakra possessing emperor) of the present half cycle of Jain cosmology. According to Jain legends, Rishabhanatha distributed his kingdom to his hundred sons while becoming a muni (Jain monk). Bharata is said to have got the city of Vinita (Ayodhya) whereas Bahubali is claimed to have got the city of Podanapur (Bodhan). Legends further state that Bharata's coronation was followed by a long journey of world conquest. During his digvijaya (winning six divisions of earth in all directions), he is believed to have acquired the nine nidhis (most precious treasures) and fourteen ratna (jewels). After completing his world-conquest, he is said to have proceeded for his capital Ayodhyapuri with a huge army and the divine chakra-ratna (spinning, disk-like super weapon with serrated edges).

The chakra-ratna supposedly stopped on its own at the entrance of the capital signalling that there still remain his 99 brothers who have refused submission to his supreme authority. 98 of them are claimed to have become monks giving him their kingdoms. Bahubali refused to submit and challenged him for a fight. Three kinds of contests are depicted to have been held between Bharata and Bahubali. These were eye-fight (staring at each other), jala-yuddha (water-wrestling) and malla-yuddha (wrestling). Bahubali is said to have won all the three contests. In the last fight, Bahubali lifted Bharata up on his shoulder instead of throwing him down on the ground. He is said to have gently placed him on the ground instead, out of an affectionate regard for him. Humiliated and infuriated, Bharata is believed to have called for his chakra-ratna. Instead of harming Bahubali, the weapon is believed to have circled around him before coming to a rest. This is believed to have happened because Jain tradition states that such divine weapons lose their effectiveness when confronted with their master's close relations. After this Bahubali, developed a desire for renunciation and gave up his kingdom to become a monk.

Bharata is claimed to be the first law-giver of the current half-cycle in Jain tradition. He is said to have added the fourth varna, brahmins, to the three-fold varna-system created by Rishabhanatha which consisted of ksatriyas, vaishyas and shudras. Their role, as mentioned in tradition, was to meditate, learn, teach and search for knowledge.

=== Renunciation ===
According to Digambara texts, when Bharata discovered that he is becoming old due to a white hair in his head, he immediately decided to become a Jain monk. Because of the effect of his growing renunciation over the years, he destroyed his inimical karmas within an antaramuhūrta (less than forty-eight minutes) and attained Kevala Jnana (omniscience). Śvetāmbara traditional accounts reject the claim of his renunciation and maintain that he gained omniscience after the death of his father.

== Legacy and adoration ==
According to Jain and even many Hindu scriptures like Adipurana and Triṣaṣṭiśalākāpuruṣacaritra, Rishabhanatha was the son of Nabhiraja, and Rishabha had a son named Bharata, and after his name, the land conquered was known as Bharat. India was named "Bhāratavarsha" or "Bhārata" or "Bharata-bhumi" after him. In the Hindu text, Skanda Purana (chapter 37) it is stated that "Rishabhanatha was the son of Nabhiraja, and Rishabha had a son named Bharata, and after the name of this Bharata, this country is known as Bharata-varsha." Bharata is also mentioned in Bhagavata Purana.

=== Temples ===
Some Jain temples contain images of Bharata as a Jain monk, including one at Shravanabelagola. The Koodalmanikyam Temple in Kerala was originally a Jain temple dedicated to Bharata as the main deity. In May 2017, the tallest statue of lord Bharata with a height of 45 ft (35 ft body + 12 ft pedestal) weighing about 50 tons was erected in Mangalgiri (Shri kshetra bharat ka bharat), Sagar, Madhya Pradesh, India. Earlier, a 57 ft tall monolithic statue comprising 45 ft body and 12 ft pedestal weighing about 100 tons was planned to be erected. However, it was broken in the process of erection and therefore, a shorter statue was created and successfully erected.

== In literature ==
Ādi purāṇa, a 10th-century Jain text deals with the ten lives of the first tirthankara, Rishabhanatha, also known as Adinatha, and his two sons, Bharata and Bahubali. Bharatesha Vaibhava : also known as Bharatesvara Charite depicts the life story of Bharata Chakravartin was written in the 16th century by Ratnakaravarni.

=== Rajasthani ===
- Bharateshwara Bahubali Ghora composed by Vajrasena Suri in 1168, is a poem with 48 verses describing the battle between Bharata and Bahubali.

=== Gujarati ===
- Bharateshwara Bahubaliras composed by Shalibhadra Suri in 1184, is a poem with 203 stanzas describing the struggle of power between Bharata and Bahubali.

== See also ==
- Chandragupta Maurya
