= Auspicious dreams in Jainism =

14 or 16 dreams depicted in Jainism

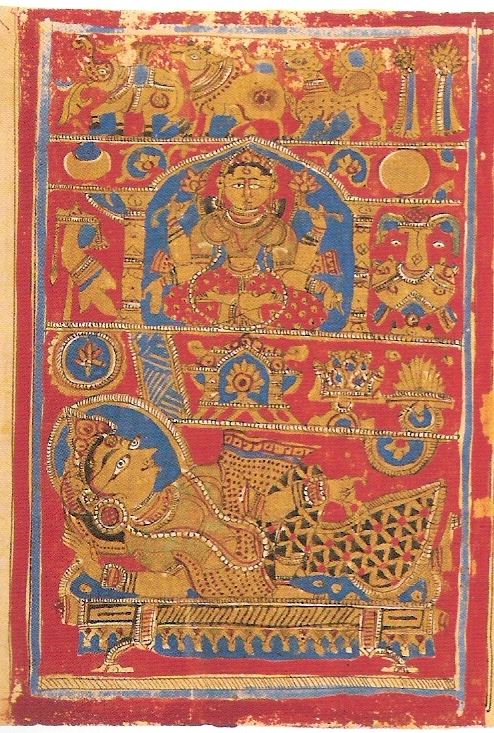
Queen Trishala, Mahavira's mother has 14 auspicious dreams. Folio 4 from Kalpasutra

Auspicious dreams are often described in texts of Jainism which forecast the virtue of children. Their number varies according to different traditions and they described frequently as fourteen or sixteen dreams. They are seen by mothers of the prominent figures in Jainism including Tirthankaras, on the conception of their soul in the womb. They are interpreted as describing virtues and kingship of a future child. They are also found in various artistic media as an ornamentation.

== Dreams ==
Their number and description differ according to major traditions of Jainism. According to Digambara tradition, there are 16 dreams while according to Śvetāmbara tradition, there are 14 dreams. Most of them are same. They are described in detail as dreams of queen Trishala, mother of Mahavira, in some Jain texts.

Auspicious dreams
No. Digambara	No. Śvetāmbara	Name	Image	Dream	Interpretation
1	1	Airavata	Airavata	White elephant with four tusks, similar to the elephant of the god Indra	Mother would give birth to a child with good character. The four tusk of elephant depicts the four components of Sangha: monks, nuns, laymen and laywomen.
2	2	Vrishabha	Vrishabha	Bull	The dream foretold the birth of a great religious Teacher who would spread the light of knowledge.
3	3	Simha	Sinha	Lion	Power, strength and fearlessness. The child will be strong as the lion, in overcoming all enemies.
4	4	Lakshmi	Laxmi	The goddess of wealth, Lakshmi or Shri	Wealth and prosperity
5	5	Phul-mala	Phulmala	Pair of garlands	Popularity and respect
6	6	Chandra	Purnima Chandra	Moon	Peace and help to others
7	7	Surya	Surya	Sun	Supreme knowledge
-	8	Dhvaja	Dhvaja	Flag with lion pictured on it flying on golden stick	Leadership
8	-	Meena-yugma	Meenyugma	Pair of fishes	Handsomeness
9	9	Purna Kalasha	Purna Kalasha	Full jug / pair of full vases with lotuses	Perfect in virtues and would be full of compassion for all living beings. The kalasha is considered auspicious in Dharmic religions.
10	10	Padma Sarovar	Padma Sarovar	Lotus pond / celestial lake	Detachment from worldly possessions
11	11	Ratnakar	Ratnakar	Ocean / rough ocean	Achievement of infinite perception and knowledge, spiritual liberation
12	-	Simhasana	Sinhasana	Large, resplendent, golden throne set with bright diamonds and rubies	Son will become the World Teacher
13	12	Deva-Vimana	Dev Vimana	Celestial cheriot palace	Angels in heaven would respect, honor his spiritual teachings
14	-	Palace	Palace	The rising residence of Nāgendra, the lord of the devas of the Nāgakumāra clan	Child will be born with clairvoyance
15	13	Ratnadhag	Ratnadhag	Heap of jewels	Virtues and wisdom
16	14	Nirdhumra Agni	Nirdhumra Agni	Smokeless fire	Reform and restoration of religious order. He would burn his karmas and attain salvation.

These dreams features animals, objects and a goddess associated with positive virtues and kingship. They are generally considered positive symbols in Indian culture so they frequently appear in other Indian religions like Buddhism and Hinduism.

== Importance ==
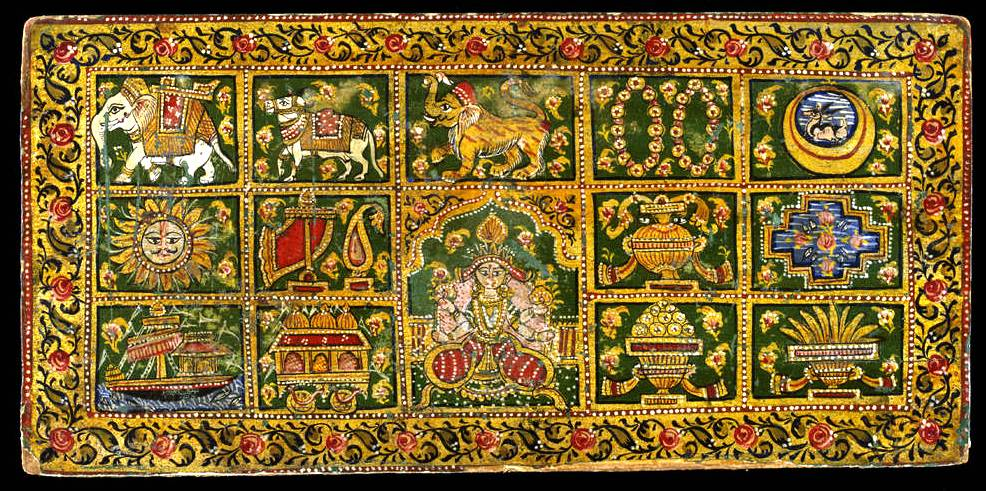
Auspicious 14 dreams seen by a tirthankara's mother during pregnancy as an ornamentation on cover of 19th-century manuscript

=== In texts ===
These dreams are connected with the births of Tirthankaras and the other prominent people including Chakravarti, Balabhadra/Baladeva and Vāsudeva in Jainism. They are 63 in total and called Shalakapurusha. Their mothers see a certain number of dreams on conception of their soul in womb. They are described in the great detail in Kalpasutra. 12th century Jain monk Hemchandracharya described and interpreted them in detail in Trishashthishalakapurush. Avashyak-niryukti, an early verse-commentary in Prakrit, explains relation of names of some Tirthankaras and these dreams.

Foretelling as per Kalpasutra
Number of dreams	What it foretells
14 dreams	birth of a future Tirthankara or Chakravarti (universal monarch)
7 of the 14 dreams	birth of a future Vāsudeva
4 of the 14 dreams	birth of a future Baladeva/Balabhadra
1 of the 14 dreams	birth of a future Mandalika (king)

=== Festivals ===
On the fifth day of festival of Paryusana, Jain monks read or narrate the portion of the Kalpasutra dealing with birth of last Tirthankara Mahavira, to the Jain lay people. They are displayed to the people in the form of silver models and auctioned for temporary possession and display to other people for festive days.

=== Other ===
These dreams are symbolised and found in artistic media like paintings in manuscripts and on its covers, books, ornamentation in stone carvings, invitation scrolls and temple furnitures.
