= Neminatha =

22nd Jain Tirthankara

Neminath
- 22nd Tirthankara
- Member of Tirthankar, Salakapurusha, Arihant and Siddha
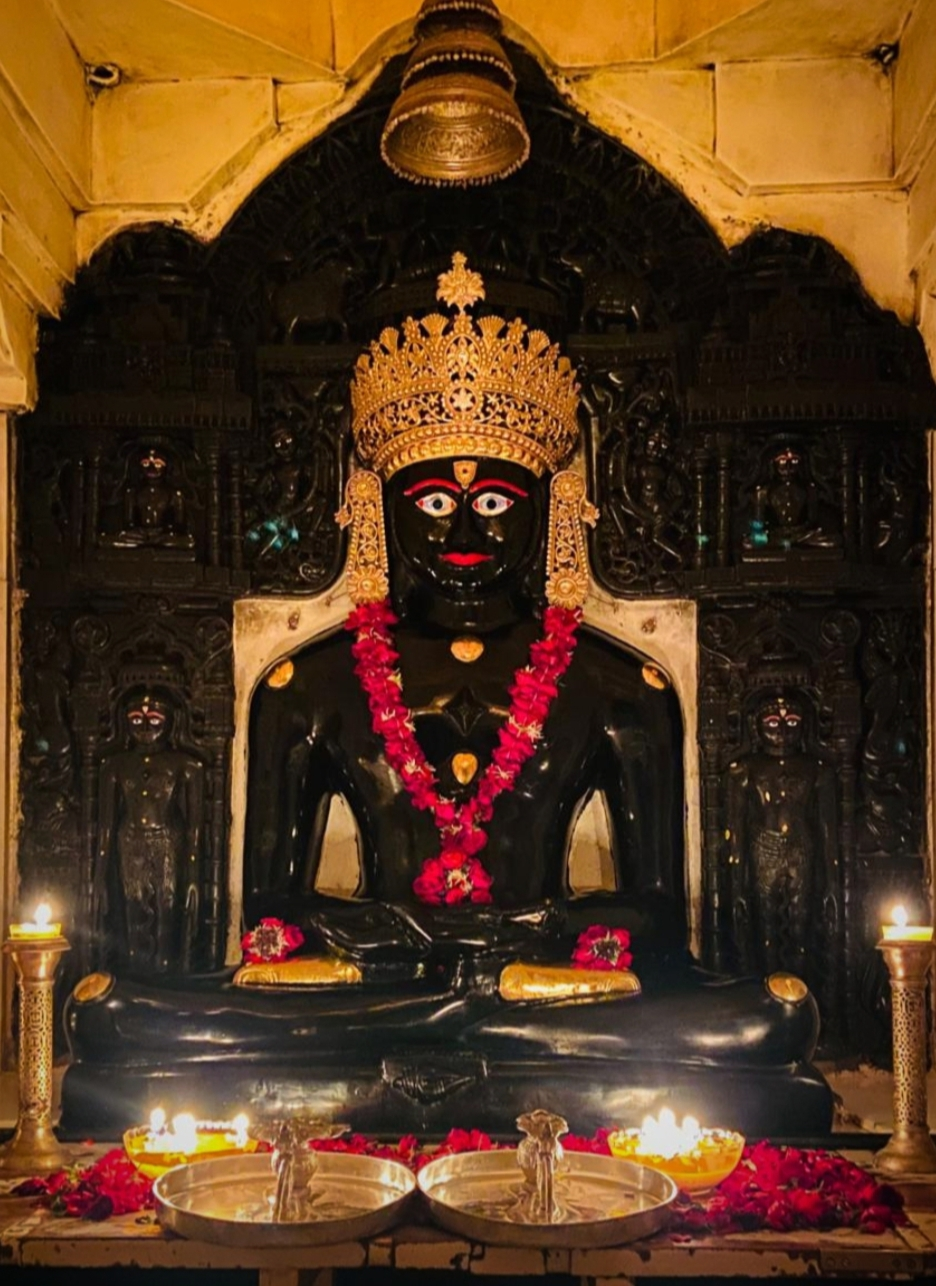
- Neminatha Idol at Girnar Jain Temple, Gujarat
- Other names: Ariṣṭanemi, Nemi, Nem
- Venerated in: Jainism
- Predecessor: Naminatha
- Successor: Parshvanatha
- Symbol: Conch Shankha
- Height: 10 bows – 98 feet (30 m)
- Age: 1000
- Color: Black
- Gender: Male

Genealogy
- Born: Ariṣṭanemi; Śaurīpura
- Died: Girnar
- Parents: Samudravijaya (father); Śivādevī (mother)
- Dynasty: Yaduvaṁśa—Harivaṁśa

Neminatha (Devanagari: नेमिनाथ) (Sanskrit: नेमिनाथः), also known as Nemi and Ariṣṭanemi (Devanagari: अरिष्टनेमि), is the 22nd tirthankara of Jainism in the present cosmic age (Avasarpini). Along with Mahavira, Pārśvanātha and Rishabhanatha, he is one of the most devotionally revered tirthankaras within the Jain tradition. While his physical historical existence is debated by modern scholars, Indologists such as Damodar Dharmananda Kosambi connect him to the sage Ghora Angirasa from the Vedic Chandogya Upanishad, who instructed Krishna in the virtues of absolute nonviolence (ahimsa). Jain tradition calculates that Neminatha lived tens of thousands of years before the 23rd tirthankara, Pārśvanātha; general accounts cite a gap of 84,000 years, while specific texts like Hemachandra's Trishashtishalakapurusha Charitra calculate the gap at 81,000 years.

In Jain theology and literature, Neminatha is celebrated as a contemporary and cousin of the Hindu deity Krishna, born into the Yadu dynasty in the city of Śaurīpura. His parents are named as Samudravijaya and Shivadevi Jain epics, such as the Harivamsa Purana, utilize the dynamic between the two cousins to contrast Krishna's violent, worldly conquests with Neminatha's supreme spiritual asceticism. Traditional accounts mention his date of birth as the fifth day of Shravan Shukla of the Jain calendar.

Neminatha's defining mythological narrative centers on his profound compassion. Jain tradition holds that upon hearing the cries of animals penned for slaughter at his wedding feast, he immediately renounced his betrothed, Rajmati, his royal lineage, and all worldly attachments (aparigraha). He retreated to Mount Girnar in the Saurashtra region of modern-day Gujarat, where he became an Jain monk and ultimately attained omniscience (Kevala Jnana) and liberation (moksha).

Due to his exclusive geographical association with his ascetic life and liberation, Mount Girnar evolved into one of the most prominent and historically contested Jain pilgrimage sites on the Indian subcontinent. In Jain iconography, Neminatha is traditionally identified by a dark-bluish complexion and the conch shell (shankha) emblem. He is frequently depicted alongside his dedicated guardian deities, the Yaksha Gomedha (or Sarvanha) and the highly venerated Yakshi Ambika.

== Nomenclature ==
The name Neminatha consists of two Sanskrit words, Nemi which means "rim, felly of a wheel" or alternatively "thunderbolt", and natha which means "lord, patron, protector".

According to the 9th-10th century CE Jain text Uttarapurana of Jinasena (Digambara monk), as well as the explanation of Hemachandra (11th century CE Śvetāmbara monk), it was the ancient Indian deity Indra who named the 22nd tirthankara as Neminatha, because he viewed the Jina as the "rim of the wheel of dharma".

In Śvetāmbara Jain texts, his name Aristanemi came from a dream his mother had during pregnancy, where she saw a "wheel of Arista jewels". His full name is mentioned as Aristanemi which is an epithet of the sun-chariot. Neminatha's name is spelled close to the 21st tirthankara Naminatha.

== Historicity and textual sources ==
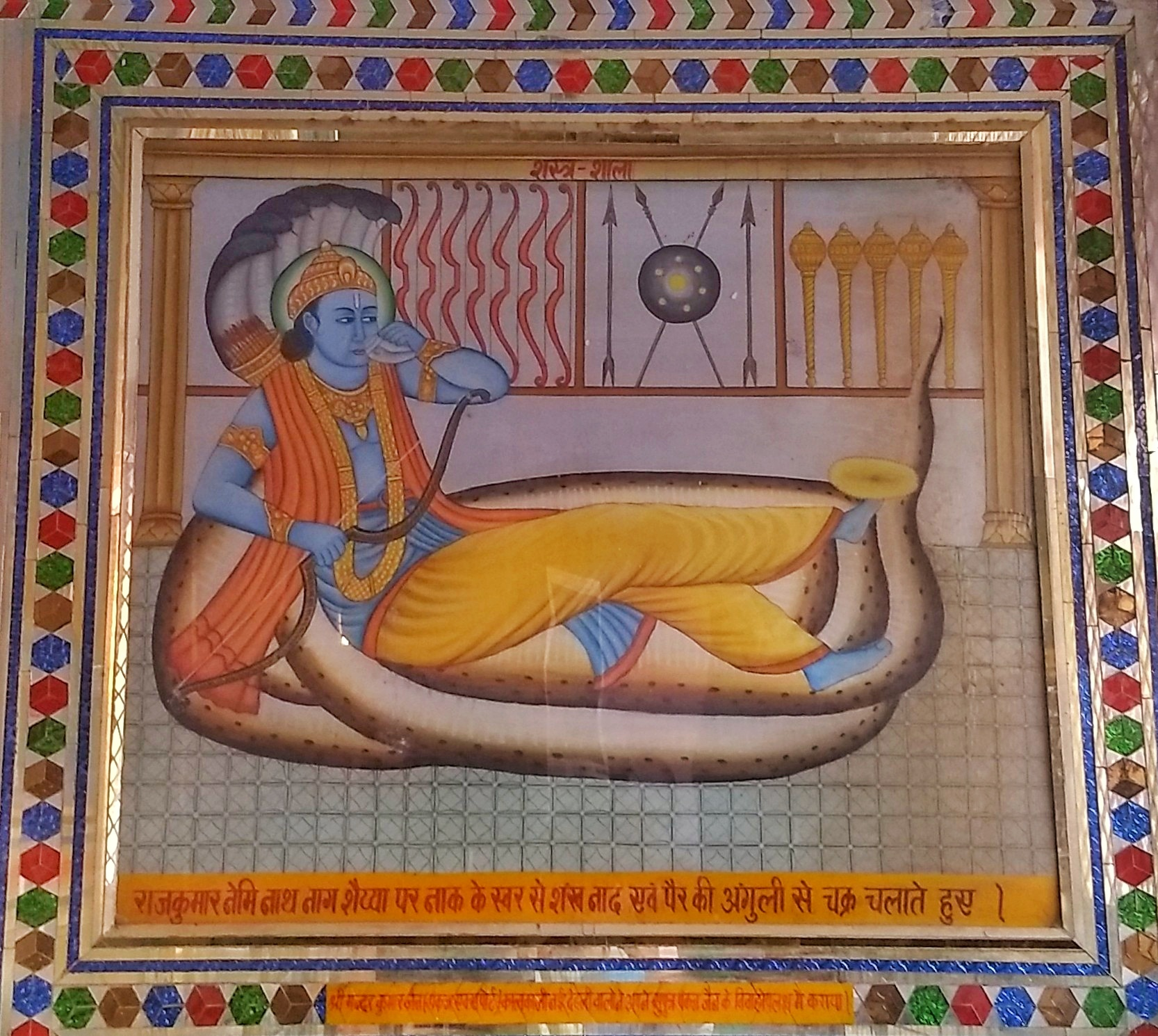
Depiction of Neminatha on snake as bed, chakra on foot finger and conch played by nose at Tijara Jain temple, Rajasthan

Determining Neminatha's historical existence is a challenge for modern scholars, as his life blends epic mythology with the late Vedic period. While historians widely accept the 23rd and 24th tirthankaras (Pārśvanātha and Mahavira) as verifiable historical figures, Neminatha's physical existence is highly debated and linked to the historicity of the Vrishni heroes.

=== Vedic references ===
Jain tradition considers the names "Neminatha" and "Arishtanemi" in the Rigveda and the Yajurveda as evidence of his antiquity. Traditional Jain scholars view these hymns as direct references to the 22nd tirthankara. However, academic scholars such as Paul Dundas and Natubhai Shah remain cautious, suggesting these terms might have been general Vedic titles before they were incorporated into Jain universal history.

=== The Ghora Angirasa hypothesis ===
Academic support for Neminatha's existence often relies on the "Ghora Angirasa hypothesis," based on the Chandogya Upanishad (3.17.6). This text mentions a teacher named Ghora Angirasa who taught Krishna about asceticism, charity, truthfulness, and nonviolence (ahimsa). Because these principles match the core vows of Jainism, historians like Damodar Dharmananda Kosambi suggest Ghora Angirasa was either Neminatha himself or an early proto-Jain ascetic whose life inspired the later Neminatha narrative.

=== Jain sources ===
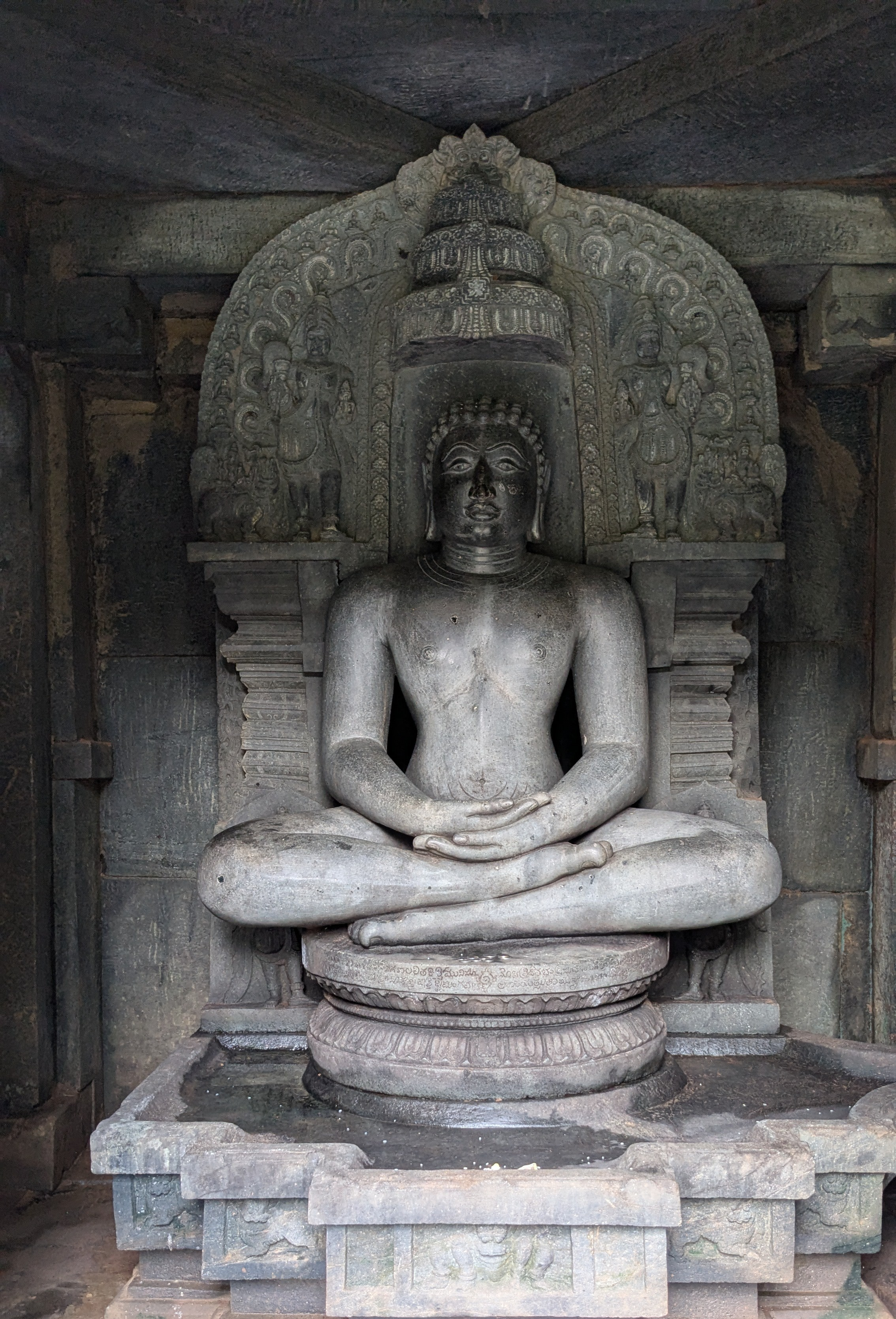
Idol of Neminatha at Ancient Jain Basadi, Gerusoppa, Karnataka

Jinasena's Harivaṃśapurāṇa includes Jain traditions about Neminatha, using his relationship with his cousin Krishna to argue that Jain asceticism is superior to worldly military power. The text features a legend where Neminatha easily defeats Krishna in a friendly test of strength. The Kalpa Sutra details his ascetic life, stating he ate only once every three days, meditated for 55 days to gain omniscience, and led a monastic order of 18,000 male and 44,000 female monks. It also describes an incident where a young Neminatha effortlessly blew Krishna's heavy conch shell.

Hemachandra's Trishashthishalakapurushacharitra chronicles Neminatha's past lives, including his time as King Supratishtha, and his ascetic purification. A palm-leaf manuscript outlining his earthly biography, the Neminatha-Charitra, was written between 1138 and 1142 CE and is preserved at theShantinatha Bhandara in Khambhat.

Neminatha's separation from his betrothed, Rajmati, is a major theme in Jain poetry, used to contrast unfulfilled worldly love with spiritual sacrifice. This story is featured in Vijayachandrasuri's 14th-century poem Rajal-Barahmasa and Vinaychandra's 1269 poem Neminatha Chatushpadika. It also shaped the medieval Gujarati fagu poetry genre, including works like Rajshekhar's Neminatha Fagu (1344), Jayashekhar's Neminatha Fagu (1375), and Somsundar's Rangasagara Neminatha Fagu (1400). In South India, the 13th-century Kannada poet Janna wrote the incomplete epic Arddha Nemi (The Unfinished Life of Nemi). Devotional works also feature him extensively, such as the Nemidutam written by Acharya Jinasena in the ninth century.

== Life ==
Neminatha was the 22nd tirthankara (ford-maker) of the avasarpiṇī (present descending cycle of Jain cosmology). Jain tradition places him as a contemporary of Krishna, the ninth and last vasudeva. There was a gap of 581,750 years between Neminatha and his predecessor, Naminatha as per traditional beliefs. Traditional accounts state he lived roughly 84,000 years before the 23rd tirthankara, Parshvanatha, though specific texts like Hemachandra's Trishashtishalakapurusha Charitra calculate the gap as 81,000 years.

=== Birth ===
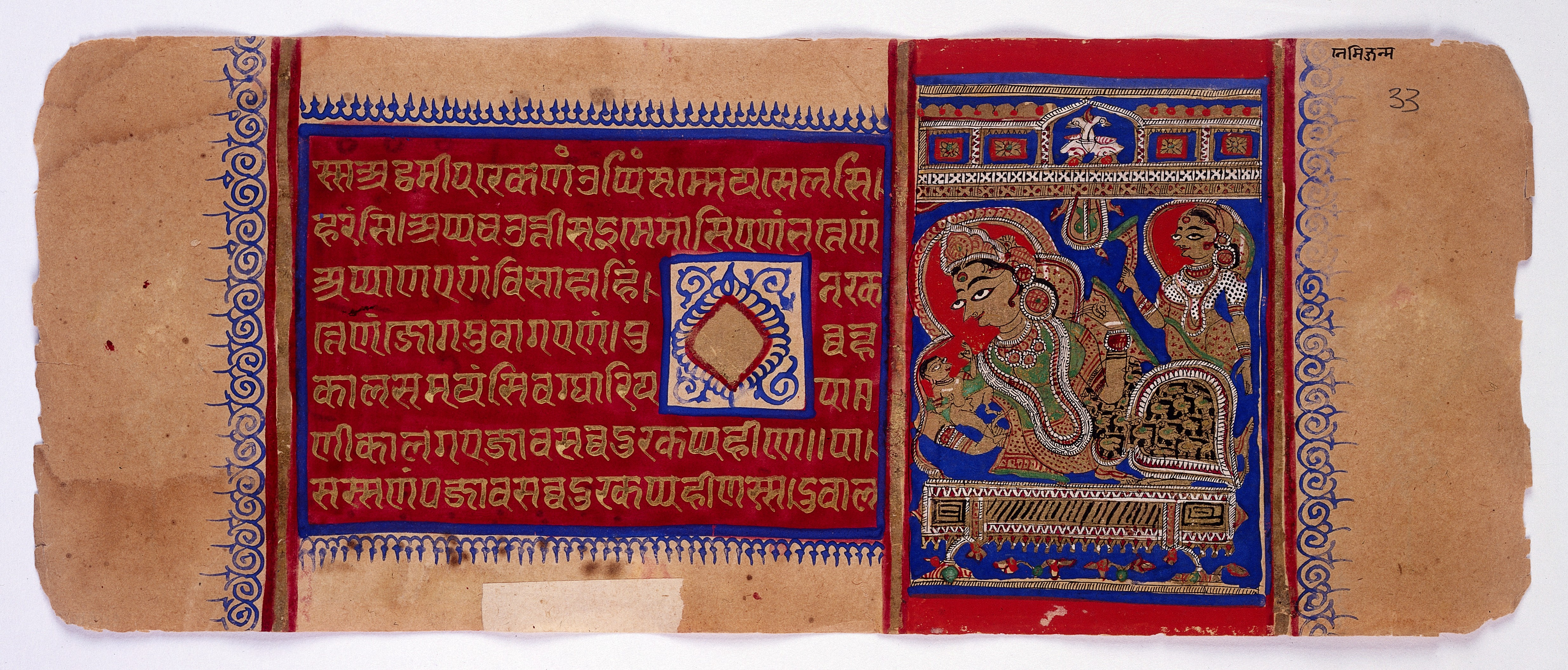
The birth of Aristanemi, Kalpa Sūtra

Neminatha is mentioned as the youngest son of king Samudravijaya and queen Shivadevi of the Yadu lineage, born at Śaurīpura. He is believed to have become fond of animals in his early life due to being in a cattle-herding family. Jain legends places him in the Girnar-Kathiawad (in Saurashtra region of modern-day Gujarat). His birth date is believed to be the fifth day of Shravana Shukla of the Hindu calendar.

=== Life before renunciation ===
He is believed to have been born with a dark-blue skin and complexion, a very handsome but shy young man. His height is mentioned as 10 dhanusha. His father is mentioned as the brother of Vasudeva, Krishna's father, therefore he is mentioned as the cousin of Krishna in Trishashti-salaka-purusha-charitra. Sculptures found in Kankali Tila, Mathura of Kushana period depicts Krishna and Balarama as cousins of Neminatha.

In one of the legends, on being taunted by Satyabhama, wife of Krishna, Neminatha is depicted to have blown Panchajanya, the mighty conch of Krishna through his nostrils. According to the texts, no one could lift the conch except Krishna, let alone blow it. After this event, the Harivaṃśapurāṇa, as composed by Jinasena, states that Krishna decided to test Neminatha's strength and challenged him for a friendly duel. Neminatha, being a tirthankara, is believed to have defeated Krishna easily. He is also mentioned as spinning a great Chakra with the right leg toe during his childhood.

=== Renunciation ===
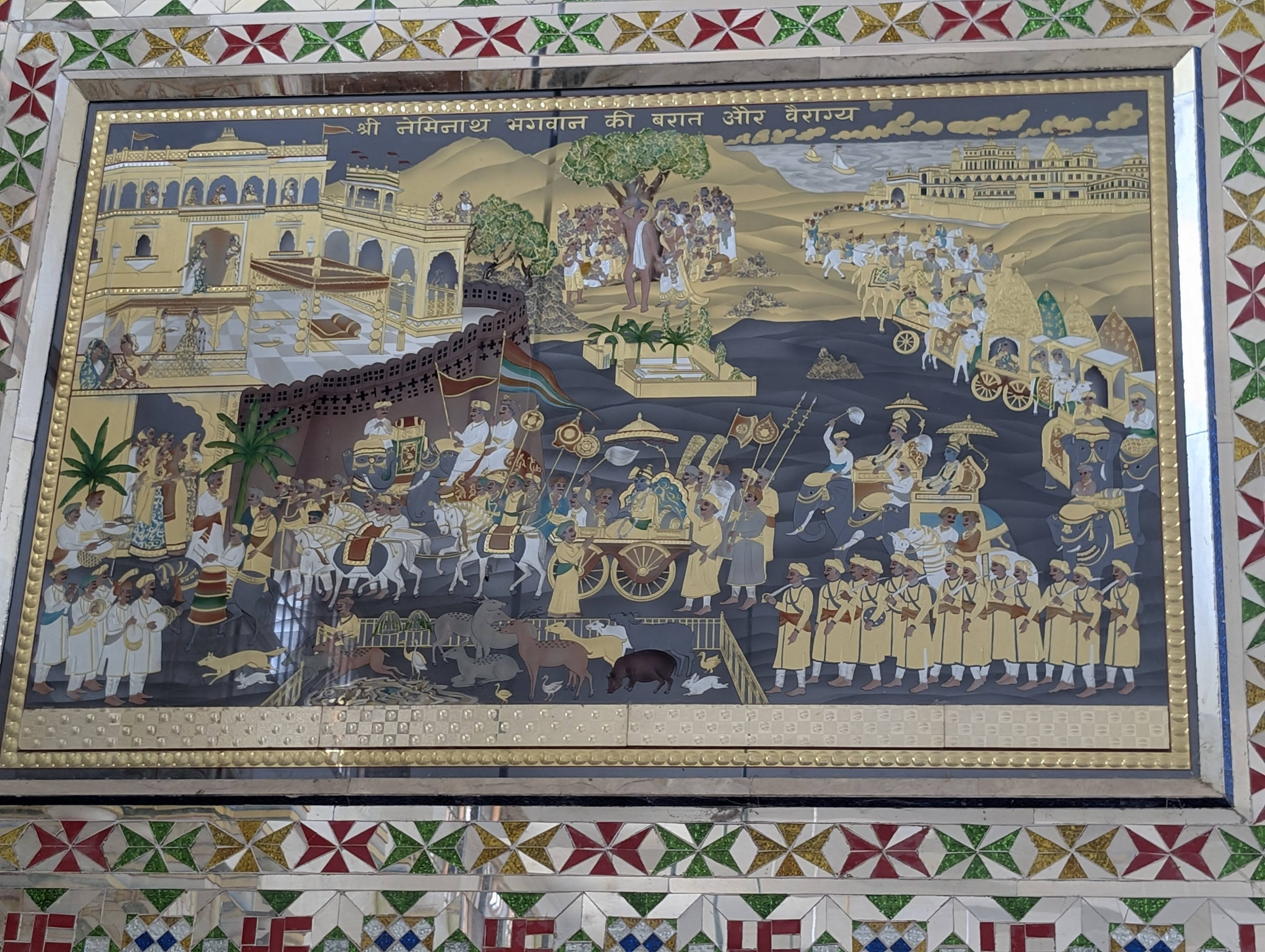
Wedding procession of Neminatha, 22nd Jain tirthankara and his renunciation seeing pain of animals kept for slaughter. Painting in Ranila Jain temple, Haryana

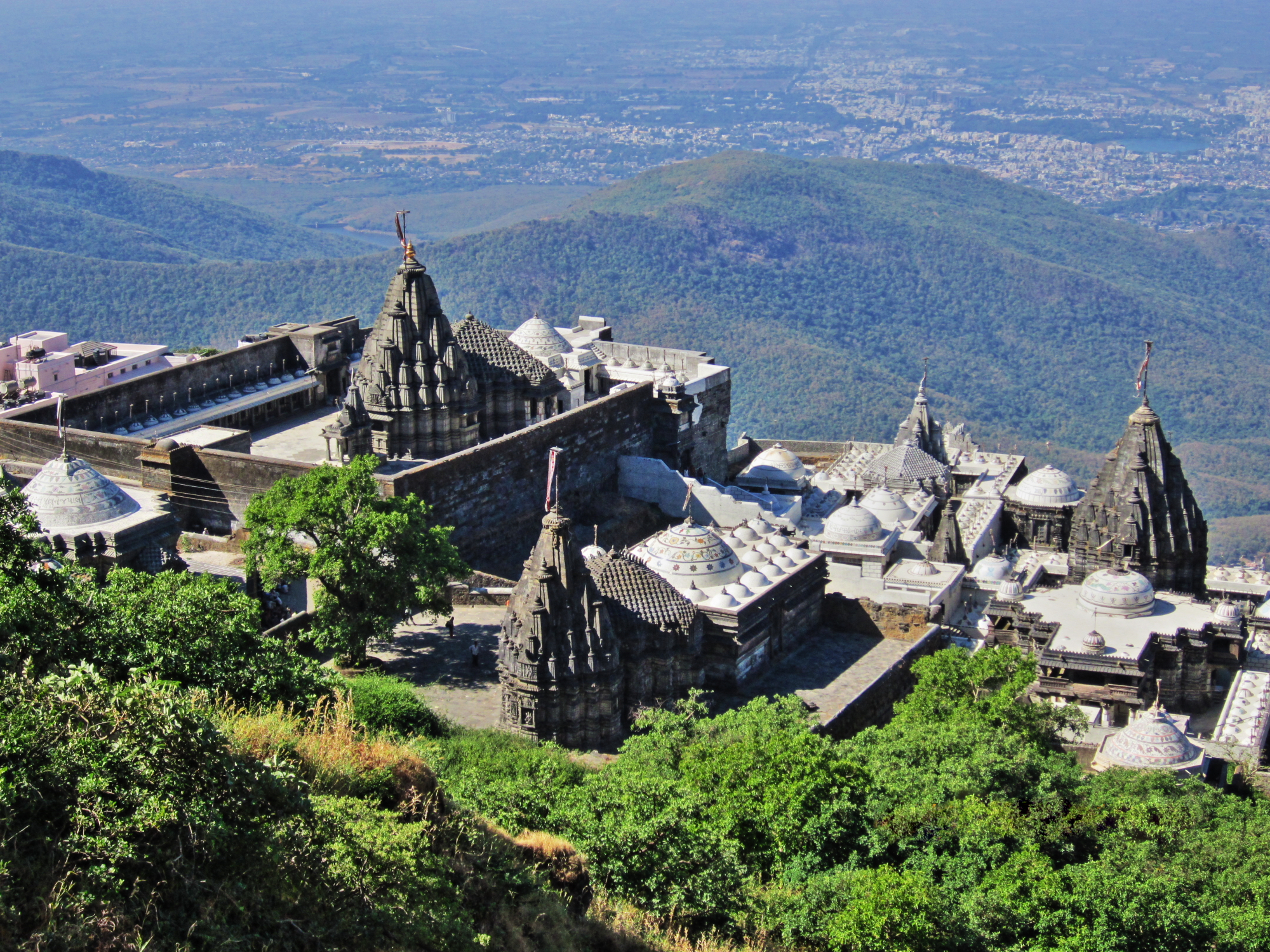
Neminatha temple complex on Girnar hills near Junagadh, Gujarat.

Jain tradition holds that the Neminatha's marriage was arranged with Rajulakumari or Rajimati or Rajamati, daughter of Ugrasena. Ugrasena is believed to be the king of Dvārakā and maternal grandfather of Krishna. He is believed to have heard animal cries as they were being slaughtered for the marriage feast. Taken over by sorrow and distress at the sight, he is believed to have given up the desire of getting married, and to have become a monk and gone to Mount Girnar. His bride-to-be Rajulakumari is believed to have followed him, becoming a nun and his brother Rahanemi became a monk, joining his ascetic order.

According to Kalpasutra, Neminatha led an ascetic life thereby eating only once every three days, meditated for 55 days and then obtained omniscience on Mount Raivataka, under a Mahavenu tree.

=== Disciples ===
According to Jain texts Neminatha had 11 Ganadhara with Varadatta as the leader of the Neminatha disciples. Neminatha's sangha (religious order) consisted of 18,000 male monks and 44,000 female monks as per the mentions in Kalpa Sutra.

=== Nirvana ===
He is said to have lived 1,000 years and spent many years spreading his knowledge and preaching principles of ahiṃsā (nonviolence) and aparigraha (asceticism) in the Saurashtra region. He is said to have attained moksha (nirvana) on the fifth peak or tonk (Urjayant Parvat) of Mount Girnar. Of these 1,000 years, he is believed to have spent 300 years as a bachelor, 54 days as an ascetic monk and 700 years as an omniscient being.

=== Cosmological context and past lives ===
In Jain theology, the attainment of the status of a tirthankara is not a sudden occurrence but the culmination of rigorous spiritual purification across multiple lifetimes. According to classical Jain texts, such as the Trishashthishalakapurushacharitra, the soul of Neminatha underwent numerous cycles of rebirth (bhavas) before its final earthly incarnation. Prominent past lives include his existence as King Supratishtha, during which the soul engaged in intense asceticism, and a subsequent rebirth as a celestial deity in the Aparajita heaven. It was during these prolonged periods of meditation and spiritual discipline that the soul accumulated the specific karmic merit (Tirthankara-nama-karma) required to be reborn as a spiritual ford-maker in the human realm.

== Teachings and philosophy ==
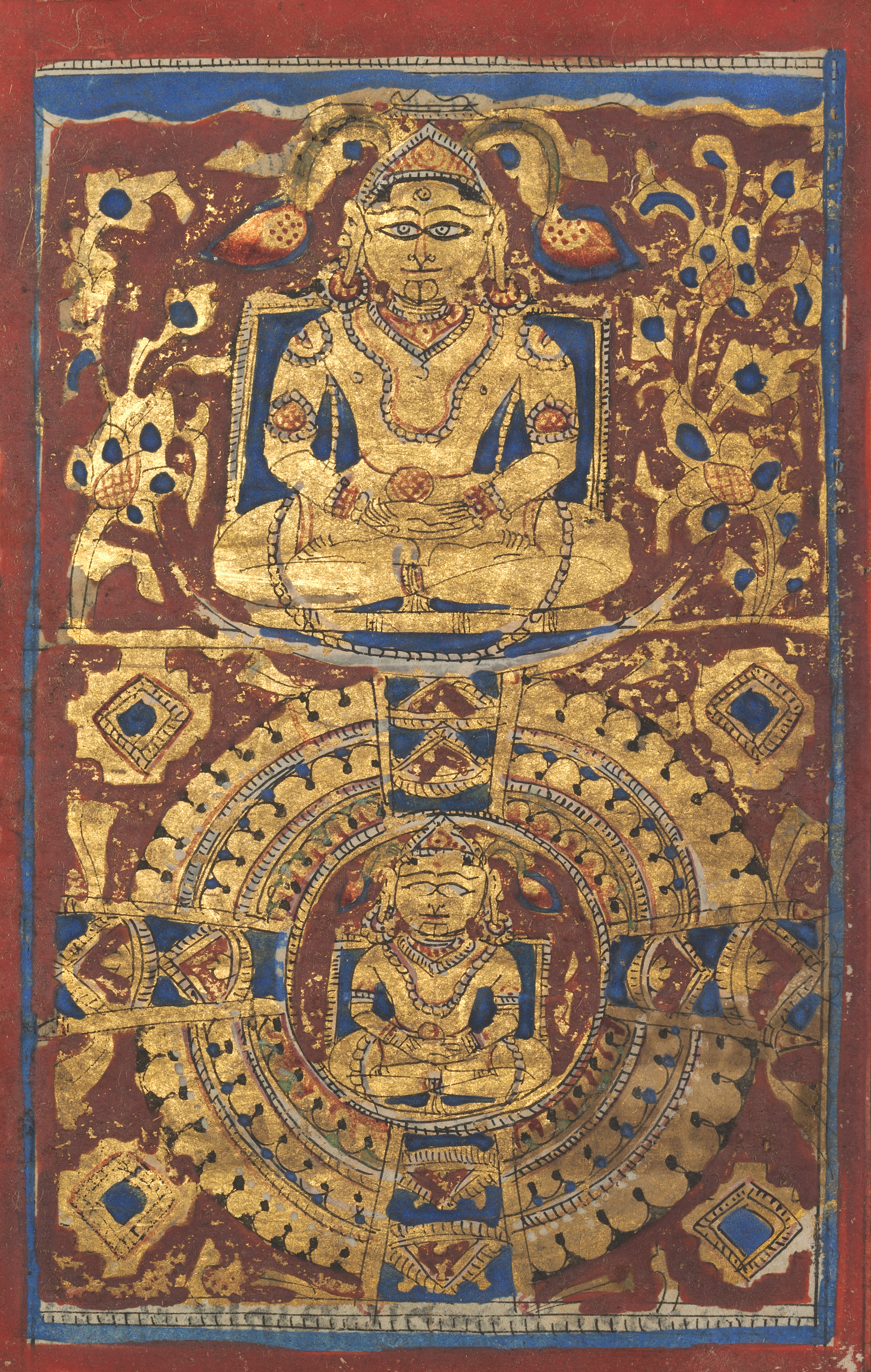
Teaching and Liberation of Neminatha from Kalpa-Sutra dated c. 1500

=== Doctrine of Absolute Nonviolence ===
Neminatha's primary philosophical contribution to Jainism is the absolute embodiment and elevation of nonviolence (ahimsa). Jain texts present his life as a practical demonstration of this principle. According to tradition, he experienced intense compassion (karuna) upon hearing the cries of animals meant for his wedding feast, realizing that personal happiness should not rely on the suffering of other living beings. This event shifted the focus of ahimsa from a strictly ascetic vow to a universal moral duty that supersedes social and familial obligations.

=== Principle of Non-Possession ===
Neminatha's teachings also emphasize non-attachment and non-possession (aparigraha). By abandoning his fiancé, Rajmati, and his royal Yadava lineage, his renunciation serves as a doctrinal example within Jainism. Neminatha taught that accumulating material wealth and maintaining emotional attachments are the primary causes of karmic bondage. His asceticism inspired Rajmati to also renounce the world, illustrating the Jain view that spiritual liberation (moksha) requires breaking worldly ties regardless of societal expectations.

=== Comparative Ethical Intersections ===
In comparative Indian philosophy, historians such as Jyotiprasad Jain note an ethical alignment between Neminatha's doctrines and the virtues found in the Hindu Chandogya Upanishad. As suggested by the Ghora Angirasa hypothesis, this shared philosophy prioritizes inner moral purity over external Vedic fire sacrifices. This intersection, which mirrors the Jain Five Vows, is highlighted by historian Harisatya Bhattacharya as a foundational influence on the spiritual development of the Yadava tradition. Additionally, the Mahabharata epic recognizes Neminatha as a spiritual teacher who imparted the path of salvation to King Sagara. Historian Natubhai Shah notes that earlier 20th-century theories attempting to link Neminatha to ancient Scandinavian or East Asian deities have been dismissed by modern historians due to a lack of evidence.

== Temples and pilgrimage ==
=== Mount Girnar and birthplace ===
Mount Girnar, historically known as Urjayantagiri or Raivataka, is a major site associated with Neminatha. Jain texts state that he was born in the Gangetic plains, but he renounced worldly life, attained omniscience, and achieved liberation (moksha) at Mount Girnar in Gujarat. The mountain has several peaks (tonks), and Jains believe he attained nirvana on the fifth peak.

Mount Girnar is a major Jain pilgrimage site (tirthas). During the medieval period, merchants, ministers, and lay followers funded the construction of stone and marble temples on its peaks.

The site has a history of sectarian conflict. From the 12th century onward, the Śvetāmbara and Digambara sects disputed ownership of the shrines. According to scholar Paul Dundas, medieval inscriptions and later legal battles show that sectarian leaders used control of the site to build their religious and regional influence.

Śaurīpura, located near Bateshwar, Uttar Pradesh, which is traditionally identified in Jain texts as the birthplace of Neminatha. The site contains Jain temples dedicated to him, managed by Digambara sect.

=== Other temples ===
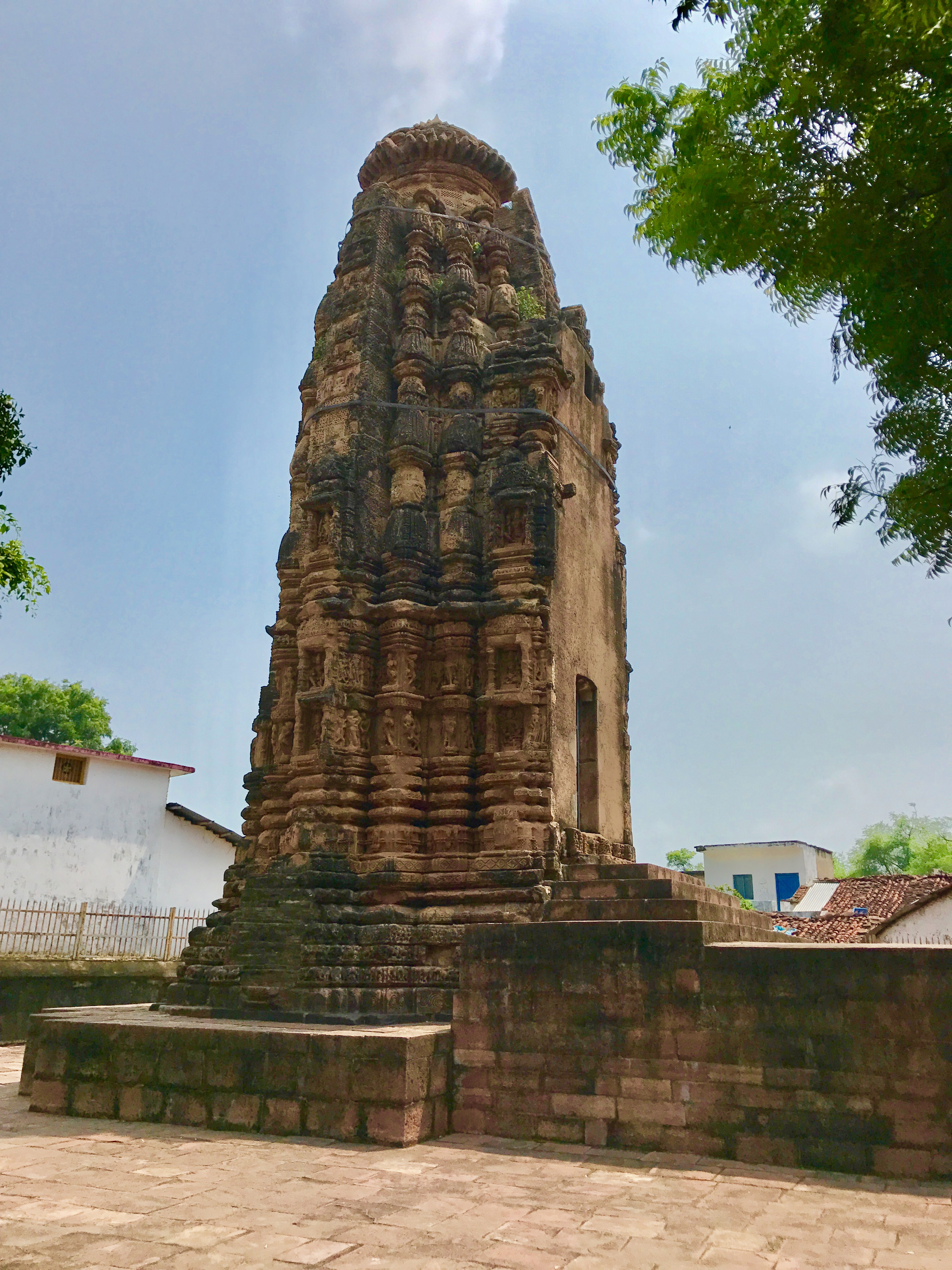
Bhand Dewal, 11th-century star-shaped temple in Arang, Chhattisgarh

In central India, Bhand Dewal is an 11th-century star-shaped temple in Arang, Chhattisgarh. It houses three black stone idols of tirthankaras, including Neminatha. In Madhya Pradesh, the Siddhachal Caves at Gwalior Fort feature rock-cut Jain sculptures excavated during the 15th-century Tomar dynasty. The site includes a rock-cut relief of Neminatha. Nemgiri in Jintur, Maharashtra, has cave temples carved during the 9th-century Rashtrakuta period. It is dedicated to Neminatha and contains a seated idol of him.

In eastern India, rock-cut relief sculptures of Neminatha are located within the Khandagiri caves near Bhubaneswar, Odisha. These images were excavated in the Navamuni, Barabhuji, and Ambika caves during the 11th century under the Somavamshi dynasty. The figures depict Neminatha independently and alongside his associated yaksha Gomedha and yakshi Ambika. A structural Jain temple located on Khandagiri Hill houses a seated idol of Neminatha alongside Mahavira and Munisuvrata.

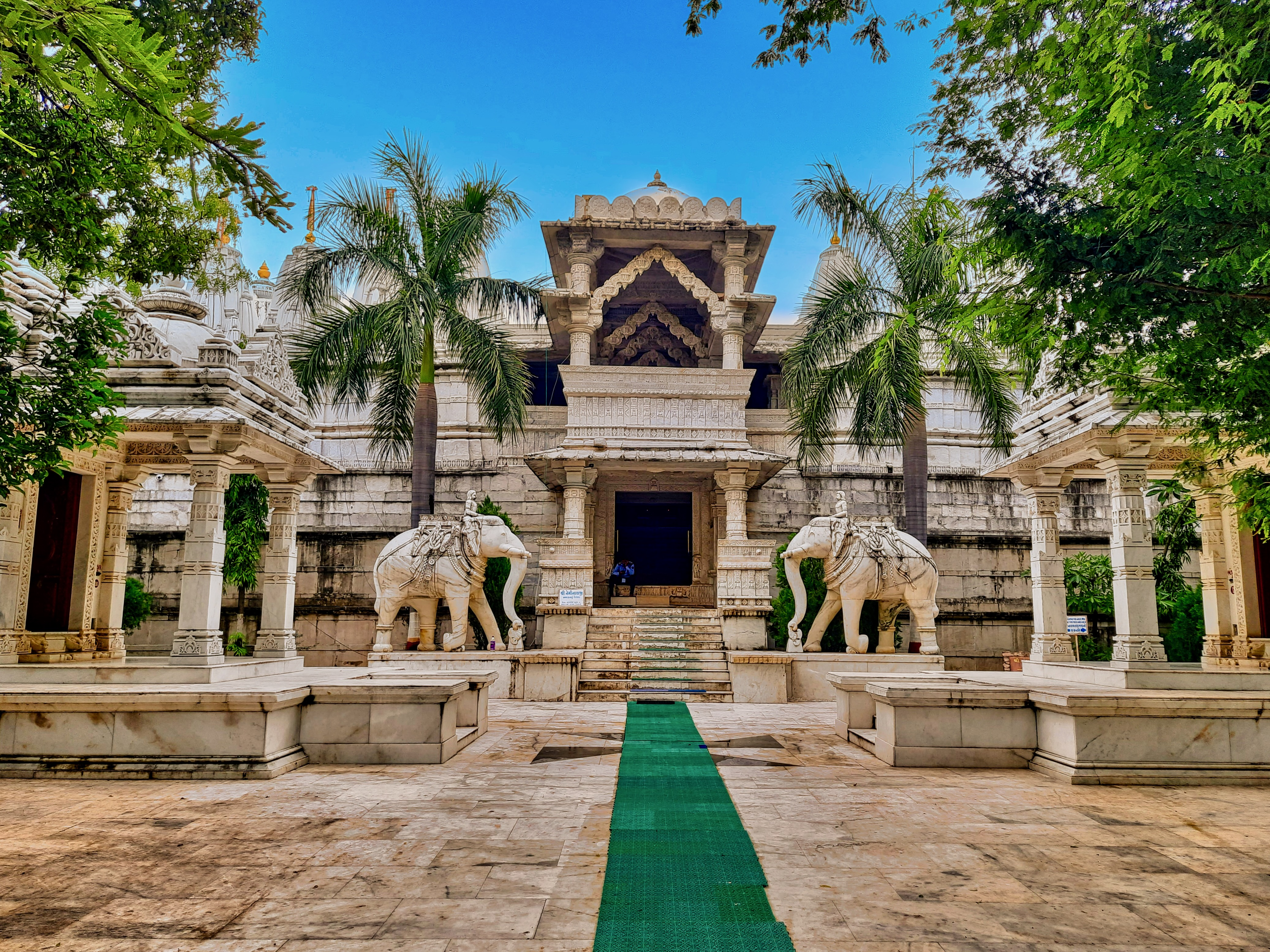
Neminatha temple, Kumbharia, Gujarat

In western India, the Neminatha temple in Kumbhariya, Banaskantha district, Gujarat, is part of a cluster of five Jain temples built during the 11th and 12th centuries. The structural complex features stone carvings and houses a central idol of Neminatha. In Rajasthan, the Luna Vasahi temple at Mount Abu was built in 1230 by Vastupala and Tejpal. Its carved ceilings depict scenes from Neminatha's life, including his betrothed Rajmati and his cousin Krishna.

The southern Indian states house several complexes dedicated to Neminatha. In Karnataka, the Lakshmeshwara Jain temples (Shank Basadi) were built in the 7th century during the Badami Chalukya dynasty. The Kalyani Chalukyas expanded the complex between the 10th and 12th centuries. The temple is named after an idol of Neminatha standing on a conch shell (shankha). It contains a large stone pillar carved with 1008 tirthankaras images, called the Sahasrakuta Jinabimba. The poet Adikavi Pampa wrote the Ādi purāṇa here in the 9th century. Also in Karnataka, Odegal Basadi is a 14th-century temple on Vindhyagiri Hill in Shravanabelagola, Karnataka. It has three separate shrines, and one of them is dedicated to Neminatha.

In Telangana, Kulpakji is a Śvētāmbara pilgrimage site dating back to the Rashtrakuta and Kalyani Chalukya periods. The red sandstone temple houses idols of Neminatha, Rishabhanatha, and Mahavira. In Tamil Nadu, Tirumalai (Jain complex) has a 16-foot rock-cut image of Neminatha, which was created in the 11th century under the Chola dynasty. The nearby Arahanthgiri Jain Math is a center for the Digambara sect.

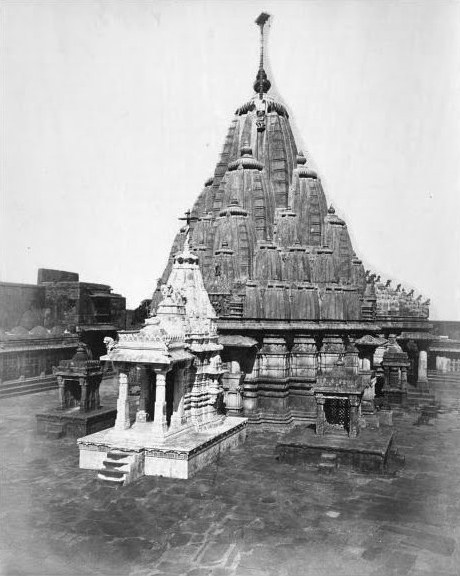
Neminath temple, Girnar, Gujarat in 1911, from northeast

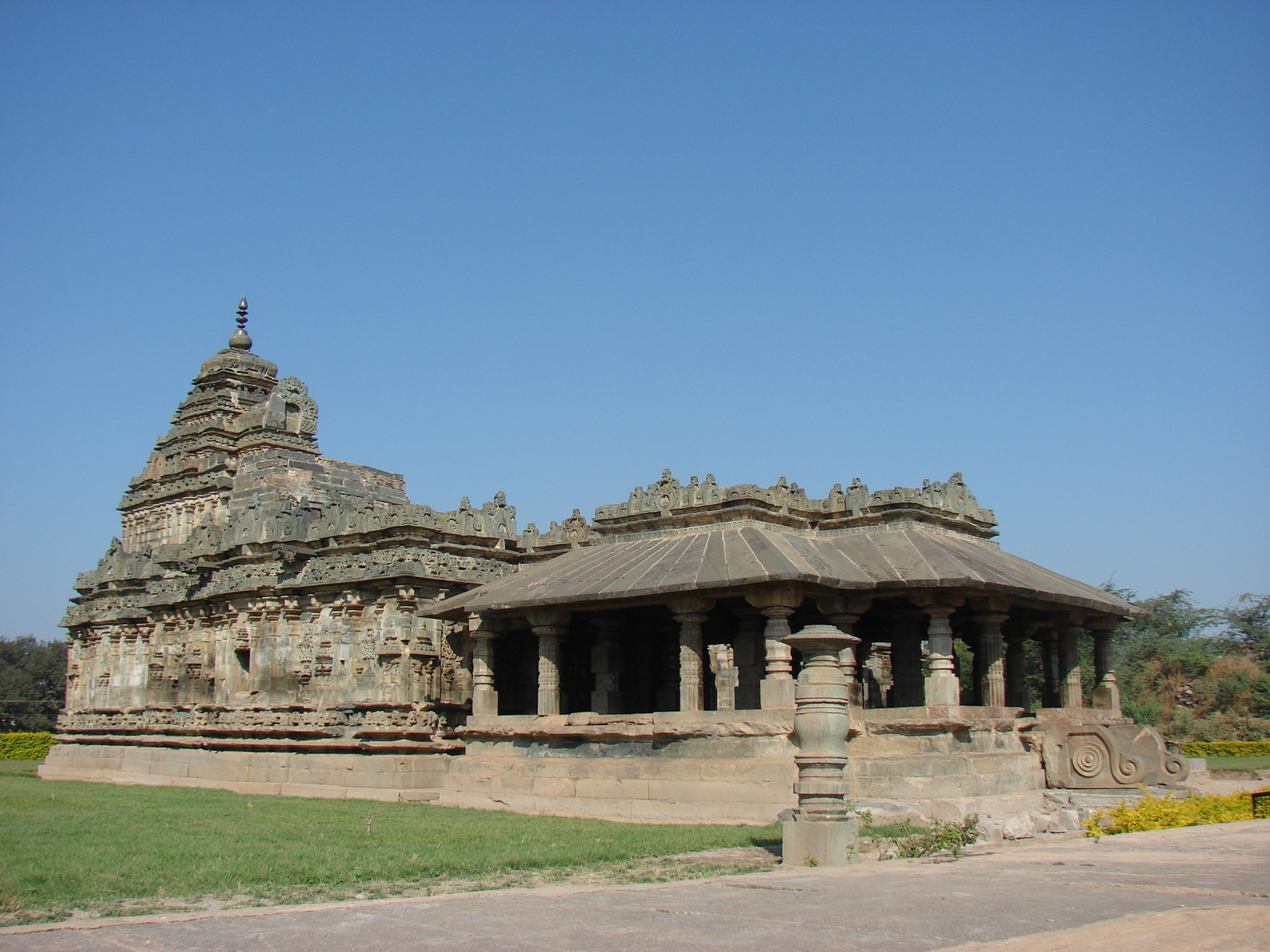
Brahma Jinalaya, Lakkundi, 11th century temple in Karnataka

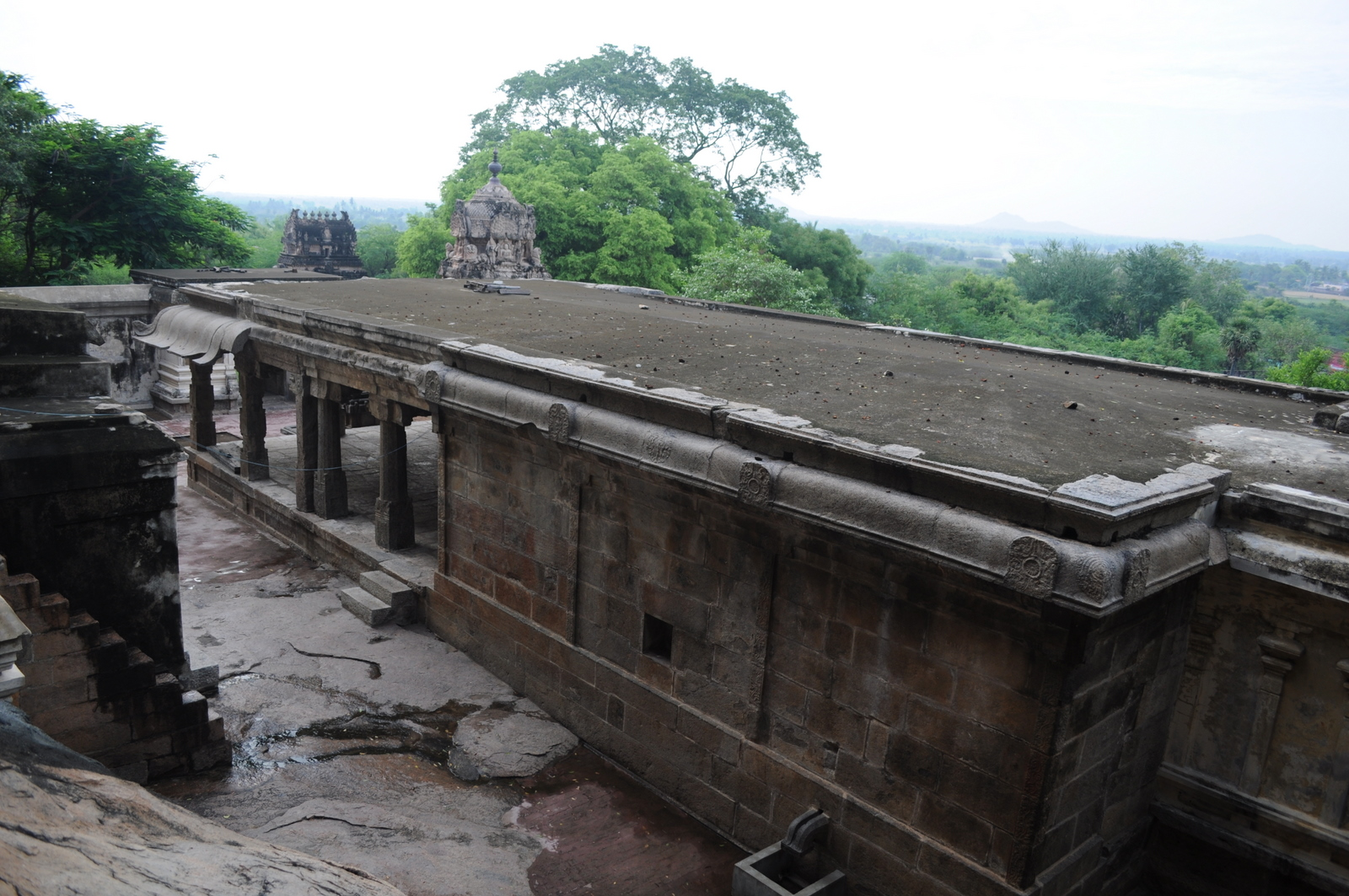
Arahanthgiri Jain Math in Tamil Nadu

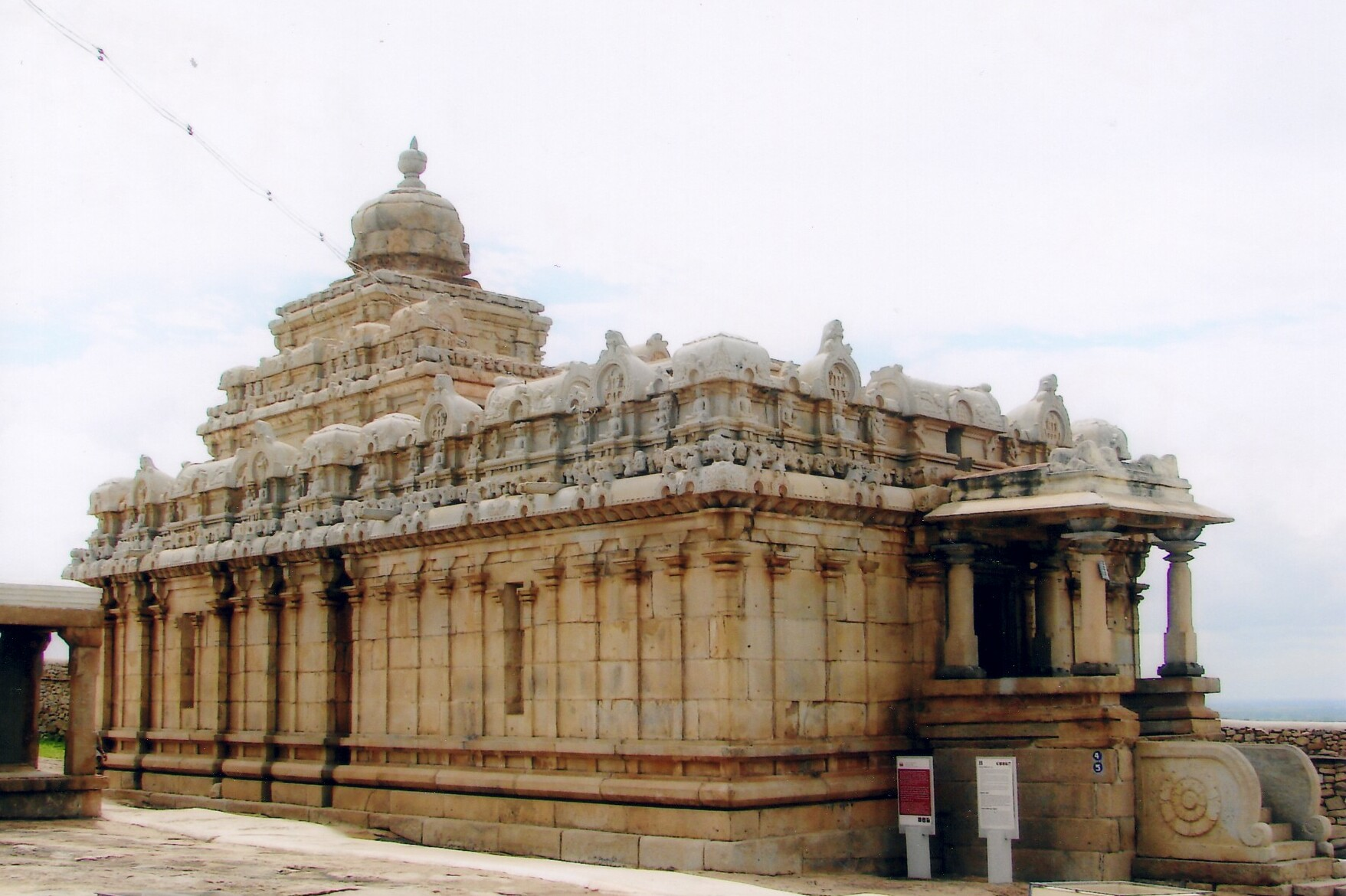
Chavundaraya Basadi in Shravanabelagola, Karnataka

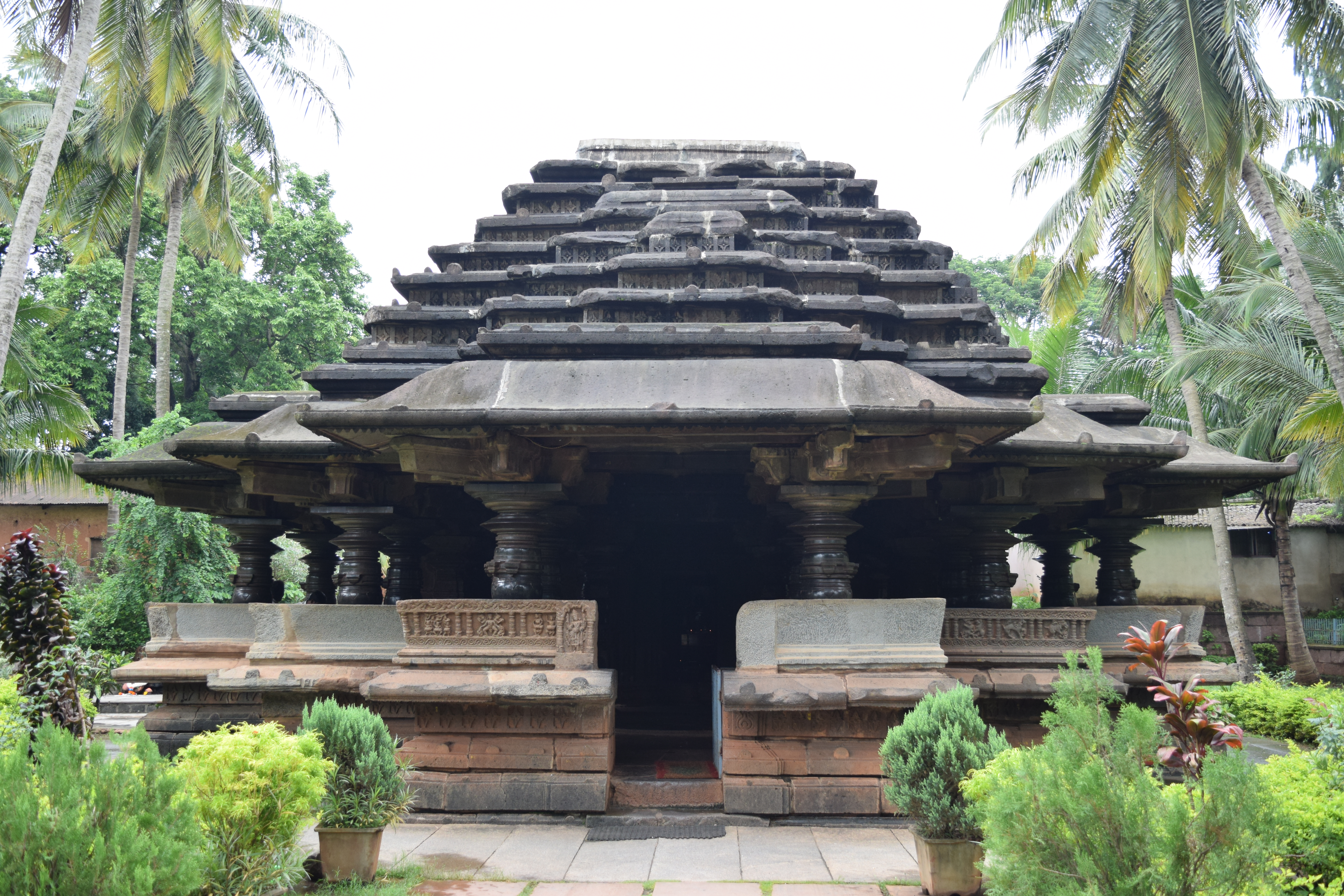
Kamal Basadi, Karnataka

== Role in Jain epics ==
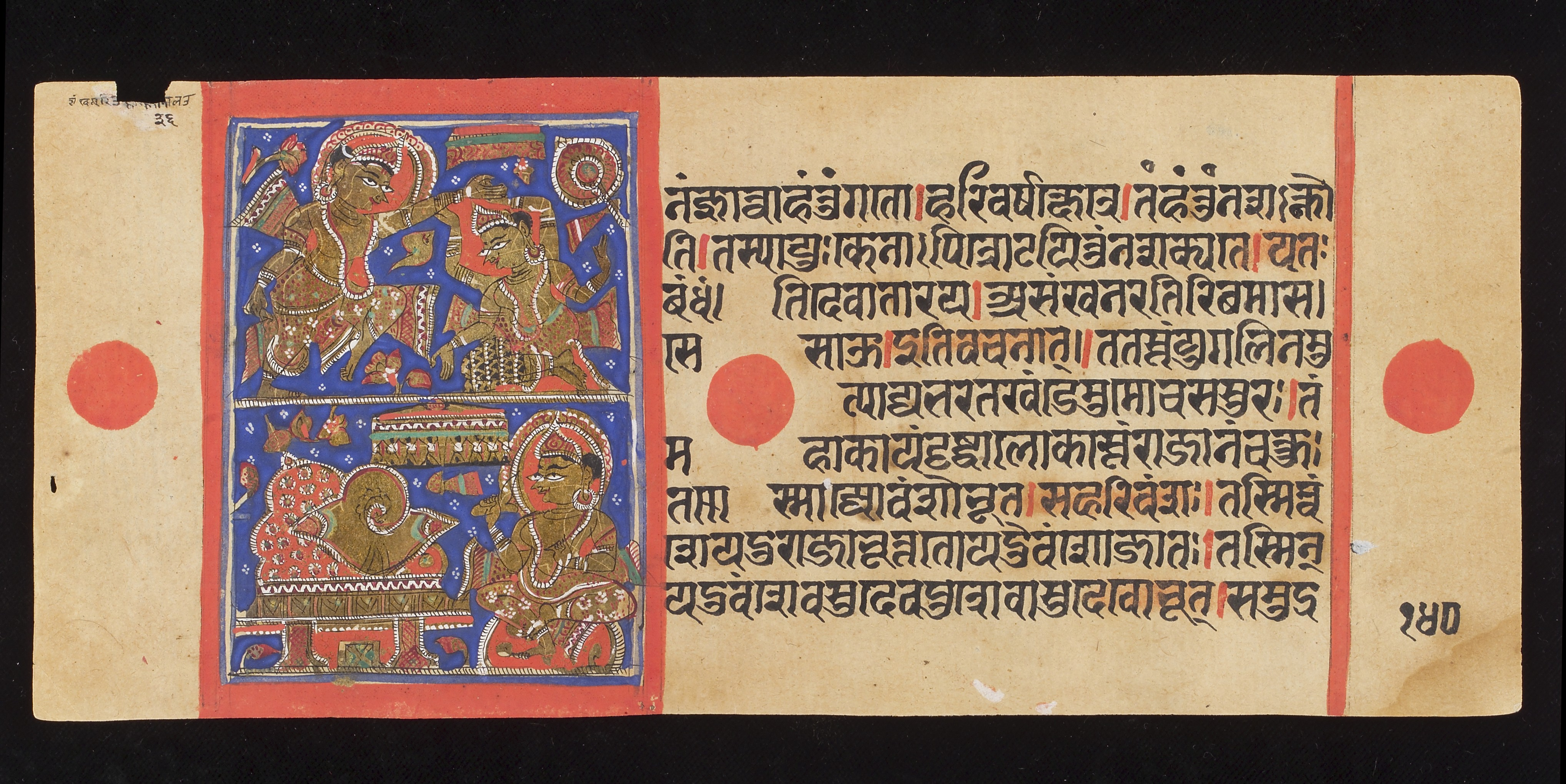
Kalpa Sūtra recto Neminatha's blowing Krishna's conch verso text

Jain literature presents a fundamentally distinct version of the Hindu epic, the Mahabharata, primarily through texts such as Jinasena's 8th-century Harivamsa Purana and Hemachandra's 12th-century Trishashthishalakapurushacharitra. In these Jain narratives, Neminatha serves as the ultimate theological anchor, and the dynamic between him and his cousin Krishna is utilized to establish the supremacy of Jain asceticism over Hindu martial prowess.

Within Jain universal history, historical figures are categorized by their spiritual and worldly roles. Krishna is classified as a Vasudeva (a violent, worldly hero destined to conquer the earth), while Neminatha is a tirthankara (a supreme, non-violent spiritual conqueror). Jain texts assert that Krishna’s political and military victories were only possible because Neminatha actively refused to compete for temporal power, choosing instead the path of renunciation.

A central theme of the Jain Mahabharata is the contrasting karmic destinies of the two cousins. Because Krishna engaged in and orchestrated the mass violence of the Kurukshetra War, Jain theology asserts that he accumulated severe negative karma, resulting in his subsequent rebirth in the third hell. In stark contrast, Neminatha’s absolute adherence to nonviolence allowed him to destroy all karmic bondage and attain liberation. Indologists Paul Dundas and John E. Cort note that this narrative structure was a deliberate theological strategy utilized by medieval Jain authors to domesticate and subordinate the immense popularity of the Hindu Krishna cult. By framing Krishna as a worldly subordinate to the spiritually supreme Neminatha, Jainism institutionally reinforced the superiority of asceticism over epic heroism.

In the war between Krishna and Jarasandha, Neminatha is believed to have participated alongside Krishna. This is believed to be the reason for celebrating Krishna-related festivals in Jainism and for intermingling with Hindus, who worship Krishna as one of the incarnations of Vishnu.

== Legacy ==
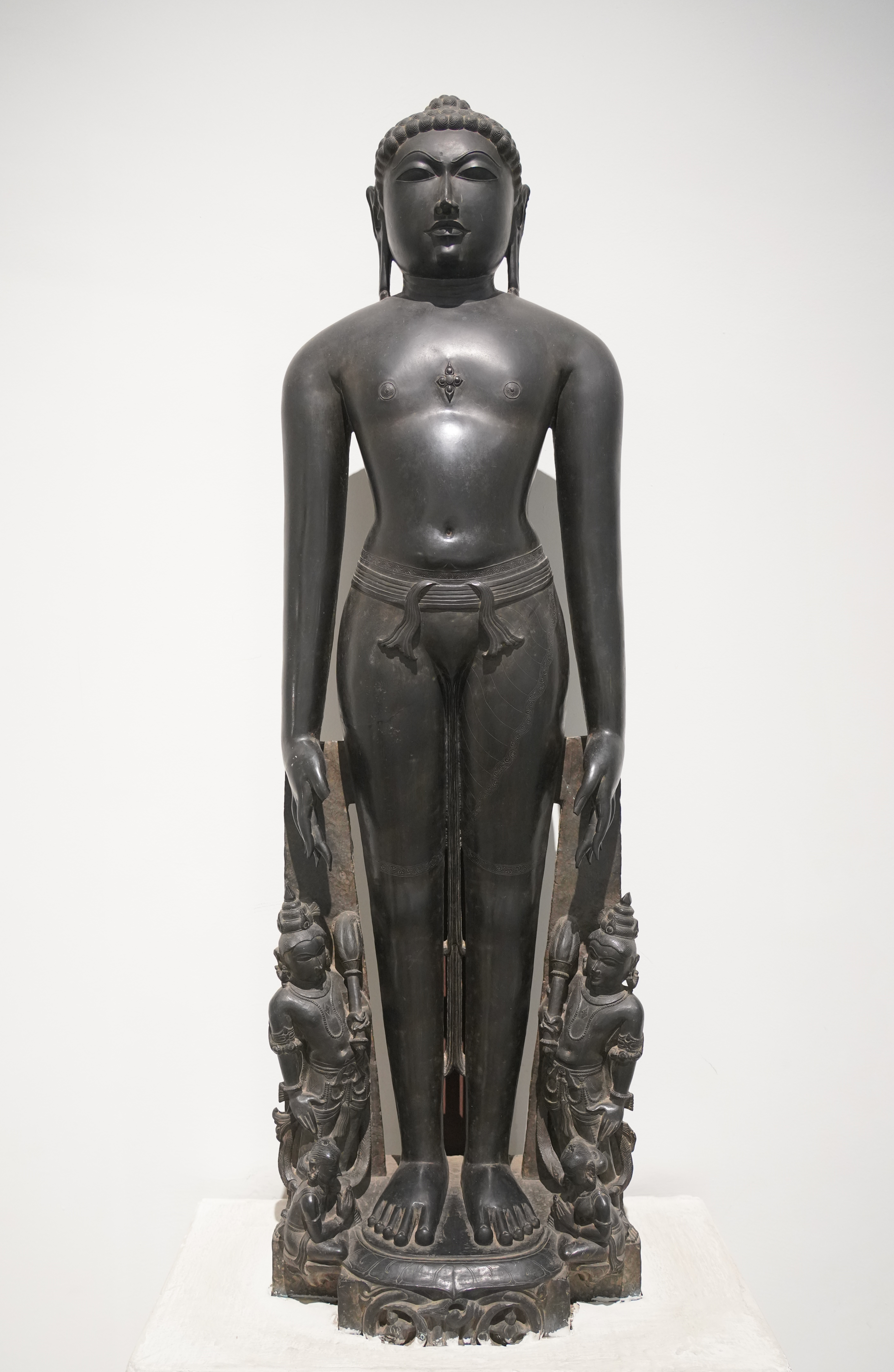
Tirthankara Neminatha Sculpture, National Museum, New Delhi, 11th Century

=== Worship and adoration ===
Neminatha is one of the five most devotionally revered tirthankaras, along with Mahavira, Rishabhanatha, Parshvanatha and Shantinatha. Scenes from Neminatha's life are popular in Jain art. Jinastotrāņi is a collection of hymn dedicated to Neminatha along with Munisuvrata, Chandraprabha, Shantinatha, Mahavira, Parshvanatha and Rishabhanatha.

Samantabhadra's Svayambhustotra praises the 24 tirthankaras, and its eight songs (shlokas) adore Shantinatha. One such shloka reads:

O Worshipful Lord! Endowed with supreme accomplishments, you had burnt the karmic fuel with the help of pure concentration; your eyes were broad as open water-lilies. You were the chief of the Hari dynasty and had promulgated the unblemished tradition of reverence, and control of the senses. You were an ocean of right conduct, and ageless. O Most Excellent Lord Ariṣṭanemi! After illuminating the world (the universe and the non-universe) through powerful ways of omniscience, you had attained liberation

— Svayambhūstotra (22-1-121)

=== Iconography ===
According to Jain texts, Neminatha is described as having a dark-blue or blackish complexion, mirroring his cousin Krishna. In Jain art, visual representations of his life consistently identify him with this dark skin color. His primary iconographic identifier (lanchhana) is the conch shell (shankha), which is typically carved on the pedestal of his idols. He is also frequently depicted alongside his associated guardian deities, the yaksha Gomedha and the yakshi Ambika.

Sometimes, as with Vishnu's iconography, a chakra is also shown near him, as in the 6th-century sculpture found at the archaeological site near Padhavali, Madhya Pradesh.

=== Ancient artifacts and idols ===
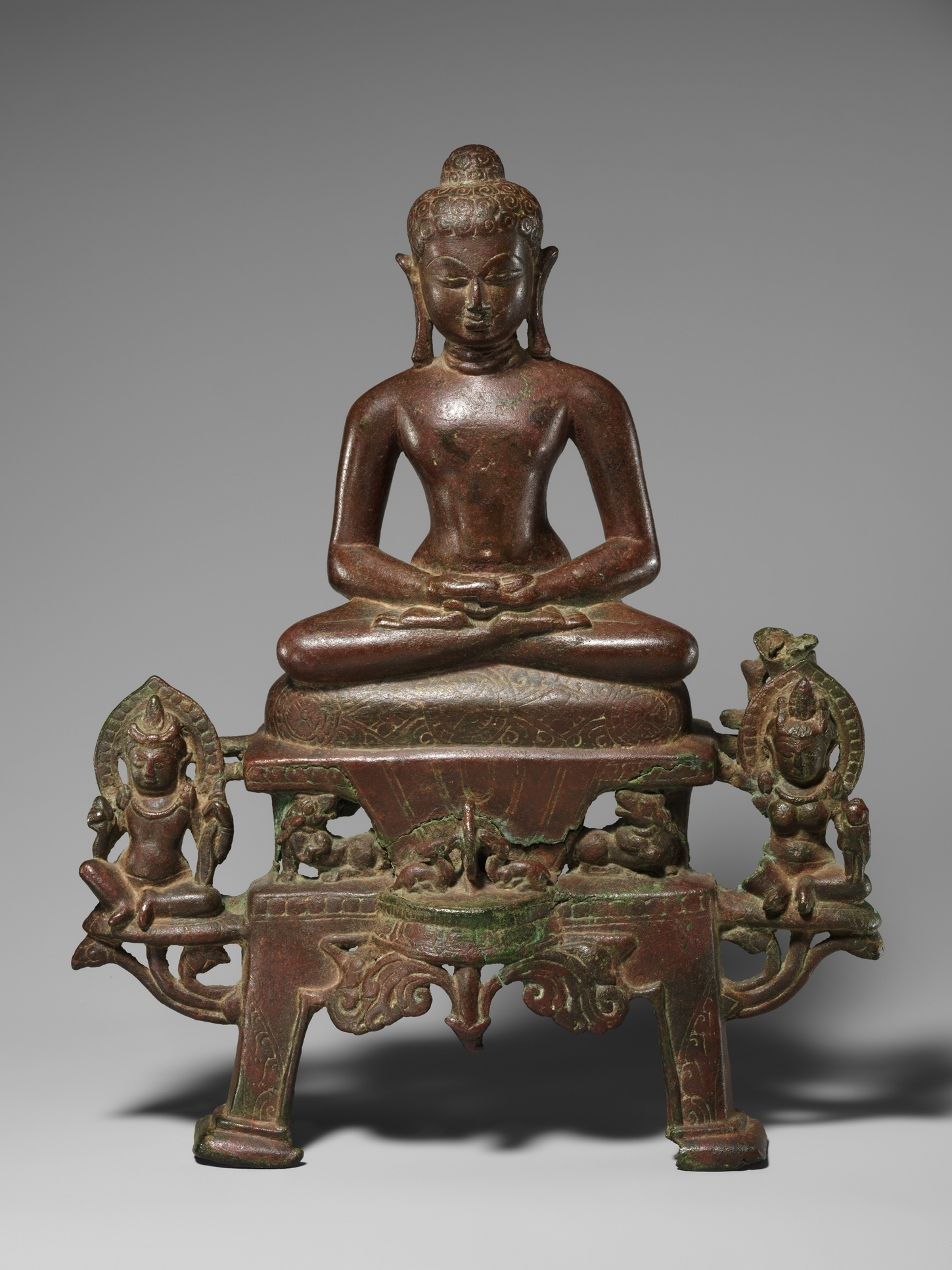
Neminatha idol from Akota Bronzes, MET museum, 7th century

The earliest known stone representations of Neminatha were excavated from Kankali Tila in Mathura. These artifacts, dating to the Kushan period (1st and 2nd centuries CE), establish the early veneration of the tirthankara. Further archaeological evidence was recovered from the Akota hoard in Gujarat. Documented by art historian Umakant Premanand Shah, the excavation yielded a 7th-century seated bronze idol of Neminatha. This well-preserved artifact represents the post-Gupta, Maitraka-era western Indian school of art, demonstrating the region's advanced metallurgical casting techniques during that period.

Further medieval artifacts associated with the Neminatha tradition were discovered in the Aluara hoard near Dhanbad, Jharkhand. Dating to the 11th century, this collection of Digambara bronzes is currently preserved at the Patna Museum. The hoard includes a notable bronze image of Ambika, the dedicated yakshi (guardian deity) of Neminatha. Documented by art historian Maruti Nandan Prasad Tiwari, the idol depicts the goddess in a tri-bhanga (triple-bent) posture alongside her two sons and a lion mount.

Another significant archaeological discovery is the Hansi hoard, excavated from the Asigarh Fort in Haryana. Dating to the 8th and 9th centuries CE, this collection of Jain bronzes includes an elaborate idol of Neminatha seated in the lotus posture. Documented by archaeologist Devendra Handa, the pedestal of this specific artifact is intricately detailed, featuring six miniature standing tirthankaras flanked by his guardian deities, Gomedha and Ambika.

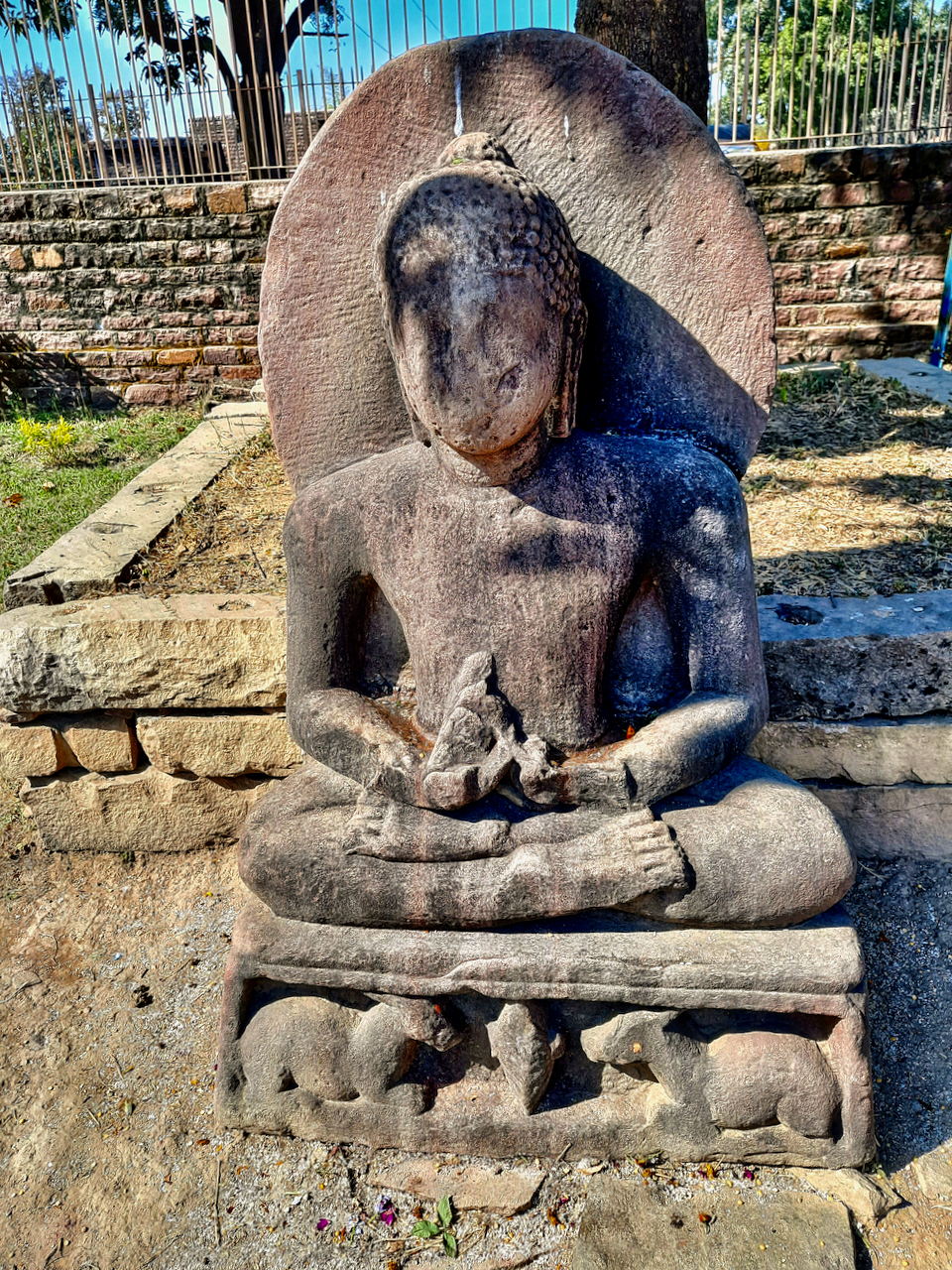
Neminatha Jain statue (c. 475 CE), in Buddha style from Shreyansh Giri, Madhya Pradesh

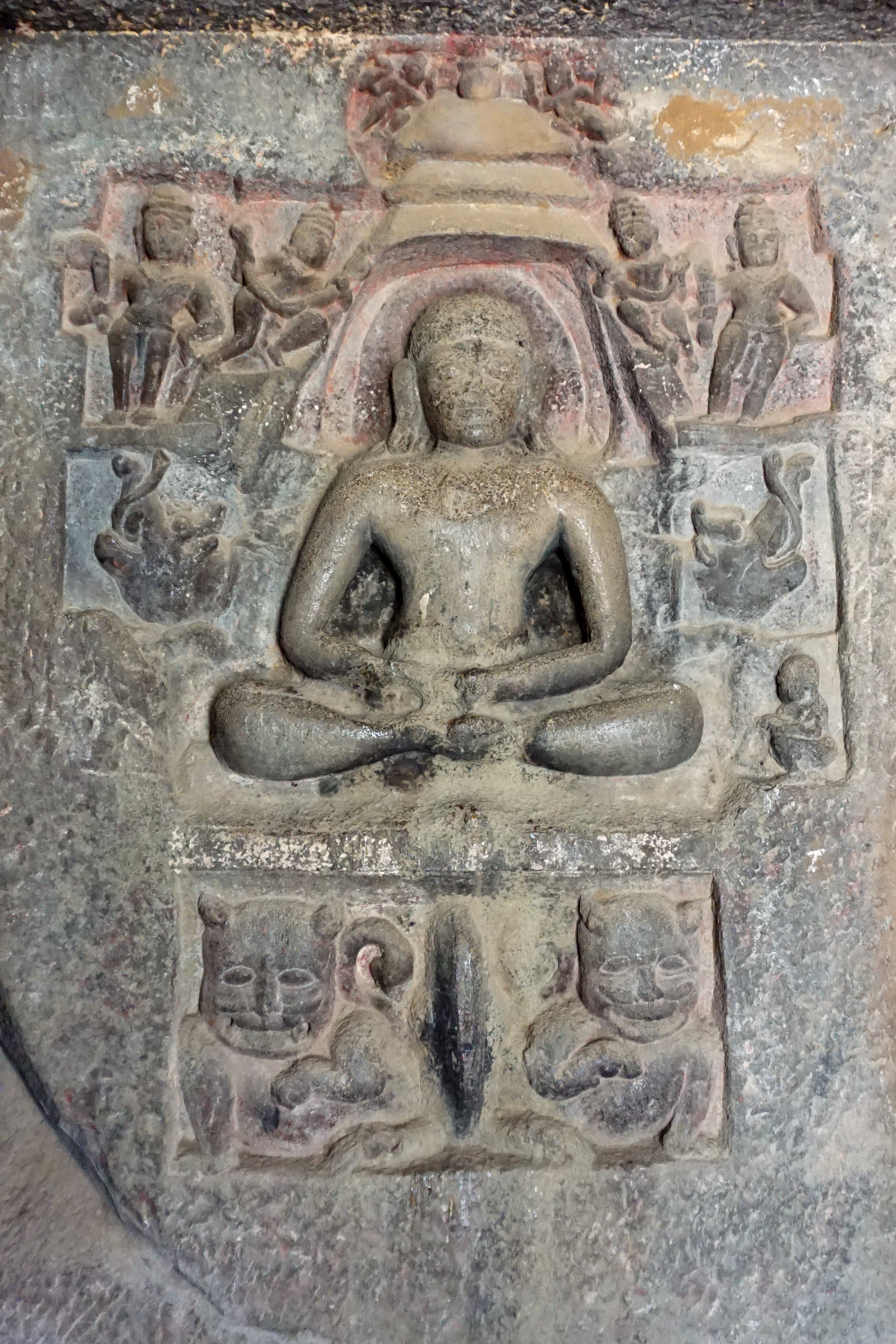
Neminatha, Nasik Caves, Maharashtra, 6th century

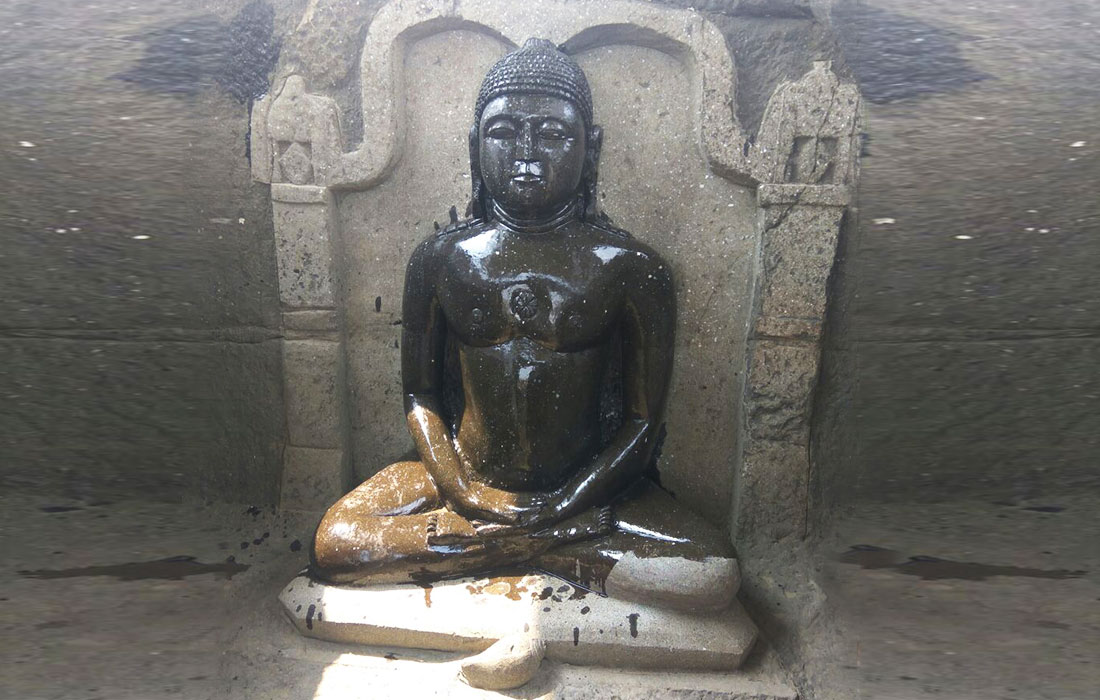
Pandavleni, Maharashtra

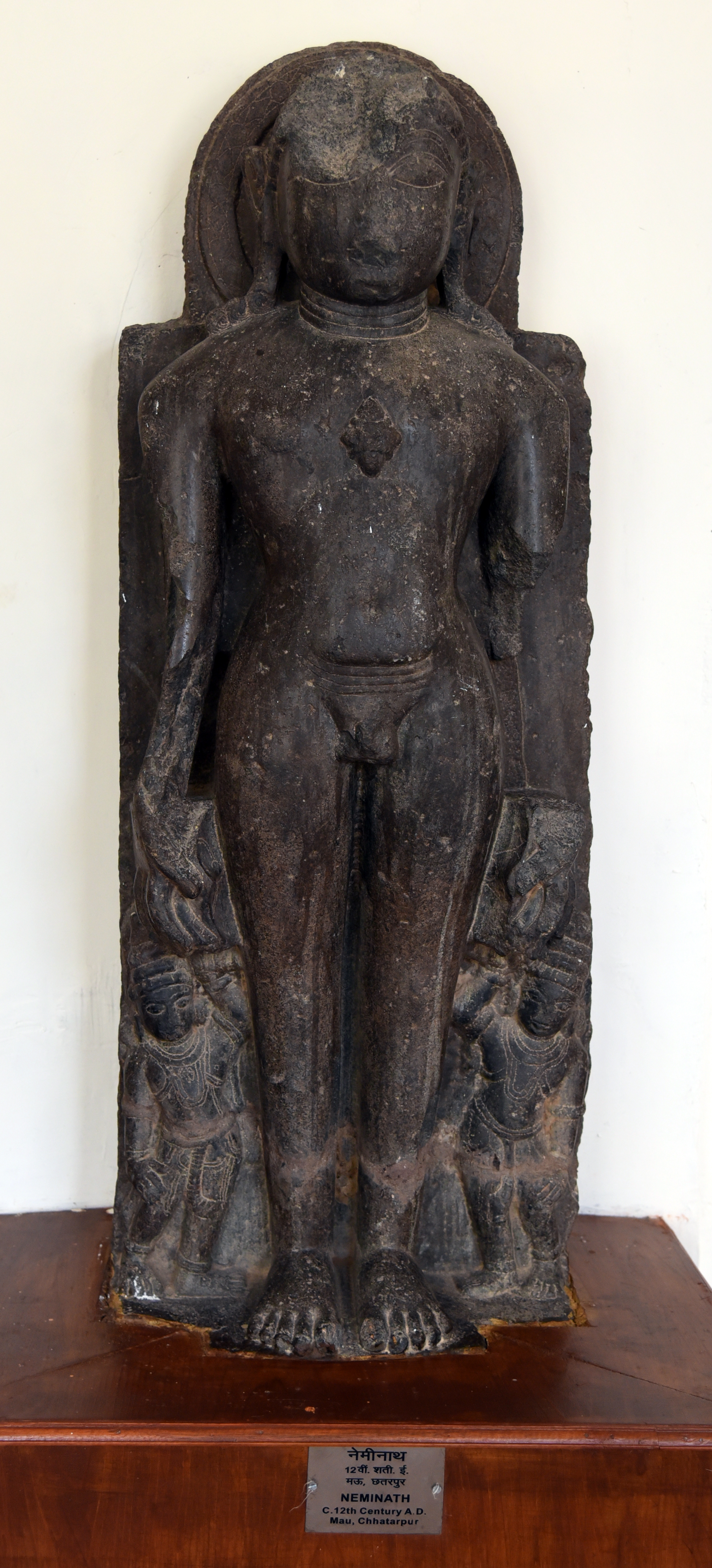
Image at Maharaja Chhatrasal Museum, Madhya Pradesh 12th century

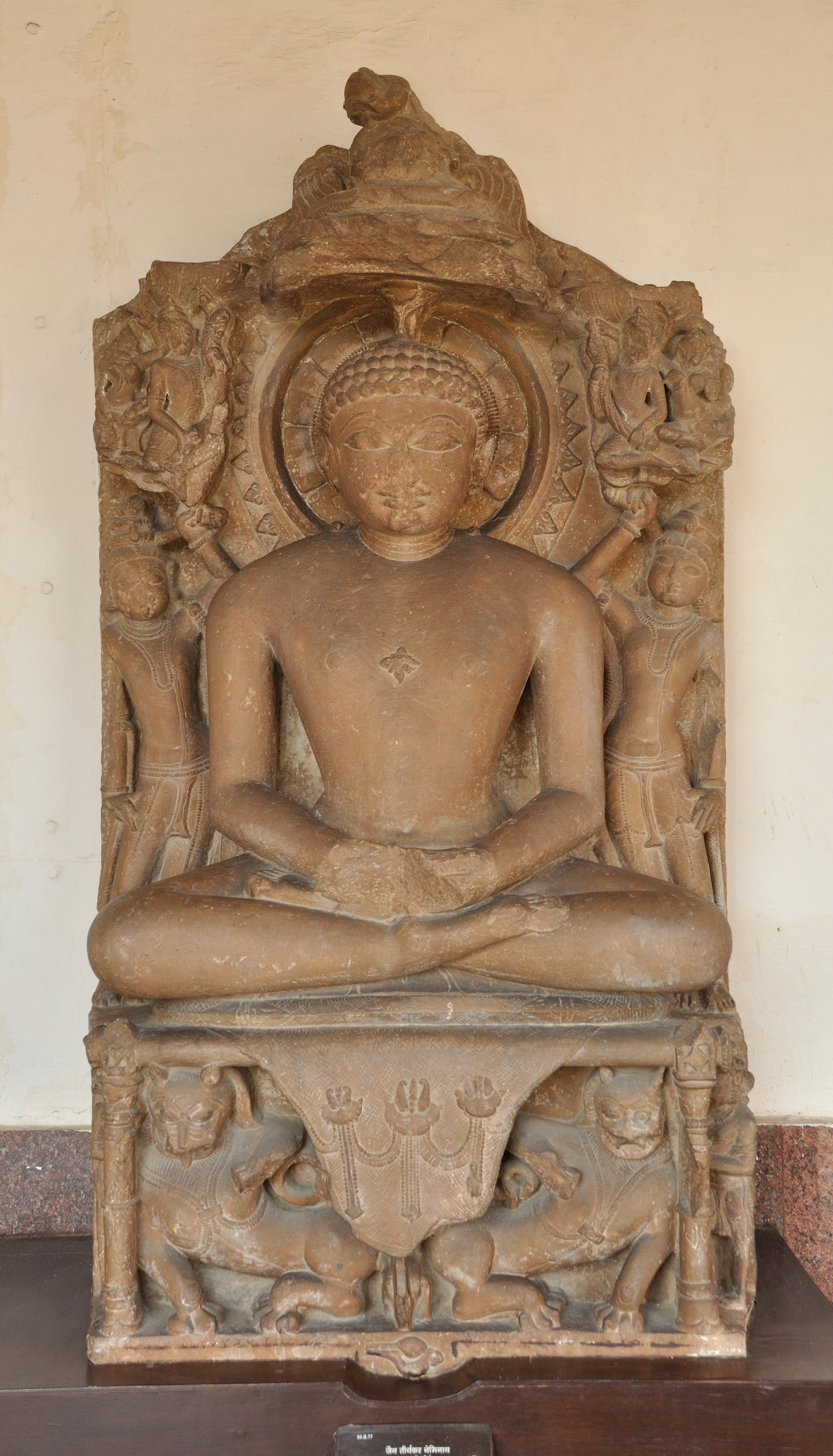
Neminath idol, Government Museum, Mathura, 12th Century

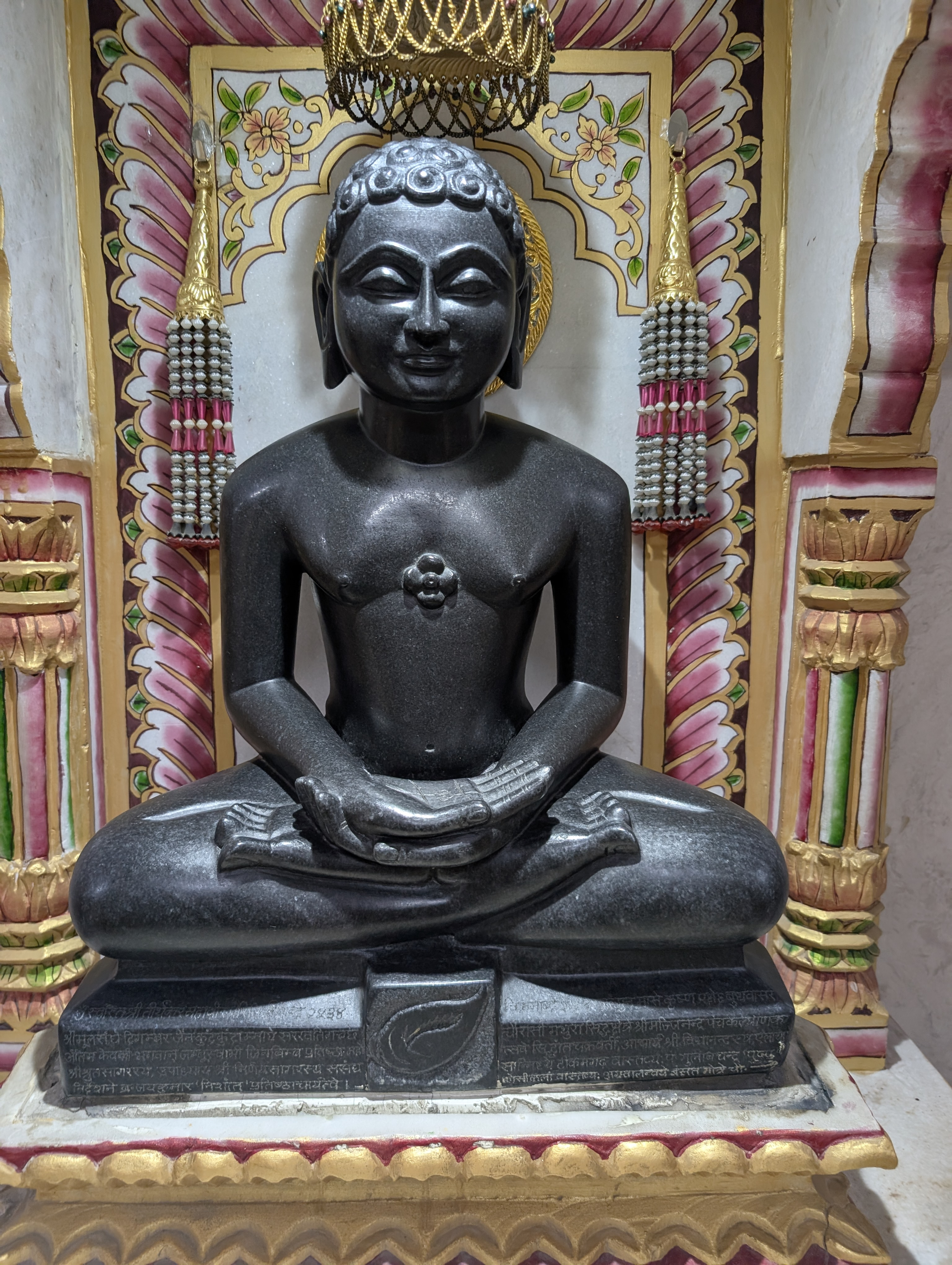

=== Guardian Deities ===
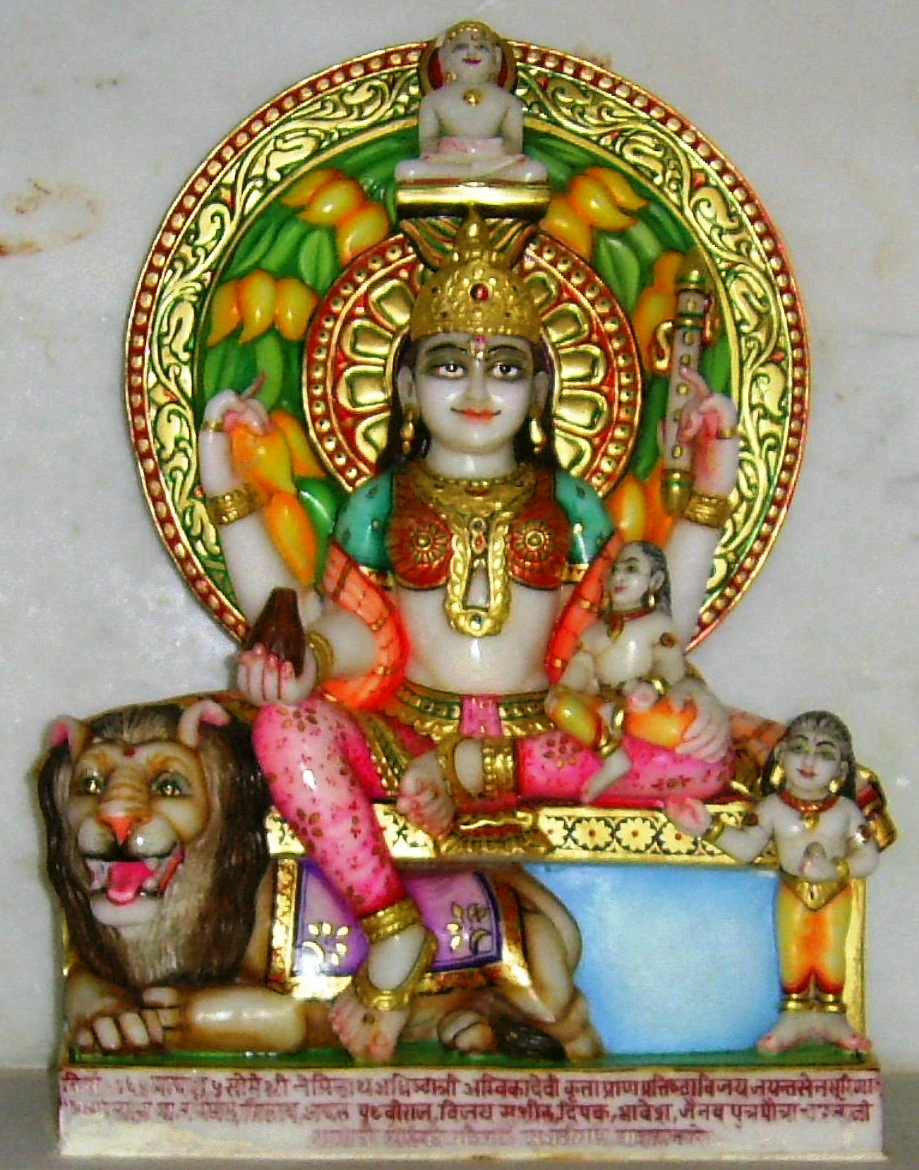
Ambika statue with Neminatha on top in Santhu, Rajasthan

In Jain art, tirthankaras are traditionally depicted with their dedicated guardian deities (Shashan-devatas). Neminatha is heavily associated with his attendant Yakshi, Ambika (also known as Kushmandini), who became one of the most prominent and independently worshipped goddesses in Jainism.

In standard canonical depictions alongside Neminatha, Ambika is shown seated under a mango tree (Kalpavriksha), riding a lion, and accompanied by her two sons. She often holds a bunch of mangoes or a mango branch, symbolizing fertility and abundance. While she is his subordinate guardian, artworks showing Neminatha frequently feature Ambika prominently, though her depicted skin color varies geographically from golden to greenish to dark-blue. A miniature carving of Neminatha in a seated meditative posture (dhyana mudra) is invariably placed at the very top of Ambika's independent sculptural frames to signify her devotion to him. According to the Digambara tradition, his accompanying male Yaksha is Sarvanha, while the Śvētāmbara tradition identifies him as Gomedha.

== See also ==
- God in Jainism
- Arihant (Jainism)
- List of Tirthankaras
