= List of tirthankaras =

Jain cosmology states that infinite tīrthaṅkaras (supreme preachers of the dharma) have existed since beginningless time, with more infinite tīrthaṅkaras yet to come. This article lists, in chronological order, the names, emblems, colors, etc. of the twenty-four tirthankaras in Jainism present in the current Avasarpini (cosmic half-time cycle).

S.No.	Tirthankara	Image	Heaven before birth	Birthplace; consecration	Parents	Complexion	Symbol	Height	Number of years lived	Tree	Attendant spirits	Male disciple; female disciple	Place of Nirvana	Birth
1	Rishabhanatha		Sarvarthasiddha	Ayodhya; Kailash	Nabhi by Marudevi	Golden	Bull	1,500 meters	592.704 quintillion years	Vata (Ficus benghalensis)	Gomukha and Chakreshvari	Pundarika; Brahmi	Ashtapaad	10^{224} years ago
2	Ajitanatha		Vijayavimana	Ayodhya; Shikharji	Jitashatru by Vijaya	Golden	Elephant	1,350 meters	508.032 quintillion years	Shala (Shorea robusta)	Mahayaksha and Ajitabala; or Rohini	Simhasena; Phalgu	Shikharji	5 × 10^{223} years ago
3	Sambhavanatha		Uvarimagraiveka	Shravasti; Shikharji	Jitari by Sena	Golden	Horse	1,200 meters	423.36 quintillion years	Prayala (Buchanania latifolia)	Trimukha and Duritari; or Prajnapti	Charu; Shyama	Shikharji	2 × 10^{223} years ago
4	Abhinandananatha		Jayantavimana	Ayodhya; Shikharji	Samvara by Siddhartha	Golden	Monkey	1,050 meters	352.8 quintillion years	Priyangu (Setaria italica, sometimes known as Panicum italicum)	Nayaka and Kalika; or Yaksheshvara and Vajrashrinkhala	Vajranabha; Ajita	Shikharji	10^{223} years ago
5	Sumatinatha		Jayantavimana	Ayodhya; Shikharji	Megharatha by Mangala	Golden	Goose	900 meters	282.24 quintillion years	Shala (Shorea robusta)	Tumburu and Mahakali; or Purushadatta	Charama; Kashyapi	Shikharji	10^{222} years ago
6	Padmaprabhu		Uvarimagraiveka	Kaushambi; Shikharji	Shridhara by Susima	Red	Lotus	750 meters	211.68 quintillion years	Chhatra	Kusuma and Shyama; or Manovega or Manogupti	Pradyotana; Rati	Shikharji	10^{221} years ago
7	Suparshvanatha		Madhyamagraiveka	Varanasi; Shikharji	Supratishtha by Prithvi	Golden	Swastika	600 meters	141.12 quintillion years	Shirisha (Albizia lebbeck)	Matanga and Shanta; or Varanandi and Kali	Vidarbha; Soma	Shikharji	10^{220} years ago
8	Chandraprabhu		Vijayantadevaloka	Chandrawati or Chandrapura; Sammed Shikharji	Mahasena by Lakshmana	White	Crescent Moon	450 meters	70.56 quintillion years	Naga	Vijaya and Bhrikuti; or Shyama or Vijaya and Jvalamalini	Dinna; Sumana	Shikharji	10^{219} years ago
9	Suvidhinatha/Pushpadanta		Anatadevaloka	Kakandi; Shikharji	Sugriva by Rama	White	Crocodile	300 meters	14.112 quintillion years	Shala (Shorea robusta)	Ajita and Sutaraka; or Mahakali	Varahaka; Varuni	Shikharji	10^{218} years ago
10	Shitalanatha		Achyutadevaloka	Bhaddilpur; Shikharji	Dridharatha by Nanda	Golden	Kalpavriksha	270 meters	7.056 quintillion years	Priyangu (Setaria italica, a.k.a. Panicum italicum)	Brahma and Ashoka; or Manavi	Nanda; Suyasha	Shikharji	10^{217} years ago
11	Shreyansanatha		Achyutadevaloka	Simhapuri; Shikharji	Vishnuraja by Vishnu	Golden	Rhinoceros	240 meters	8.4 million years	Tanduka	Yaksheta and Manavi; or Ishvara and Gauri	Kashyapa; Dharani	Shikharji	10^{212} years ago
12	Vasupujya		Pranatadevaloka	Champapuri; Champapuri	Vasupujya by Jaya	Red	Buffalo	210 meters	7.2 million years	Patala (Bignonia suaveolens)	Kumara and Chandra; or Gandhari	Subhuma; Dharani	Champapuri	4 × 10^{211} years ago
13	Vimalanatha		Mahasaradevaloka	Kampilyapura; Shikharji	Kritavarma by Shyama	Golden	Boar	180 meters	6 million years	Jambu (Eugenia jambolana)	Shanmukha and Vidita; or Vairoti)	Mandara; Dhara	Shikharji	1.6 × 10^{211} years ago
14	Anantanatha		Pranatadevaloka	Ayodhya; Shikharji	Simhasena by Suyasha	Golden	Porcupine	150 meters	3 million years	Ashoka (Saraca asoca)	Patala and Ankusha; or Anantamati	Yasha; Padma	Shikharji	7 × 10^{210} years ago
15	Dharmanatha		Vijayavimana	Ratnapuri; Shikharji	Bhanu by Suvrata	Golden	Vajra	135 meters	1 million years	Dadhiparna (Clitoria ternatea)	Kinnara and Kandarpa; or Manasi	Arishta; Arthashiva	Sammed Shikharji	3 × 10^{210} years ago
16	Shantinatha		Sarvarthasiddha	Gajapura or Hastinapuri; Shikharji	Vishvasena by Achira	Golden	Deer	120 meters	100,000 years	Nandi (Cedrela toona)	Garuda and Nirvani; or Kimpurusha and Mahamanasi	Chakrayuddha; Shuchi	Shikharji	10^{194} years ago
17	Kunthunatha		Sarvarthasiddha	Gajapura or Hastinapuri; Shikharji	Suraraja by Shridevi	Golden	Goat	105 meters	95,000 years	Vata (Ficus benghalensis)	Gandharva and Bala; or Vijaya	Samba; Damini	Sammed Shikharji	10^{194} years ago
18	Aranatha		Sarvarthasiddha	Gajapura or Hastinapuri; Shikharji	Sudarshana by Devi	Golden	Fish	90 meters	84,000 years	Amba (Mangifera indica)	Yaksheta and Dhana; or Kendra and Ajita	Kumbha; Rakshita	Shikharji	16,585,000 BCE
19	Mallinatha		Jayantadevaloka	Mithila; Shikharji	Kumbharaja by Prabhavati	Blue	Kalasha	75 meters	55,000 years	Ashoka (Saraca asoca)	Kubera and Dharanapriya; or Aparajita	Abhikshaka; Bandhumati	Shikharji	6,584,980 BCE
20	Munisuvrata		Aparajitadevaloka	Rajagriha; Shikharji	Sumitraraja by Padmavati	Black	Tortoise	60 meters	30,000 years	Champaka (Magnolia champaca)	Varuna and Naradatta; or Bahurupini	Malli; Pushpavati	Shikharji	1,184,980 BCE
21	Naminatha		Pranatadevaloka	Mithila; Sammed Shikharji	Vijayaraja by Vapra	Golden	Blue Water Lily	45 meters	10,000 years	Bakula (Mimusops elengi)	Bhrikuti and Gandhari; or Chamundi	Shubha; Anila	Shikharji	584,979 BCE
22	Neminatha		Aparajitadevaloka	Sauripura; Girnar	Samudravijaya by Shivadevi	Black	Shankha	30 meters	1,000 years	Vetasa (Salix caprea Linn)	Gomedha and Ambika; or Sarvahna and Kushmandini	Varadatta; Yakshadinna	Girnar	84,000 years ago
23	Parshvanatha		Pranatadevaloka	Varanasi; Sammed Shikharji	Ashvasena by Vamadevi	Green	Snake	13.5 feet	100 years	Dhataki (Woodfordia fruticosa)	Parshvayaksha or Dharanendra and Padmavati	Aryadinna; Pushpachuda	Shikharji	872 BCE
24	Mahavira		Pranatadevaloka	Kshatriyakund; Pavapuri	Siddhartharaja and Trishala	Golden	Lion	6 feet	72 years	Teak (Tectona grandis)	Matanga and Siddhayika	Indrabhuti; Chandanabala	Pavapuri	599 BCE

The total length of the lifespans of all 24 Tīrthaṅkaras combined equals 2.603672 sextillion years.
