= Jain temples, Abhapur =

Śvetāmbara Jain temples in Gujarat, India

Abhapur Jain temples
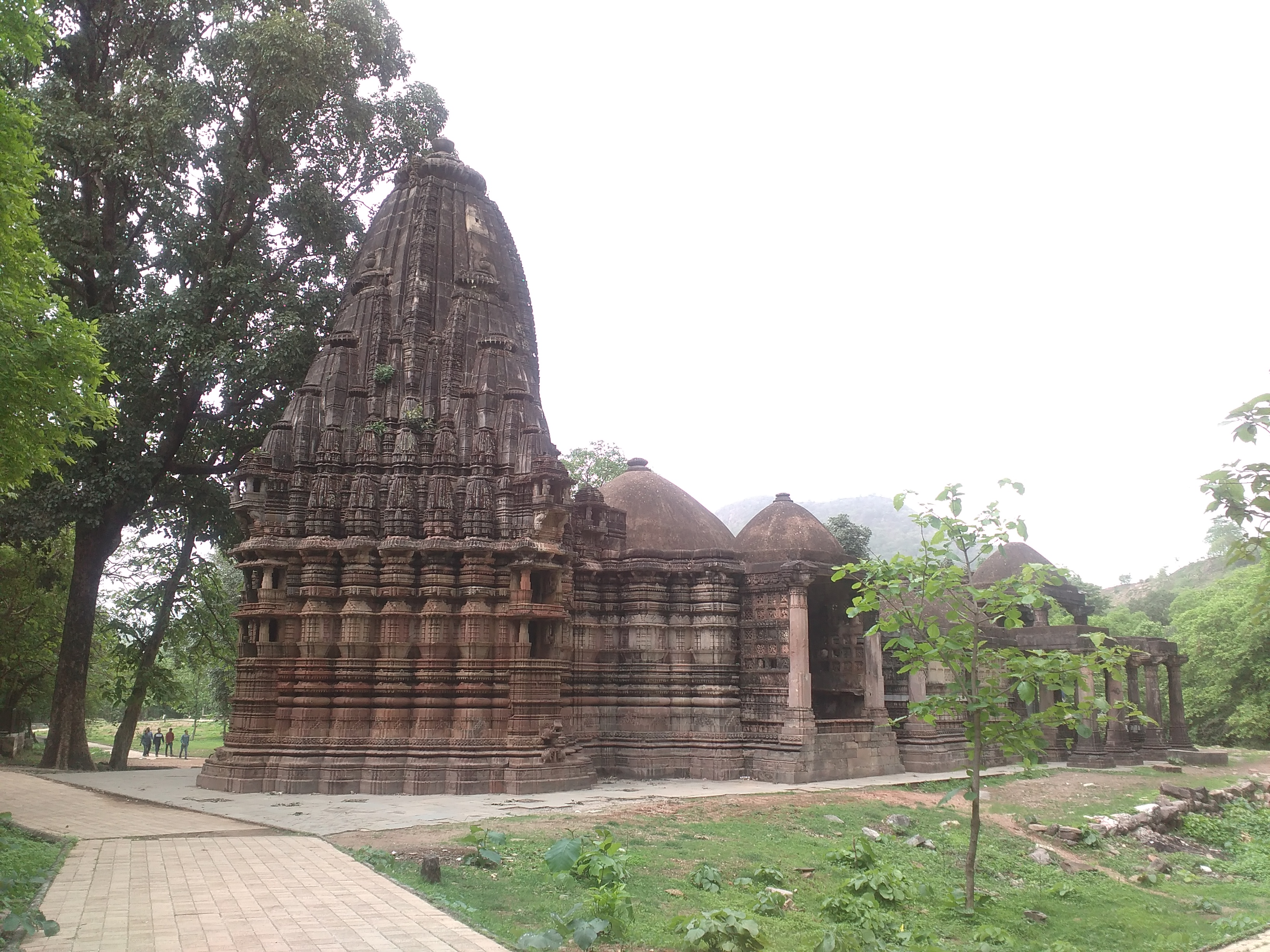
- Abhapur Jain temple

Religion
- Affiliation: Jainism
- Sect: Śvetāmbara
- Deity: Rishabhanatha, Parshvanatha, Neminatha
- Festival: Mahavir Jayanti

Location
- Location: Abhapur, Polo Forest, Sabarkantha, Gujarat, India
- Interactive map of Abhapur Jain temples
- Coordinates: 23°59′18.7″N 73°16′14.1″E

Architecture
- Established: 15th century
- Temple: 12

Jain temples, Abhapur is a group of twelve Śvetāmbara Jain temples located in Abhapur village near Polo Forest in Sabarkantha district of Gujarat, India.

== History ==
Abhapur Jain temples were constructed in the 15th century. The Jain and Hindu temples in close proximity at Abhapur, Polo and Antarsurbha site suggests the co-existence both Jainism and Hinduism during medieval period. All 12 temples belong to the Śvetāmbara sect of Jainism.

== Architecture ==
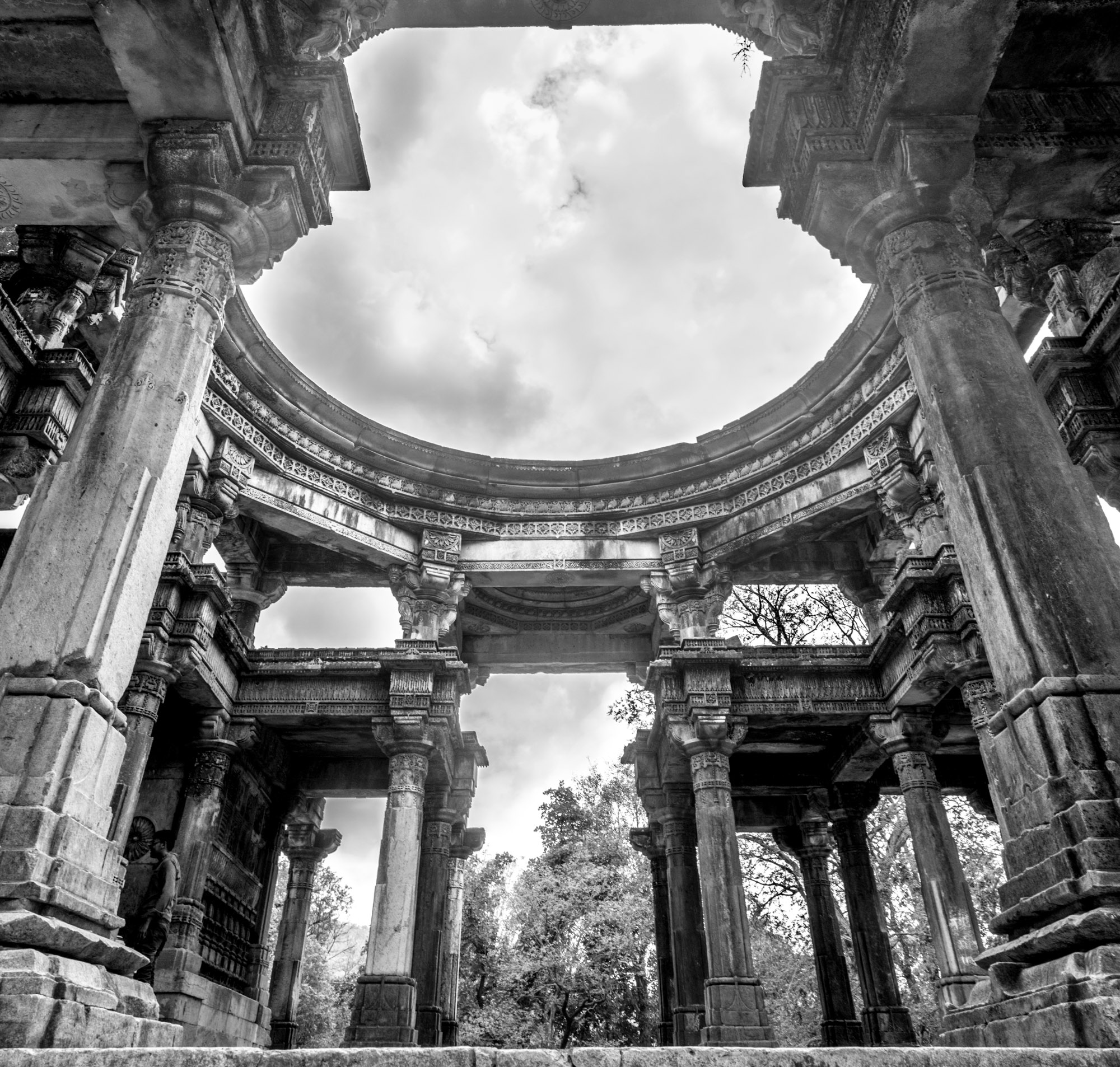
The ruined Jain temple with open ceiling

Both Jain and Hindu temples are in ruins status and has turned black due to exposure to the sun and rain.

=== Lakhena Jain temple ===
The Lakhena Jain temple or Lakhena na Dera is the largest temple in Abhapur. The temple is rich in architecture with exquisite sculptures of apsara. The temple also has a well in the premise. The lower level chamber where idols were concealed in the past. The temple is made of sandstone with well carved ceiling and jalis in the mandapa having various natural and geometric patterns. Only the arch remains where a main dome exited in the past. The temple is two storeyed with gudhamandapa and antarala. The antarala ceiling has a beautiful sculpture. The temple has beautifully executed screens, swan panels, and other carvings and the richly carved pillars have carvings comparable to the Dilwara Temples. The doors in the garbhagriha has carving similar to that of wooden door. The mulnayak of the temple is an image of Jain Tirthankara Parshvanatha with Goddess Padmavati on the sides. The temple is 150 by 70 feet (46 by 21 m) in area. The temple was formerly surrounded by 52 devkulika shrines.

Behind the Lakhena na dera is a small temple with exposed ceiling. The temple has a well in the premises.

=== Other Jain temples ===
The second temple is built in bricks and marble, it was a tri-angi (tri-element) temple having sanctum, antarala and mandapa which can be identified from its surviving plinth. It also has Parshwanatha on its lintel of the doorframe of the sanctum. Adorned with Kirtimukha motifs, the threshold has images of Kubera on its both ends.

The third Jain temple has similar tri-angi to temple 2 with more ornamentation carvings. Built in bricks and sandstone, this Nagara style temple has Indra as a guardian in the surviving doorframe of the mandapa. On its exterior walls, it has images of Chakreshwari, Padmavati and Ambika associated with Jain Tirthankara Rishabhanatha, Parshwanatha and Neminatha respectively. It also has niches without images.

== Gallery ==
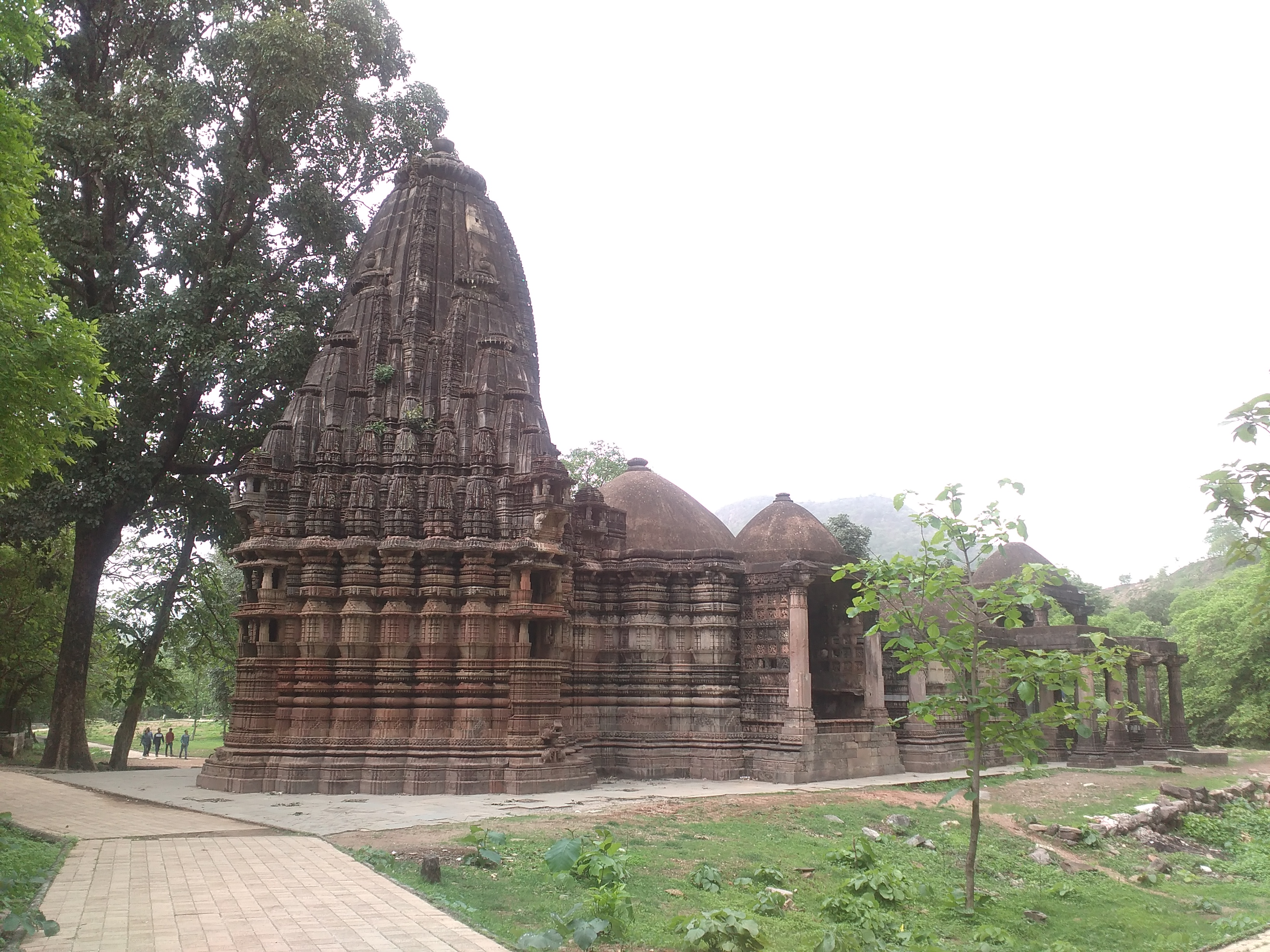
Lakhena temple

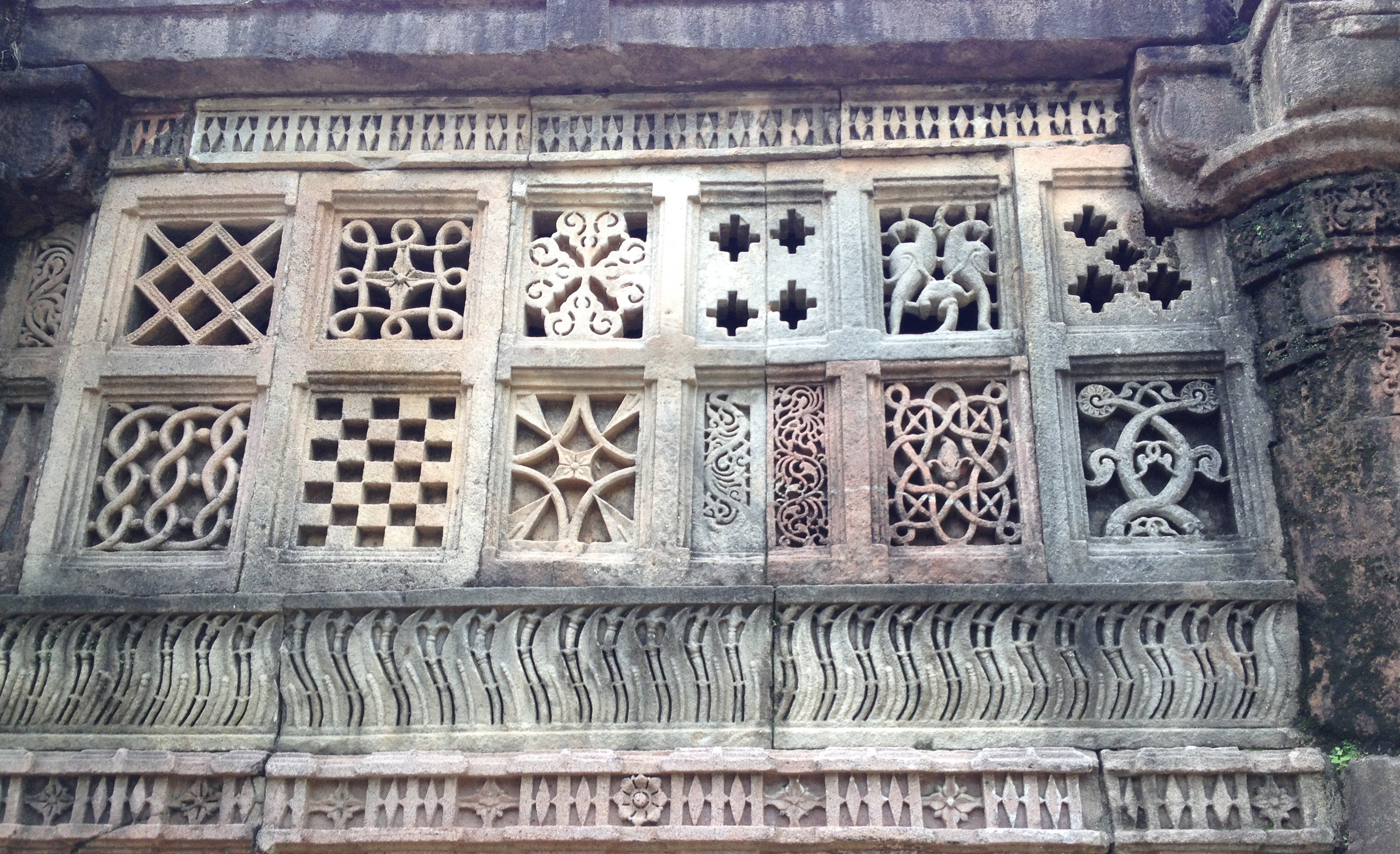
Jali in Lakhena temple

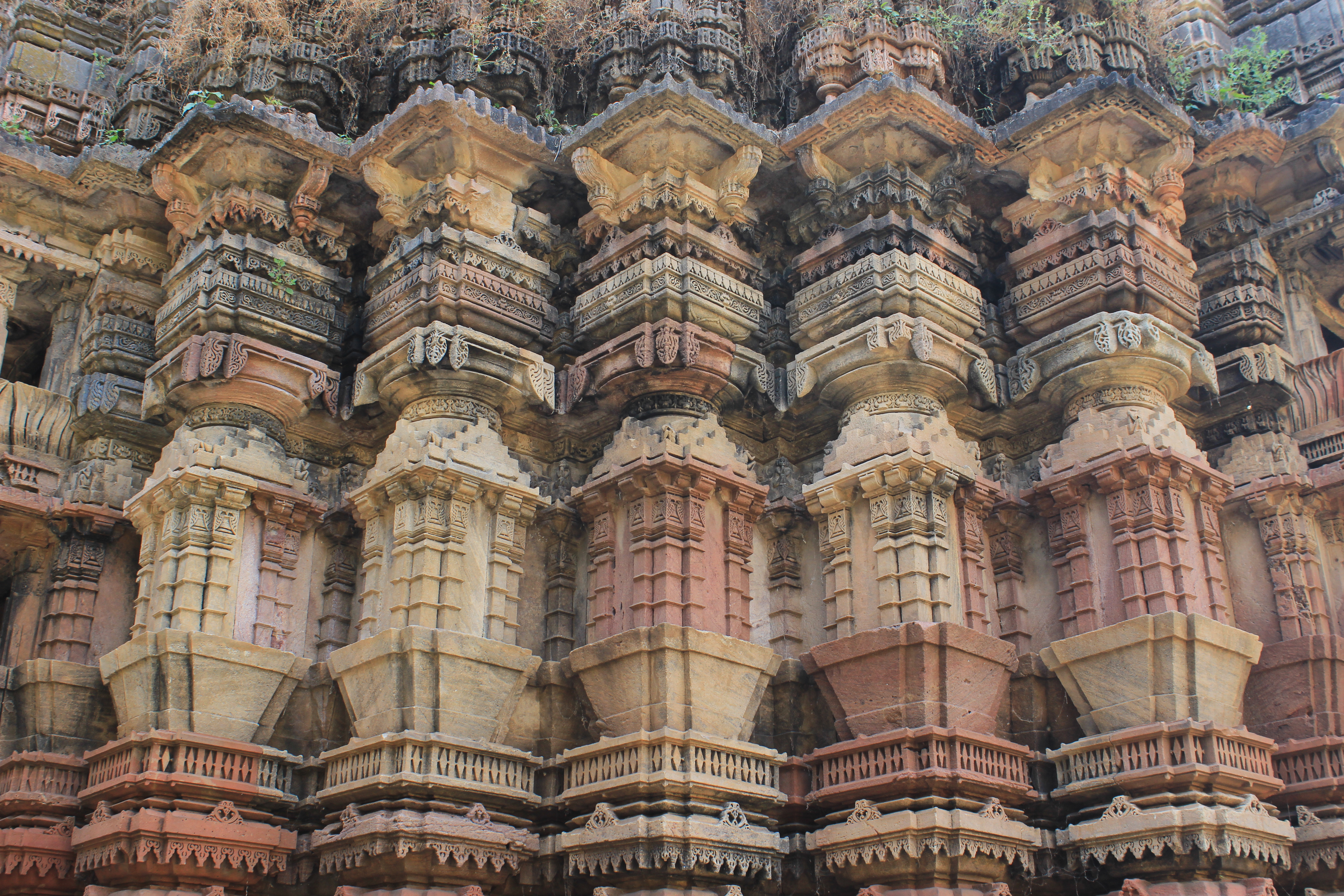
Outer wall of Lakhena temple

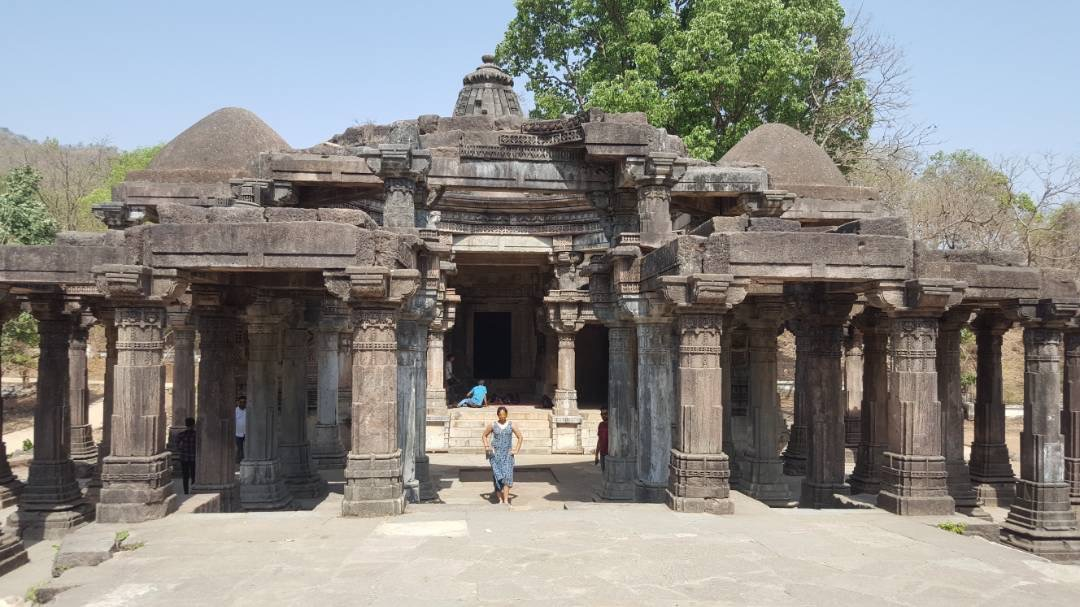
Jain temple

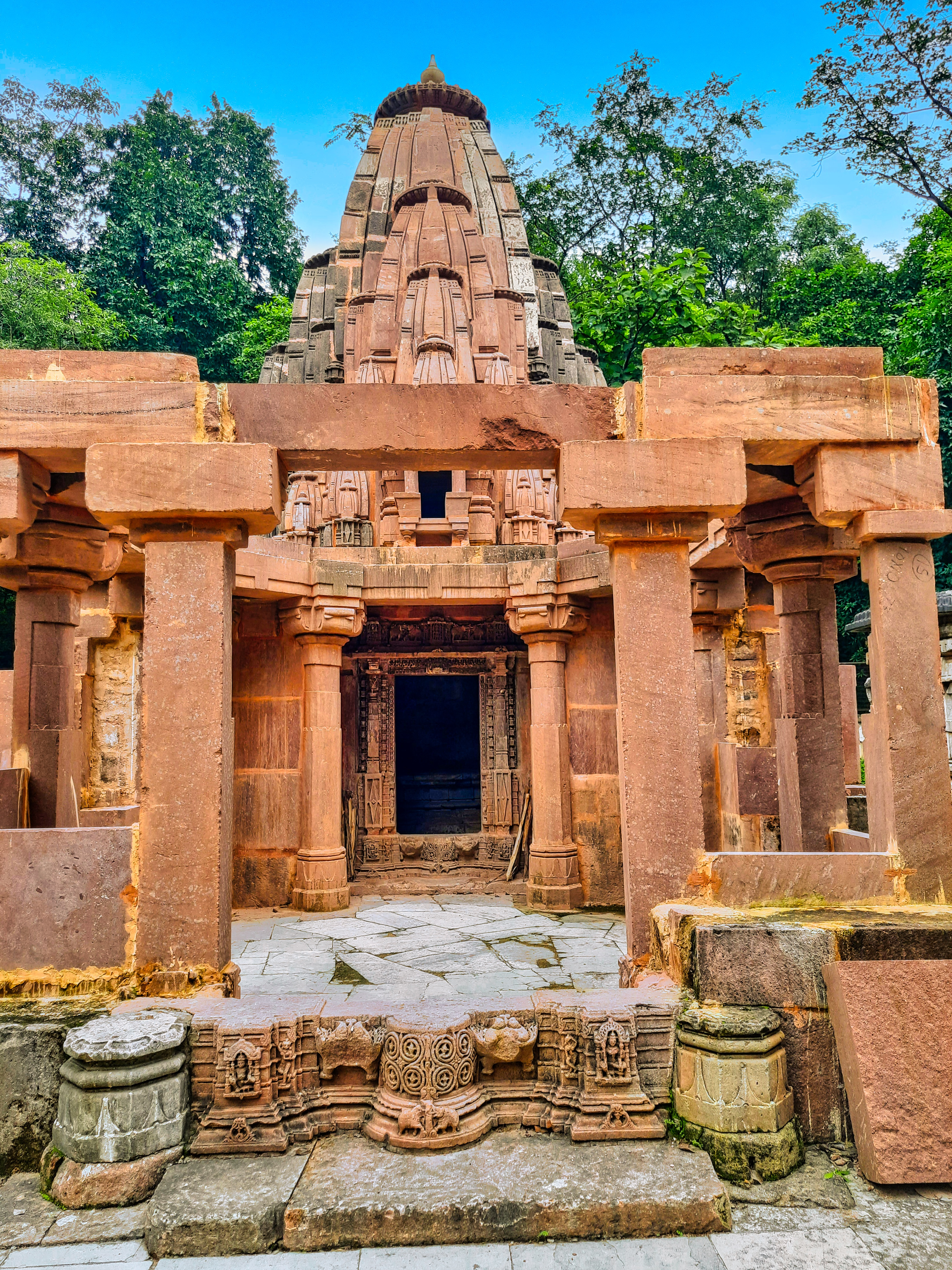
Jain temple
