= Samudravijaya =

Jain king

Genealogy
- Parents: Andhakavṛṣṭī (father); Bhadrā (mother)
- Spouse: Śivādevī
- Children: Ariṣṭanemi

Samudravijaya was the father of Neminatha (twenty-second Tirthankara) and brother of Vasudeva (father of Krishna). He was born to King Andhakavṛṣṭī of Harivamsa dynasty in Śaurīpura where he later ruled as a king. He married princess Shivadevi.

== Literature ==
The Harivamsa Purana of Acharya Jinasena throws some light on the life of Samudravijaya.
