= Natubhai Shah =

- Born: 1932; Gujarat, India
- Died: (1932 – 6 March 2022)

Natubhai Keshavlal Shah (1932 – 6 March 2022) was a medical doctor, author, and community leader who represented the Jain community in the United Kingdom. Born in Mahmadpur, Gujarat, he completed his early education in Palanpur and studied science at Fergusson College. With the support of Mahavira Jaina Vidyalaya, he subsequently earned a medical degree from the University of Mumbai. In 1968, Shah relocated to Leicester, England, where he practiced as a general practitioner until his retirement in 1997.

Throughout his life, Shah was deeply involved in organizing the UK Jain community, establishing the Leicester Jain Centre in 1988 as a central place of worship. Following his retirement from medicine, he earned a PhD in the Jain religion and became the founding CEO of the Jain Network. He authored the two-volume book Jainism: The World of Conquerors and spearheaded the establishment of Jain studies at De Montfort University, SOAS University of London, the University of Antwerp, and Mumbai University. In his later years, he also led the development of a purpose-built Jain Centre in Colindale, North London.

Shah was highly active in interfaith dialogue, serving as a founding member of the Faiths Forum for London and as a trustee for the Inter Faith Network UK. In recognition of his extensive community and interfaith services, he was appointed a Member of the Order of the British Empire (MBE) in 2012.

He was previously awarded the "Jain Ratna" by Indian Prime Minister Atal Bihari Vajpayee in 2001 and was named "Man of the Year" by the American Biographical Institute in 1991. Shah died on 6 March 2022, following a heart attack.
