= Jyotiprasad Jain =

Jyoti Prasad Jain (1912–1988) was an Indian historian, author, and scholar specializing in Jain history, philosophy, and literature.

== Early life and career ==
Jain was born on 6 February 1912 in Meerut, Uttar Pradesh. He completed his higher education at Meerut College and Agra College, earning multiple Master of Arts degrees in history, Political Science, and English Literature, alongside a Bachelor of Laws (LL.B.) and a doctorate (Ph.D.). During his professional career, he served as a Compilation Officer and Sub-Editor for the Department of District Gazetteers under the Government of Uttar Pradesh. He formally retired from his governmental administrative position in December 1972.

== Scholarly contributions and works ==
Throughout his lifetime, Jain authored numerous academic books, tracts, and articles focusing on Indology and Jainism in both English and Hindi. His prominent English-language publications include Jainism: The Oldest Living Religion, The Jaina Sources of the History of Ancient India, and Religion and Culture of the Jains. His Hindi-language historical works include Bhāratiya Itihas: Ek Dristi, Pramukh Atihasik Jain Purush Aur Mahilayen, and Jain Jyoti: Aitihasik Vyaktikos. In addition to his authored texts, he served as an editor for academic and religious journals, including Jain Antiquary and Jain Siddhant Bhaskar, and acted as the general editor for the Murti Devi Granthamala series. In recognition of his scholarly contributions to history, he was awarded the title of "Itihasa Ratna" in Bhopal in 1958, and was later conferred the "Vidya Varidhi" title by Vir Nirwan Bharati in 1974.
