= Harisatya Bhattacharya =

Harisatya Bhattacharya was a 20th-century Indian scholar, historian, and author specializing in Jain philosophy, metaphysics, and ethics. He researched and documented the philosophical intersections between Jain doctrines and broader Indian spiritual traditions.

== Scholarly contributions and works ==
Bhattacharya authored several academic books in English focusing on Jain epistemology and moral doctrine. His prominent publications include The Philosophy of Jainas (1958) and Reals in the Jaina Metaphysics (1966). He also published Jain Moral Doctrine in 1976, which explores the ethical frameworks and vows within the Jain tradition. In comparative Indian philosophy, his historical research analyzed the foundational influence of Jain doctrines on the spiritual development of the Yadava tradition. His academic writings highlight how the Jain Five Vows mirror ethical virtues found in ancient texts, serving as a basis for early theological alignments.
