= Śaurīpura =

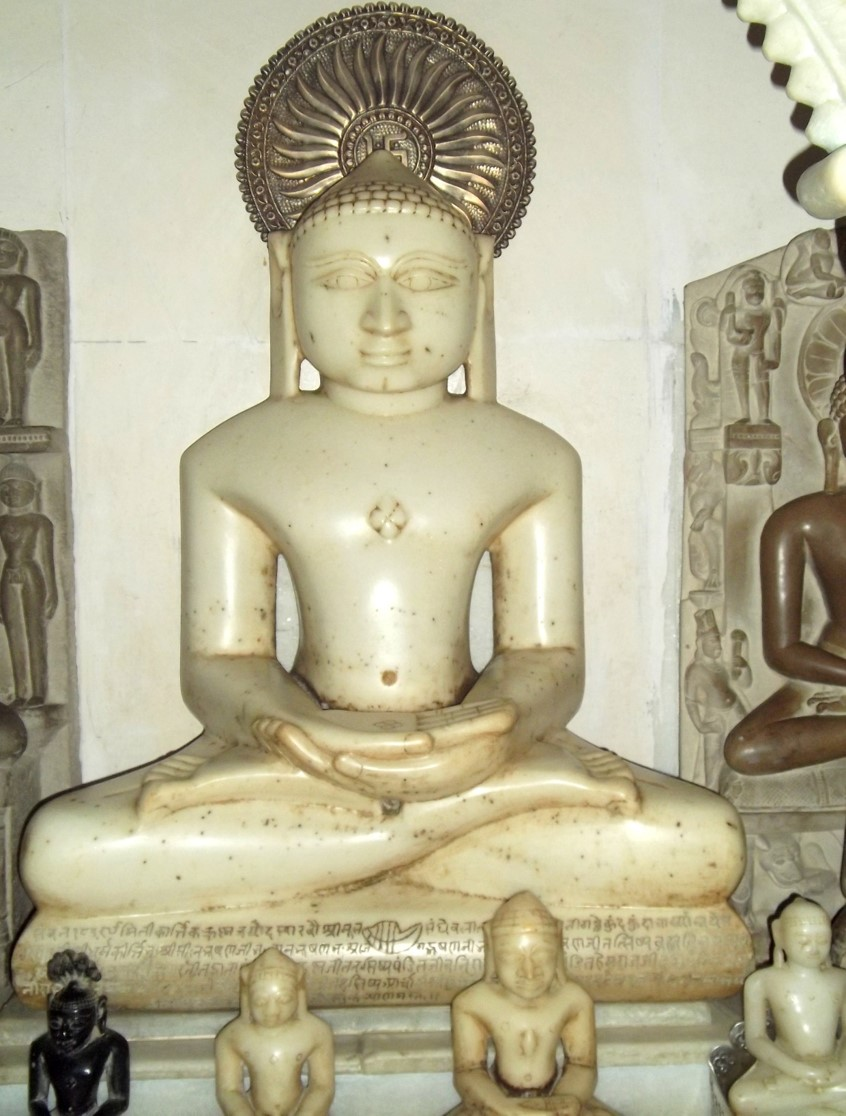
- The idol of Tirthankara Neminatha in Bateshwar Jinalaya
- Interactive map of Śaurīpura
- 26°56′51″N 78°32′19″E
- Location: Uttar Pradesh

Śaurīpura - is situated at a distance of 75 km from Agra, 25 km from Shikohabad and 1.5 km on hilly road from Bateshvara on the banks of Yamuna river in Uttar Pradesh.

== In Jainism ==
It was the city where Jain Tirthankara Neminatha was born. There are several Jinalayas here.
