= Vitalism (Jainism) =

Aspect of Jain philosophy

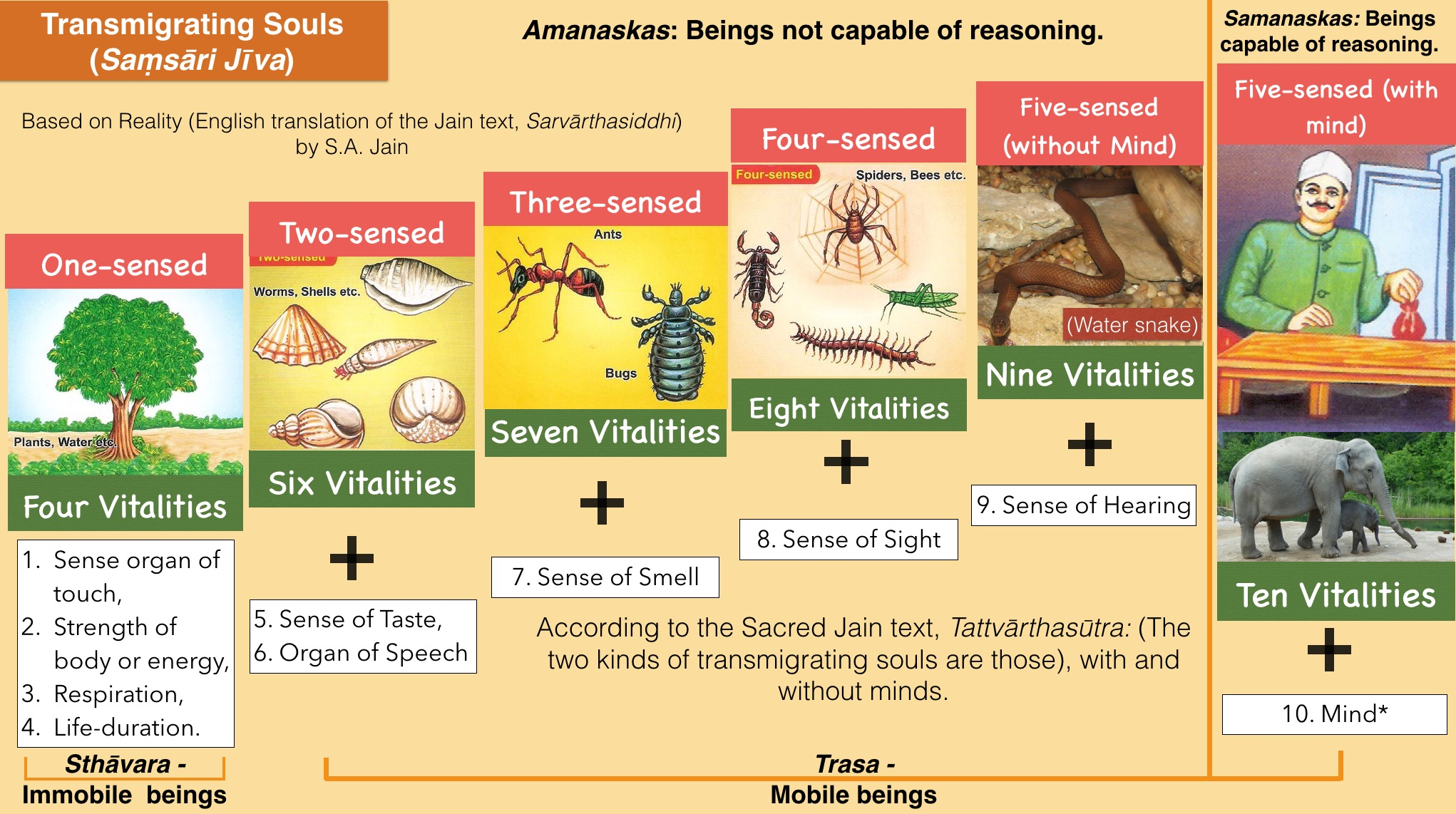
Classification of Saṃsāri Jīvas (Transmigrating Souls) in Jainism.

Vitalism is at the core of Jain philosophy which separates Jiva (soul or life) from Ajiva (non-soul). According to Jain cosmology, the whole universe is made up of six simple substances and is therefore eternal. These six substances (dravya) are:

- Jiva
- Time
- Space
- Dharma (medium of motion)
- Adharma
- Matter (Pudgala)

Jiva or soul is distinguished from the rest five (termed Ajiva) on account of the quality of intelligence with which it is endowed and of which the other substances are devoid.

The Tattvarthsutra by Umaswati states that the universe is made up of six eternal substances: sentient beings or souls (jīva), non-sentient substance or matter (pudgala), principle of motion (dharma), the principle of rest (adharma), space (ākāśa) and time (kāla). The Sarvārthasiddhi by Pujyapada further divides the Jiva into the amount of vitalities of the sense possessed.

According to Sacred Jain text, Sarvārthasiddhi: "Immobile beings (sthāvara jīvās) possess the four vitalities of the sense-organ of touch, strength of body or energy, respiration and life-duration.

== Overview ==
According to Jainism, there are ten vitalities or life-principles:

- The five senses (touch, taste, smell, sight, hearing)
- Energy
- Respiration
- Life-duration
- The organ of speech
- The mind

According to major Jain text, Tattvarthsutra: "The severance of vitalities out of passion is injury". Because life is to be considered sacred and in every living thing, Jains avoid killing any living creature. They are not only vegetarian, but decline to eat vegetables that grow under the ground because each underground stem contains infinite number of vitalities each of that can potentially grow into full-fledged plants. The table below summarizes the vitalities that living beings possess in accordance with their senses:

Senses	Number of vitalities	Vitalities
One sense	Four	Sense organ of touch, strength of body or energy, respiration, and life-duration.
Two sense	Six	The sense of taste and the organ of speech in addition to the former four.
Three sense	Seven	The sense of smell in addition to the former six.
Four sense	Eight	The sense of sight in addition to the former seven.
Five-sensed beings	Nine	The sense of hearing in addition to the former eight.
Five-sensed beings	Ten	Mind in addition to the above-mentioned nine vitalities.

== See also ==
- Jain philosophy
- Ajiva
- Pudgal
