= Akasha =

Term for space or æther

Akasha (Sanskrit: आकाश, romanized: ākāśa) means aether in traditional Hindu cosmology. The term has also been adopted in Western occultism and spiritualism in the late 19th century CE. In many modern Indo-Aryan languages and Dravidian languages the corresponding word retains a generic meaning of "aether". The Hindu god of Akasha is Dyaus.

== Etymology and meaning ==
The word in Sanskrit is derived from a root kāś meaning "to be". It appears as a masculine noun in Vedic Sanskrit with a generic meaning of "aether". In Classical Sanskrit, the noun acquires the neuter gender and may express the concept of "aether" (Manusmriti, Shatapatha Brahmana). In Vedantic philosophy, the word acquires its technical meaning of "an ethereal fluid imagined as pervading the cosmos".

Indian philosophy classifies Akasha into three categories. The first category, represented by the Nyaya, Vaisheshika, Purva Mimamsa, and Jain traditions, considers Akasha to be an independent, all-pervading, and eternal substance essential to the structure of the universe. The second category encompassing the Samkhya-Yoga and Vedanta, views Akasha as an evolute of something else. The third category regards Akasha as a mental concept, a view particularly reflected in later Buddhist systems.

== Hinduism ==
In Hinduism, akasha means the basis and essence of all things in the material world; the first element created. A Hindu mantra "pṛthivyāpastejovāyurākāśāta" indicates the sequence of initial appearance of the five basic gross elements. Thus, first appeared aether, from which appeared air, from that fire, from which water, and therefrom the earth. It is one of the Panchamahabhuta, or "five gross elements"; its main characteristic is Shabda (sound). The direct translation of akasha is the word meaning 'aether' in Hinduism.

The Nyaya and Vaisheshika schools of Hindu philosophy state that akasha (aether) is the fifth physical substance, which is the substratum of the quality of sound. It is the one, eternal, and all-pervading physical substance, which is imperceptible.

According to the Samkhya school, akasha is one of the five Mahābhūtas (grand physical elements) having the specific property of sound.

In the Shiva Purana, it identifies akasha as having "the only attribute of sound".

In the Linga Purana (Volume I, Chapter 65), akasha is translated as "aether" and is listed as one of the 1000 names of Shiva.

== Jainism ==
Akasha is space in the Jain conception of the cosmos. Akasha is one of the six dravyas (substances) and it accommodates the other five, namely sentient beings or souls (jīva), non-sentient substance or matter (pudgala), principle of motion (dharma), the principle of rest (adharma), and the principle of time (kāla).

It falls into the Ajiva category, divided into two parts: Loakasa (the part occupied by the material world) and Aloakasa (the space beyond it which is absolutely void and empty). In Loakasa the universe forms only a part. Akasha is that which gives space and makes room for the existence of all extended substances.

At the summit of the lokākāśa is the Siddhashila (abode of the liberated souls).

== Buddhism ==
In Buddhist phenomenology, akasha is divided into limited space (ākāsa-dhātu) and endless space (ajatākasā). The Vaibhāṣika, an early school of Buddhist philosophy, hold the existence of akasha to be real. Ākāsa is identified as the first arūpa jhāna, but usually translates as "infinite space."

Ākāśa (Sanskrit: "space") holds two primary meanings in Abhidharma analysis:

1. Spatiality: Ākāśa is defined as the absence that delimits forms. Like the empty space within a door frame, it is an emptiness that is shaped and defined by the material surrounding it.
2. Vast Space: Ākāśa is also described as the absence of obstruction, categorized as one of the nityadharmas (permanent phenomena) because it remains unchanged over time. In this sense, it is likened to the Western concept of ether—an immaterial, luminous fluid that supports the four material elements (mahābhūta). Its radiant quality often serves as a metaphor for buddhahood, which is described as shining like the sun or space.

In meditation, ākāśa is significant in the context of the sphere of infinite space (ākāśānantyāyatana), the first of the four immaterial absorptions (arupa-dhyānas).

Philosophically, ākāśa is considered one of the uncompounded phenomena (asaṃskṛtadharmas) in six Buddhist schools, including the Sarvāstivāda, Mahāsāṃghika, and later Yogācāra. However, three schools, including the Theravāda, reject this interpretation.

== See also ==
- Ākāśagarbha – a Bodhisattva associated with akasha
- Akashic records – Term in theosophy and anthroposophy
- Idealism in Vedic and Buddhist thought
