= Guṇa (Jainism) =

Term in Jainism for the attributes or quality of Dravya, or substance

Guṇa is a term in Jainism for the attributes or quality of Dravya, or substance. As per Jain cosmology, the universe is made up of Dravya, or substances, that are infinite in number but fall into six by categories. All substances have attributes that exist in all the parts and in all of the conditions or modes. In other words, attributes reside the substance. In addition to occupying the same space as the substance, attributes stay in the substance at all the time without any exception. Each substance has one unique attribute that distinguishes if from the other types of substances.

The concepts of Guṇa (attributes) and Dravya (substances) are what differentiates Jain worldview from Buddhist worldview. The Jain worldview claims that real cause of all the phenomena in the universe is the attributive and substantive base of those phenomena whereas Buddhist Worldview denies the existence of attributive or substantive base for any of the phenomena in the universe.

== Types ==
While the number of possible guṇa is infinite, they can be categorized into two types: sāmanya-guṇa (common/generic attributes) and vishesha-guṇa (special/specific attributes). Sāmanya-guṇa, or common/generic attributes, can be found generally in all substances. Examples of common attributes are:

- Astitva – existence
- Vastutva – functionality
- Dravyatva – changeability
- Prameyatva- knowability or knowableness
- Agurulaghutva – constancy of individuality
- Pradeshatva – shape formation or retentivity

In contrast, vishesha-guṇa, or special/specific attributes, are not found in all types of substances but are exist only in its own substance. The following are examples, though not a complete list, of specific attributes for each dravya (substances):

- Jīva (soul) – consciousness, conduct, bliss
- Pudgala (matter) – color, texture, odor, taste
- Dharma (medium of motion) – motion-causation
- Adharma (medium of rest) – stationariness-causation
- Ākāśa (space) – accommodation-causation
- Kāla (time) – function-causation
