= God in Jainism =

God in Jain religion

In Jainism, godliness is said to be the inherent quality of every soul. This quality, however, is subdued by the soul's association with karmic matter. All souls who have achieved the natural state of unlimited bliss, unlimited knowledge (kevala jnana), unlimited power and unlimited perception are regarded as God in Jainism. Jainism rejects the idea of a creator deity responsible for this universe's manifestation, creation, or maintenance. Instead, souls (in this case, devis or devas) who have reached Heaven for their merits and deeds influence the Universe for a fixed period until they undergo reincarnation and continue the cycle of enlightenment. According to Jain doctrine, the universe and its constituents (namely, soul, matter, space, time, and principles of motion) have always existed. All constituents and actions are governed by universal natural laws and a "perfect soul" (an immaterial entity that cannot create or affect a material entity like the universe).

== Definition ==
From the essential perspective, the soul of every living organism is perfect in every way, is independent of any actions of the organism, and is considered God or to have godliness; the epithet of God is given to the soul whose properties manifest in accordance with its inherent nature. There are countably infinite souls in the universe.

According to Ratnakaranda śrāvakācāra (a major Jain text):

आप्तेनो च्छिनदोषेण सर्वज्ञेनागमेशिना ।
भवितव्यं नियोगेन नान्यथा ह्याप्तता भवेत् ॥५॥

In the nature of things the true God should be free from the faults and weaknesses of the lower nature; [he should be] the knower of all things and the revealer of dharma; in no other way can divinity be constituted.

क्षुत्पिपासाजराजरातक्ड जन्मान्तकभयस्मयाः ।
न रागद्वेषमोहाश्च यस्याप्तः स प्रकीर्त्यते ॥६॥
He alone who is free from hunger, thirst, senility, disease, birth, death, fear, pride, attachment, aversion, infatuation, worry, conceit, hatred, uneasiness, sweat, sleep and surprise is called a God.

== Godliness ==
In Jainism, godliness is said to be an inherent quality of every soul (or every living organism), characterized by infinite bliss, infinite power, Kevala Jnana (pure infinite knowledge), infinite perception, and perfect manifestation of infinite, though countable, other attributes. There are two possible views after this point: One is to look at the soul from the soul's perspective. This entails explanations of the properties of the soul, its exact structure, composition, and nature, the nature of various states that arise from it and their source attributes as is done in the deep and arcane texts of Samayasāra, Niyamasara and Pravachanasara. Another view is to consider things apart from the soul and their relationships with the soul. According to this view, the qualities of a soul are subdued due to karmas of the soul. In Jainism, karmas are the fundamental particles of nature. A god can be termed one who achieves soul-perfection through Ratnatraya. This soul perfection is called Kevalin. A god thus becomes a liberated soul: liberated from miseries, cycles of rebirth, the world, karmas, and the body, as well. The liberated soul has achieved nirvana or moksha.

Jainism does not posit the dependency on any supreme being for enlightenment. The Tirthankara is a guide and teacher who points the way to enlightenment, but the struggle for enlightenment is one's own. Moral rewards and sufferings are not the work of a divine being but a result of an innate moral order in the cosmos, a self-regulating mechanism whereby the individual reaps the fruits of his own actions through the workings of the karmas.

Jains believe that to attain enlightenment and ultimately liberation from all karmic bonding, one must practice the ethical principles not only in thought but also in words (speech) and action. Such a practice through lifelong work towards oneself is regarded as observing the Mahavrata ("Great Vows").

Thus, Gods can be categorized into embodied gods, also known as Arihantas, and non-embodied formless gods, called Siddhas. Jainism considers devis and devas to be souls who dwell in the heavens owing to meritorious deeds in their past lives. These souls are in Heaven for a fixed lifespan, and even they must undergo reincarnation as humans to achieve moksha.

Thus, there are infinite gods in Jainism: all equivalent, liberated, and limitless in the manifestation of all attributes. The Self and karmas are separate substances in Jainism, the former living and the latter non-living. The attainment of enlightenment and the one who exists in such a state, and those who have achieved such a state, can be termed "gods". Therefore, beings who have attained omniscience (kevala jnana) are worshipped as gods (Arihants). The quality of godliness is one and the same in all of them. Jainism is sometimes regarded as a transtheistic religion, though it can be atheistic or polytheistic based on the way one defines "God".

== Five supreme beings ==
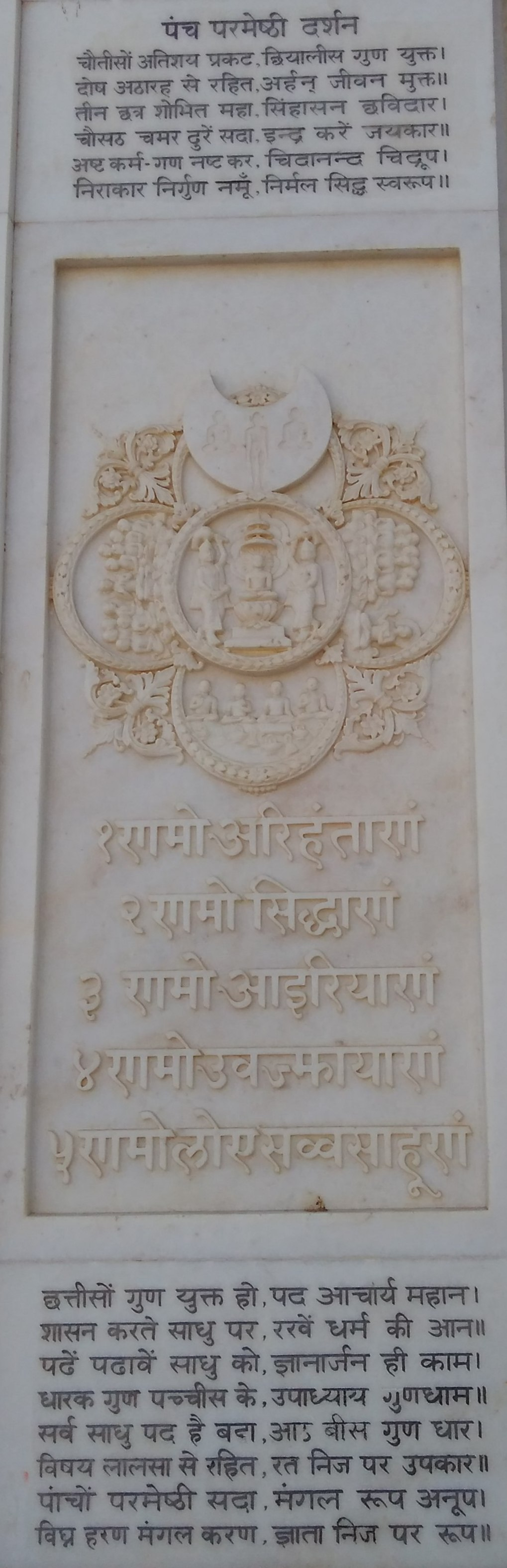
Stella depicting Pañca-Parameṣṭhi (five supreme beings) worthy of veneration as per Jainism

In Jainism, the Pañca-Parameṣṭhi (Sanskrit for "five supreme beings") are a fivefold hierarchy of religious authorities worthy of veneration. The five supreme beings are:

1. Arihant
2. Siddha
3. Acharya (Head of the monastic order)
4. Upadhyaya ("Preceptor of less advanced ascetics")
5. Muni or Jain monks

== Arihant ==
A human being who conquers all inner passions and possesses infinite right knowledge (Kevala Jnana) is revered as an arihant in Jainism. They are also called Jinas (conquerors) or Kevalin (omniscient beings). An arihant is a soul who has destroyed all passions, is totally unattached and without any desire and hence is able to destroy the four ghātiyā karmas and attain kevala jñāna, or omniscience. Such a soul still has a body and four aghātiyā karmas. Arihantas, at the end of their human life-span, destroy all remaining aghātiyā karmas and attain Siddhahood. There are two kinds of kevalin or arihant:

- Sāmānya Kevalin–Ordinary victors, who are concerned with their own salvation.
- Tirthankara Kevalin–Twenty-four human spiritual guides (teaching gods), who show the true path to salvation.

The Dravyasaṃgraha, a major Jain text, states:

Having destroyed the four inimical varieties of karmas (ghātiyā karmas), possessed of infinite faith, happiness, knowledge and power, and housed in most auspicious body (paramaudārika śarīra), that pure soul of the World Teacher (Arihant) should be meditated on.

— Dravyasaṃgraha (50)

== Tīrthaṅkara ==
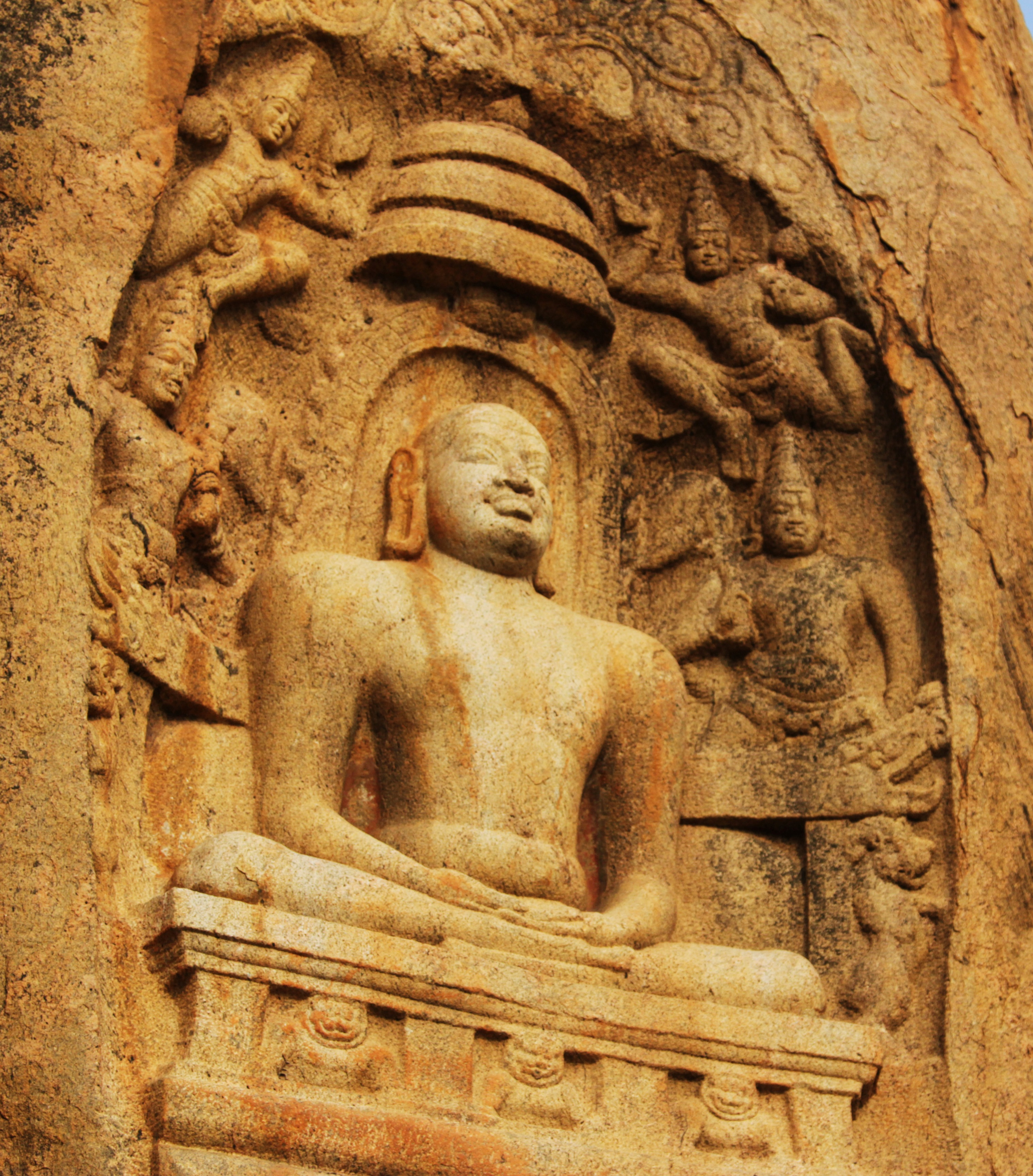
Image of Vardhamana Mahavira, the 24th and last Tirthankara (Photo:Samanar Hills)

The word Tīrthaṅkara signifies the founder of a tirtha which means a fordable passage across a sea. The Tirthankara show the "fordable path" across the sea of interminable births and deaths. Jain philosophy divides the wheel of time in two halves, Utsarpiṇī or ascending time cycle and avasarpiṇī, the descending time cycle. Exactly 24 Tirthankara are said to grace each half of the cosmic time cycle. Rishabhanatha was the first Tirthankara and Mahavira was the last Tirthankara of avasarpiṇī.

Tirthankara revive the fourfold order of Shraman, Shramani, Śrāvaka, and Śrāvika called sangha. Tirthankara can be called teaching gods who teach the Jain philosophy. However it would be a mistake to regard the tirthankara as gods analogous to the gods of the Hindu pantheon despite the superficial resemblances between Jain and Hindu ways of worship. Tirthankara, being liberated, are beyond any kind of transactions with the rest of the universe. They are not the beings who exercise any sort of creative activity or who have the capacity or ability to intervene in answers to prayers.

Tirthamkara-nama-karma is a special type of karma, bondage of which raises a soul to the supreme status of a tirthankara.

== Siddhas ==
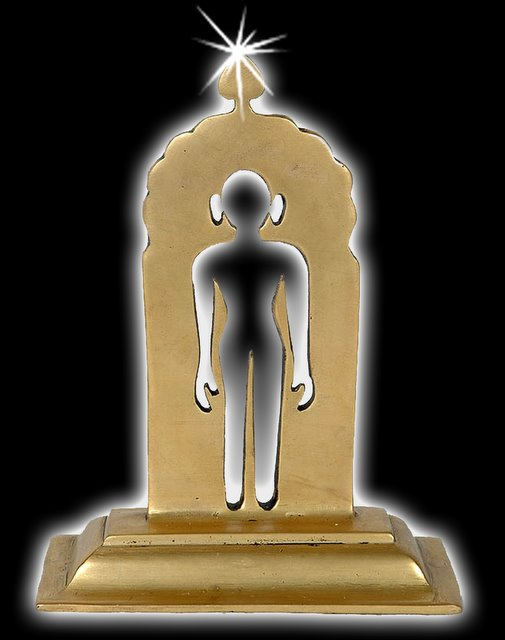
Although the siddhas (the liberated beings) are formless and without a body, this is how the Jain temples often depict them.

Ultimately all arihantas become siddhas, or liberated souls, at the time of their nirvana. A siddha is a soul who is permanently liberated from the transmigratory cycle of birth and death. Such a soul, having realized its true self, is free from all the Karmas and embodiment. They are formless and dwell in Siddhashila (the realm of the liberated beings) at the apex of the universe in infinite bliss, infinite perception, infinite knowledge and infinite energy.

The Ācārāṅga Sūtra 1.197 describes siddhas in this way:

The liberated soul is not long nor small nor round nor triangular nor quadrangular nor circular; it is not black nor blue nor red nor green nor white; neither of good nor bad smell; not bitter nor pungent nor astringent nor sweet; neither rough nor soft; neither heavy nor light; neither cold nor hot; neither harsh nor smooth; it is without body, without resurrection, without contact (of matter), it is not feminine nor masculine nor neuter. The siddha perceives and knows all, yet is beyond comparison. Its essence is without form; there is no condition of the unconditioned. It is not sound, not colour, not smell, not taste, not touch or anything of that kind. Thus I say.

Siddhashila as per the Jain cosmology

Siddhahood is the ultimate goal of all souls. There are infinite souls who have become siddhas and infinite more who will attain this state of liberation.^{[d]} According to Jainism, Godhood is not a monopoly of some omnipotent and powerful being(s). All souls, with right perception, knowledge and conduct can achieve self-realisation and attain this state. Once achieving this state of infinite bliss and having destroyed all desires, the soul is not concerned with worldly matters and does not interfere in the working of the universe, as any activity or desire to interfere will once again result in influx of karmas and thus loss of liberation.

Jains pray to these passionless Gods not for any favors or rewards but rather pray to the qualities of the God with the objective of destroying the karmas and achieving the Godhood. This is best understood by the term vandetadgunalabhdhaye – i.e. "we pray to the attributes of such Gods to acquire such attributes" ^{[f]}

According to Anne Vallely:

Jainism is not a religion of coming down. In Jainism it is we who must go up. We only have to help ourselves. In Jainism we have to become God. That is the only thing.

According to Jains, siddhas have eight specific characteristics or qualities. Ancient Tamil Jain Classic 'Choodamani Nigandu' describes the eight characteristics in a poem, which is given below.

கடையிலா ஞானத்தோடு காட்சி வீரியமே இன்ப
மிடையுறு நாமமின்மை விதித்த கோத்திரங்களின்மை
அடைவிலா ஆயுஇன்மை அந்தராயங்கள் இன்மை
உடையவன் யாவன் மற்று இவ்வுலகினுக்கு இறைவனாமே

The soul that has infinite knowledge (Ananta jnāna, கடையிலா ஞானம்), infinite vision or wisdom (Ananta darshana, கடையிலா காட்சி), infinite power (Ananta labdhi, கடையிலா வீரியம்), infinite bliss (Ananta sukha, கடையிலா இன்பம்), without name (Akshaya sthiti, நாமமின்மை), without association to any caste (Being vitāraga, கோத்திரமின்மை), infinite life span (Being arupa, ஆயுள் இன்மை) and without any change (Aguruladhutaa, அழியா இயல்பு) is God.

== Devas ==
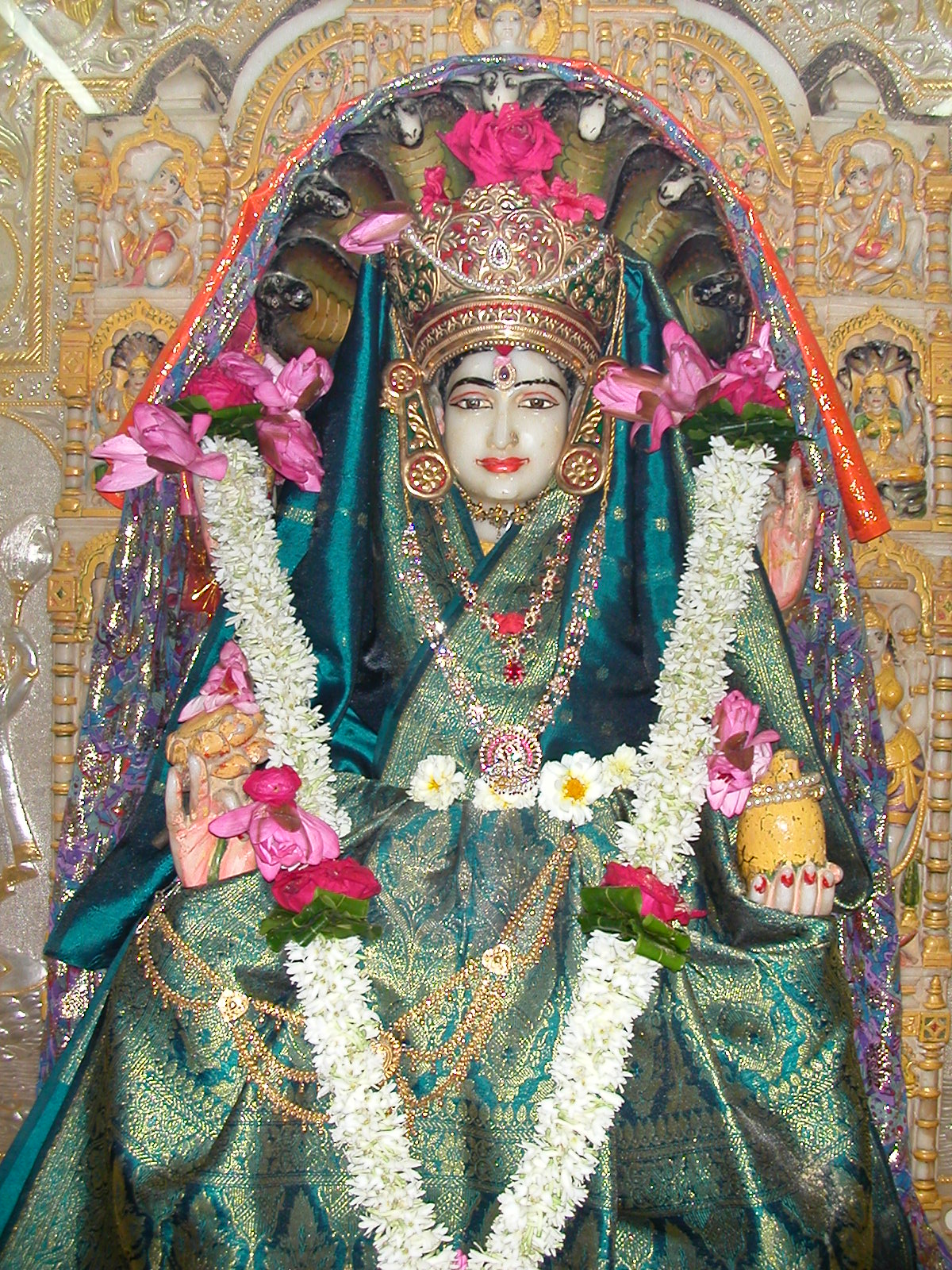
Idol of Padmāvatī devī, śāsanadevī of Lord Parshvanatha at Walkeshwar Temple. According to Digambar Terapanth, worship of such deities is considered as mithyātva or wrong belief. However, in the Bispanthi Digambar tradition and the Shwetambar tradition, Padmavati is a popular Jain goddess.

Jain cosmology offers an elaborate description of heavenly beings (devas), but these beings are neither viewed as creators nor are they immortal; they are subject to suffering and change like all other living beings, and must eventually die. In this way, they are similar to the devas of Buddhism. English-language material tends to retain the term "deva" or describe these beings as "deities", "gods" and "goddesses."

Jainism describes existence of śāsanadevatās and śāsanadevīs, the attendants of a Tirthankara, who create the samavasarana or the divine preaching assembly of a Tirthankara. Such heavenly beings are classified as:-

- Bhavanapatis – Devas dwelling in abodes
- Vyantaras – Intermediary devas
- Jyotiṣkas – Luminaries
- Vaimānikas – Astral devas

The souls on account of accumulation of meritorious karmas reincarnate in heavens as devas. Although their life span is quite long, after their merit karmas are exhausted, they once again have to reincarnate back into the realms of humans, animals or hells depending on their karmas. As these devas themselves are not liberated, they have attachments and passions and hence not worthy of worship.

Ācārya Hemachandra decries the worship of such devas:

These heavenly beings (devas above) tainted with attachment and passion; having women and weapons by their side, favour some and disfavour some; Such heavenly beings (devas) should not be worshipped by those who desire emancipation

Worship of such devas is considered as mithyatva or wrong belief leading to bondage of karmas.

== Jain opposition to creationism ==
Jain scriptures reject God as the creator of the universe. Further, it asserts that no god is responsible or causal for actions in the life of any living organism. Ācārya Hemacandra in the 12th century put forth the Jain view of the universe in the Yogaśāstra:

This universe is not created nor sustained by anyone; It is self-sustaining, without any base or support

Besides scriptural authority, Jains also resorted to syllogism and deductive reasoning to refute the creationist theories. Various views on divinity and the universe held by the Vedics, samkhyas, mīmāṃsās, Buddhists and other schools of thought were analyzed, debated and repudiated by various Jain Ācāryas. However, the most eloquent refutation of this view is provided by Ācārya Jinasena in Mahāpurāna, which was quoted by Carl Sagan in his 1980 book Cosmos.

Some foolish men declare that creator made the world. The doctrine that the world was created is ill advised and should be rejected.

If God created the world, where was he before the creation? If you say he was transcendent then and needed no support, where is he now? How could God have made this world without any raw material? If you say that he made this first, and then the world, you are faced with an endless regression.

If you declare that this raw material arose naturally you fall into another fallacy, for the whole universe might thus have been its own creator, and have arisen quite naturally.

If God created the world by an act of his own will, without any raw material, then it is just his will and nothing else — and who will believe this silly nonsense?

If he is ever perfect and complete, how could the will to create have arisen in him? If, on the other hand, he is not perfect, he could no more create the universe than a potter could.

If he is form-less, action-less and all-embracing, how could he have created the world? Such a soul, devoid of all modality, would have no desire to create anything.

If he is perfect, he does not strive for the three aims of man, so what advantage would he gain by creating the universe?

If you say that he created to no purpose because it was his nature to do so, then God is pointless. If he created in some kind of sport, it was the sport of a foolish child, leading to trouble.

If he created because of the karma of embodied beings (acquired in a previous creation), then he is not the Almighty Lord, but subordinate to something else.

If out of love for living beings and need of them he made the world, why did he not make creation wholly blissful free from misfortune?

If he were transcendent he would not create, for he would be free: Nor if involved in transmigration, for then he would not be almighty. Thus the doctrine that the world was created by God makes no sense at all.

And God commits great sin in slaying the children whom he himself created. If you say that he slays only to destroy evil beings, why did he create such beings in the first place?

Good men should combat the believer in divine creation, maddened by an evil doctrine. Know that the world is uncreated, as time itself is, without beginning or end, and is based on the principles, life and rest. Uncreated and indestructible, it endures under the compulsion of its own nature.

— Mahapurana (Jainism) (The Great legend), Jainasena (India, ninth century)

== See also ==
- Nontheistic religions
- Jainism
