= Ākāśa (Jainism) =

Ākāśa is space in the Jain conception of the cosmos. It is one of the six dravyas (substances) and it accommodates the other five, namely sentient beings or souls (jīva), non-sentient substance or matter (pudgala), principle of motion (dharma), the principle of rest (adharma) and time (kāla)

Ākāśa provides the space for other substances. It does not obstruct. There are two types: Lokakasha and Alokakasha. Alokakasha is beyond the Lokakasha and is empty; it has no other substance.

== Etymology ==
Ākāśa is a compound word of Sanskrit language, wherein "ā" refers to "towards" and "kāśa" refers "to be visible or to appear".

== Attributes ==
Space provides room to all other substances of the universe. The characteristic of space is to give room to or accommodate the other substances. The special feature of space is that it is not restricted to the universe like other substances but extends beyond the universe to the non-universe.

The space inside is lōka-ākāsa. Outside is āloka-ākāsa

Its qualities are as follows:

- Provides room to soul, matter, medium of motion, and medium of rest
- Pervades everywhere (infinite)
- Supports everything and thus it is self supported
- Have no form, color, taste, smell, and touch
- Does not perform any active action (inactive)
- Provides accommodation to soul and matter of their actions
- Is one and whole

Sky and space both are different. We can see the sky because it is modification of the Pudgala whereas space is invisible.

== Types ==
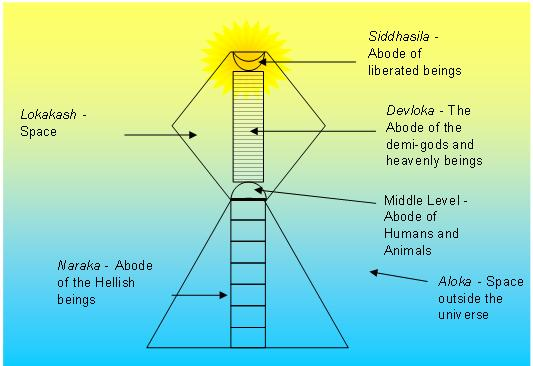
Structure of Universe according to the Jain scriptures.

Space substance is only one substance and as such it is indivisible (akhand). Universe (lokakasha) and non-universe (alokakasha) are considered its two divisions. Space is divided into two parts:

- Lokakas - Where medium of motion and rest substances exist
- Alokakas - The remaining space, which is empty and void.

The dimension of Lokakasha is fourteen rajlok or rajju, however Alokakasha is infinite.

=== Lokakasha ===
That portion of space in which all the substances are found is called the universe (lokakash). There are three types of Lokakasha; a) Urdhwa Lok, where beings of higher qualities than us live (Siddha Lok where liberated souls stay is at the top of Urdhwalok), b) Madhya Lok - where human beings and other creatures live, and c) Adho Lok, where the inmates of hell live (it has seven layers).

At the summit of the lokākāśa is the Siddhashila (abode of the liberated souls).

The dharma and adharma dravyas are present only in Lokakasha and that is why jiva and pudgal are also there in the Lokakasha only.

=== Alokakasha ===
The (empty) infinite space outside the universe is called the non-universe (alokakash). In the non-universe, space alone exists without the other five substances. In non-universe there is nothing but space.

Alokakash is perceptible only to the omniscient.
