= Ajiva =

Soulless object in the Indian religion of Jainism

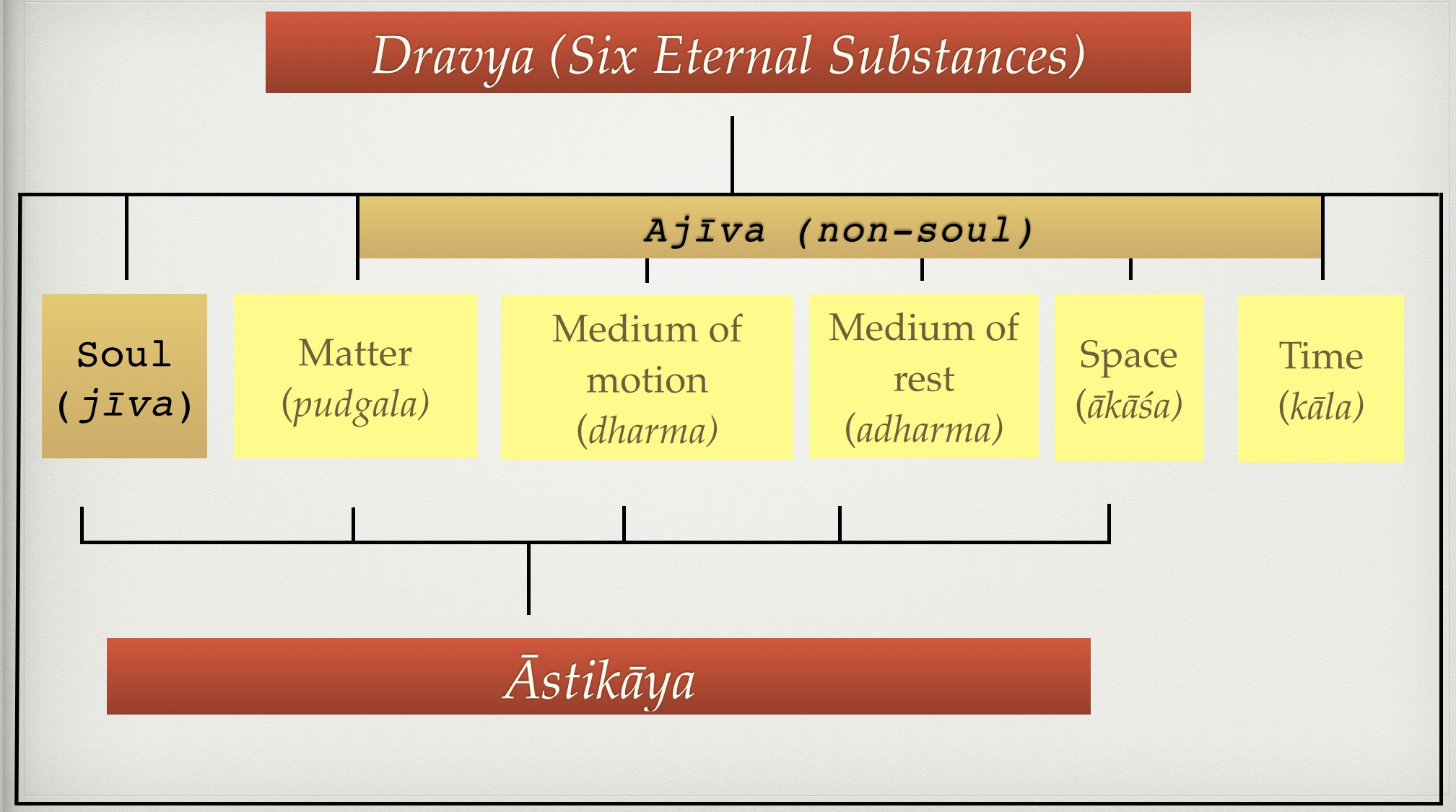
Dravya

Ajiva (Sanskrit) is anything that has no soul or life, the polar opposite of "jīva" (soul). Because ajiva has no life, it does not accumulate karma and cannot die. Examples of ajiva include chairs, computers, paper, plastic, etc.

== Five categories of Ajiva ==
In Jainism, there are five categories which ajīva can be placed into. Out of these, four categories, Dharma (medium of motion), Adharma (medium of rest), Akasha (space) and Pudgala (matter) are described as the asti-kaya dravya's (substances which possess constituent parts extending in space) while the fifth category Kala is an anasti-kaya dravya (which has no extension in space).

=== Dharma-Astikaya ===
Dharmastikaya is formed from the two words: Dharma & Astikaya. Dharma here isn't referring to religion, but instead its referring to the medium of motion. Astikay itself is formed of two words: Asti & Kaya. Asti means space, body or mode and Kaya means collection. So Astikaya means a collection of spaces or regions. Dharmastikaya denotes the medium of motion for things in the universe. In the absence of this medium, living things (i.e. jiva) would not be able to move.

=== Adharma-Astikaya ===
Adharmastikaya is also formed from two words: Adharma & Astikaya. Adharma in this case means the medium of rest. In the absence of this medium, Living things or jiva would continuously move.

=== Ākāśa -Astikaya ===
The infinity of space, called ākāśa in Sanskrit, is divided by the Jain philosophy into two parts, namely, the lokākāśa (loka+ākāśa), that is the space occupied by the universe, and the alokākāśa (a not, and lokākāśa), the portion beyond the universe. The lokākāśa is the portion in which are to be found the remaining five substances, i.e., Jīvas, Matter, Time, Dharma and Adharma; but the alokākāśa is the region of pure space containing no other substance and lying stretched on all sides beyond bounds of the three worlds (the entire universe). At the summit of the lokākāśa is the Siddhashila (abode of the liberated souls).

=== Pudgala-Astikaya ===
The word Pudgala is made up of two terms: Pud means supplement (integration) and Gala means disintegration (division). In other words, what continuously changes by supplementation and/or division (purayanti galanti cha) is called Pudgala or matter. All matter in the universe is called Pudgala. Pudgala has form and shape. Pudgala can be experienced by touching, tasting, smelling, or seeing. Like Jiva Pudgala is also mobile. According to Jainism, The karma particles that attach to our souls are also Pudgala. Pudgala can only be divided and subdivided to a certain extent that it is not possible to further subdivide it. This indivisible part of Pudgala, which is separated from the main pudgala, is called Paramanu. A paramanu is much more minute than even an atom. When a Paramanu is attached to the main pudgala, it is called a Pradesha. These subatomic Paramanus are too minute to be detected by normal vision, but they can be combined. Thus when a paramanu is combined with one or more other paramanus, they are called a skandha which are more or less like a molecules. Part of skandha is called desha. Such skandhas may be large or small. Small skandhas may be invisible to the eye, but they can be seen when the combinations are larger.

=== Kala ===
Kala refers to time that brings forth changes. Past, present, and future are the different modes of time and are measured in terms of years, months, days, hours, minutes or seconds. For practical purposes a second happens to be the finest measurement of time. Jainism however, recognizes a very small measurement of time known as samayā which is an infinitely small part of a second.

Kala (time) is infinite, but there are cycles (kalachakras) in it. Each cycle having two eras of equal duration described as the avasarpini and the utsarpini. The former is a descending era in which virtue gradually decreases. The latter is an ascending era in which the reverse takes place. The present era is stated to be the former.
