= Tirthankara =

Supreme spiritual teacher in Jainism

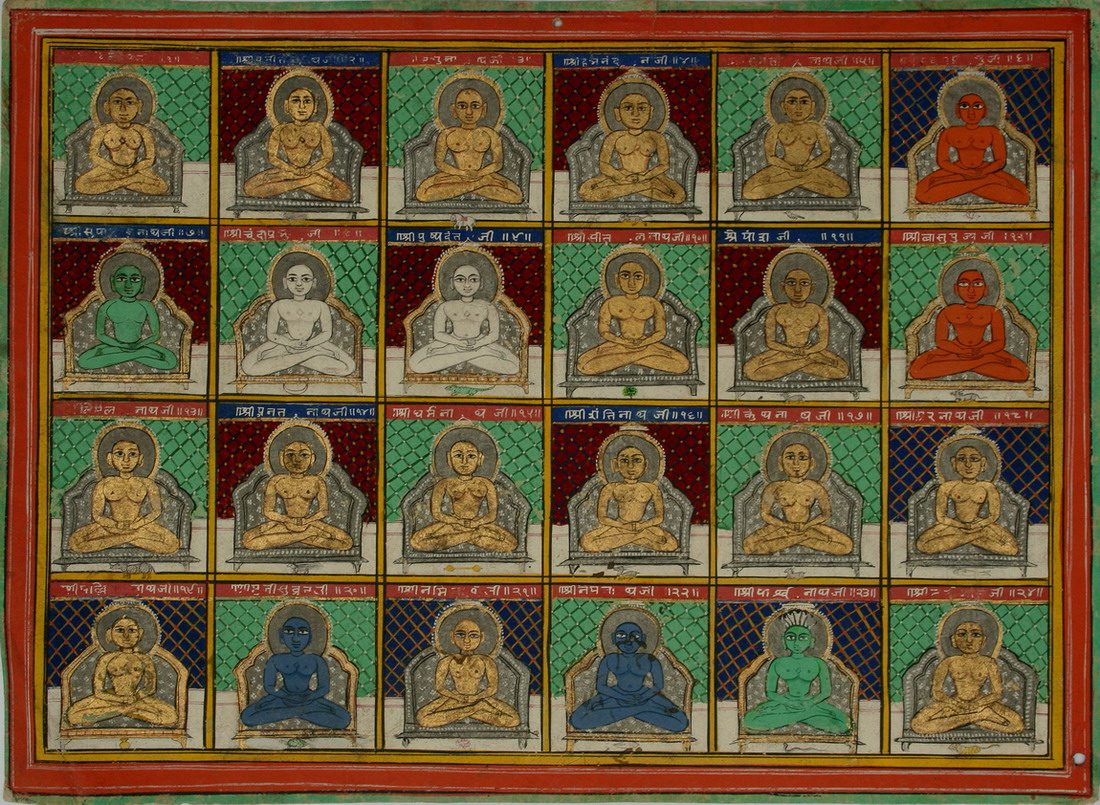
Jain miniature painting of 24 Jain Tirthaṅkaras, Jaipur, c. 1850

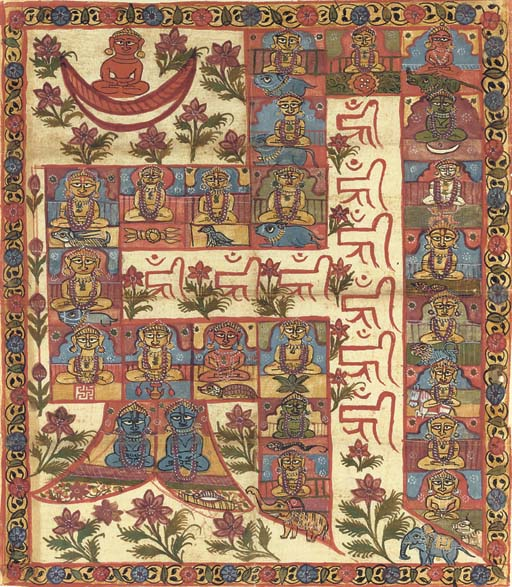
The 24 Tirthaṅkaras forming the tantric meditative syllable Hrim, painting on cloth, Gujarat, c. 1800

In Jainism, a Tirthaṅkara (IAST: tīrthaṅkara; lit. 'ford-maker') is a saviour and supreme preacher of the dharma (righteous path). The term refers to one who establishes a tirtha, a fordable passage across saṃsāra, the sea of interminable birth and death. According to Jains, tirthaṅkaras are the supreme preachers of dharma, who have conquered saṃsāra on their own and established a path for others to follow. After understanding the true nature of the self or soul, the Tīrthaṅkara attains kevala jnana (omniscience). A Tirthaṅkara provides a bridge for others to follow from saṃsāra to moksha (liberation).

In Jain cosmology, the wheel of time is divided into two halves, Utsarpiṇī, the ascending time cycle, and Avasarpiṇī, the descending time cycle, of which the latter is the current cycle. In each half of the cycle, exactly 24 tirthaṅkaras are said to appear in this part of the universe. There have been infinitely many tirthaṅkaras in the past. The first tirthaṅkara in the present cycle (Hunda Avsarpinī) was Rishabhanatha, who is credited with formulating and organising humans to live in a society harmoniously. The 24th and last tirthaṅkara of the present half-cycle is traditionally identified as Mahavira (599 BCE–527 BCE). History records the existence of Mahavira and his predecessor, Parshvanatha, the 23rd tirthaṅkara in the 9th century BCE.

A tirthaṅkara organises the sangha, a fourfold order comprising male and female monastics, śrāvakas (male followers) and śrāvikās (female followers).

The teachings of a tirthaṅkara form the basis for the Jain canons. The inner knowledge of a tirthaṅkara is believed to be perfect and identical in every respect, and their teachings contain no contradictions. The degree of elaboration varies according to the level of society's spiritual advancement and purity during the tirthaṅkara's period of leadership. The higher the level of society's spiritual advancement and purity of mind, the lower the elaboration required.

While Jains document and revere tirthaṅkaras, their grace is said to be available to all living beings regardless of religion.

Tīrthaṅkaras are arihants who, after attaining kevala jñāna (pure infinite knowledge), preach the dharma. An Arihant is also called a Jina (victor), meaning one who has conquered inner enemies such as anger, attachment, pride, and greed. They dwell exclusively within the realm of their soul and are entirely free of kashayas, inner passions, and personal desires. As a result of this, unlimited siddhis, or spiritual powers, are readily available to them, which they use exclusively for the spiritual elevation of living beings. Through darśana, divine vision, and deshna, divine speech, they help others attain kevalajñana and moksha (final liberation).

== Etymology ==
The word tirthaṅkara signifies the founder of a tirtha, a fordable passage across saṃsāra, the sea of interminable births and deaths. Tīrthaṅkaras are variously called "Teaching Gods", "Ford-Makers", "Crossing Makers", and "Makers of the River-Crossing".

== Historicity and Hagiography ==
=== The historical Tirthaṅkaras ===
Academic and historical consensus broadly accepts Parshvanatha (c. 8th century BCE) and Mahavira (c. 6th century BCE) as historical figures. Parshvanatha, the 23rd tirthaṅkara, is understood as a predecessor who preached the "fourfold restraint" (chaturyama dharma). Mahavira is seen as a restorer of Jaina Dharma. He is also seen as a reformer and the final systematizer of Jain thought, who re-established the Jain monastic and lay community based on Parshvanatha's teachings, notably adding celibacy as the fifth great vow.

=== The hagiographical Tradition ===
The lives of the other 22 tirthaṅkaras are considered to be part of a sacred, cosmological history set within vast, non-historical timeframes. Texts such as the Kalpa Sutra detail their lives, which follow a formulaic pattern: birth into a royal family, a period of worldly life, renunciation of the world (diksha), a period of asceticism leading to omniscience (kevala jnana), and finally, liberation (nirvana).

=== The Rishabhanatha Debate ===
Rishabhanatha (or Adinatha), the first tirthaṅkara, holds a unique position. According to Jain tradition, he founded human civilisation and taught agriculture, law, and social order. While he is a hagiographical figure, some scholars have speculated about a pre-historical link. They point to the nude standing figures and the prominent "bull" motif found on seals from the Indus Valley Civilization (c. 3300–1300 BCE) as possible, though unproven, evidence of a proto-Jain or proto-Rishabha cult.

== Theology and sectarian views ==
=== Tīrthaṅkara-naam-karma ===
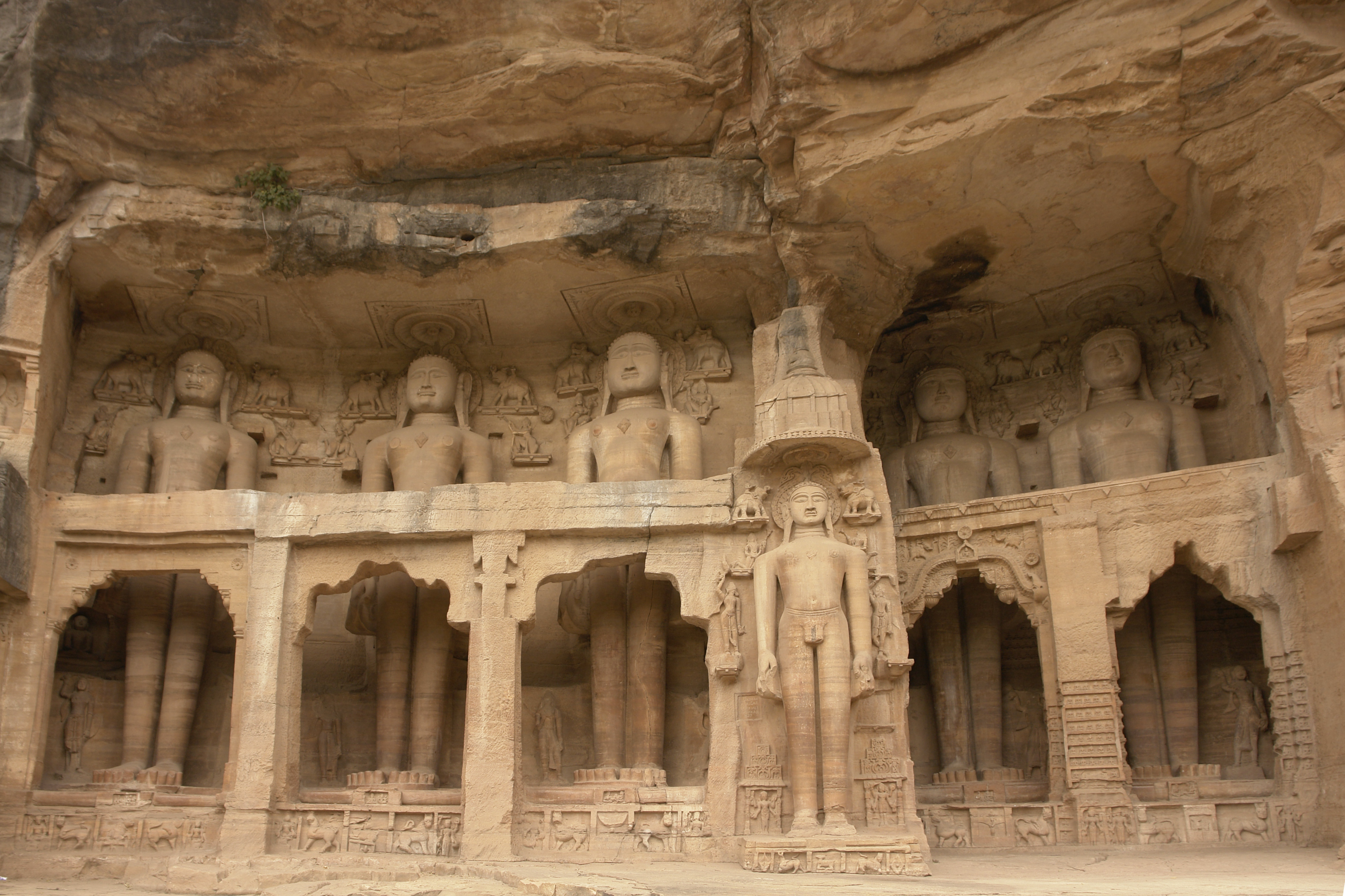
Tirthaṅkara images at Siddhachal Caves inside Gwalior Fort.

Jain texts propound that a special type of karma, the tīrthaṅkara nama-karma, raises a soul to the supreme status of a Tīrthaṅkara. The Tattvartha Sutra, a major Jain text, lists 16 observances that lead to the bandha (bondage) of this karma:

- Purity of right faith
- Reverence
- Observance of vows and supplementary vows without transgressions
- Ceaseless pursuit of knowledge
- Perpetual fear of the cycle of existence
- Giving gifts (charity)
- Practising austerities according to one's capacity
- Removal of obstacles that threaten the equanimity of ascetics
- Serving the meritorious by warding off evil or suffering
- Devotion to omniscient lords, chief preceptors, preceptors, and the scriptures
- Practice of the six essential duties
- Propagation of the teachings of the omniscient
- Fervent affection for one's brethren following the same path.

=== Panch Kalyanaka (Five Auspicious Events) ===
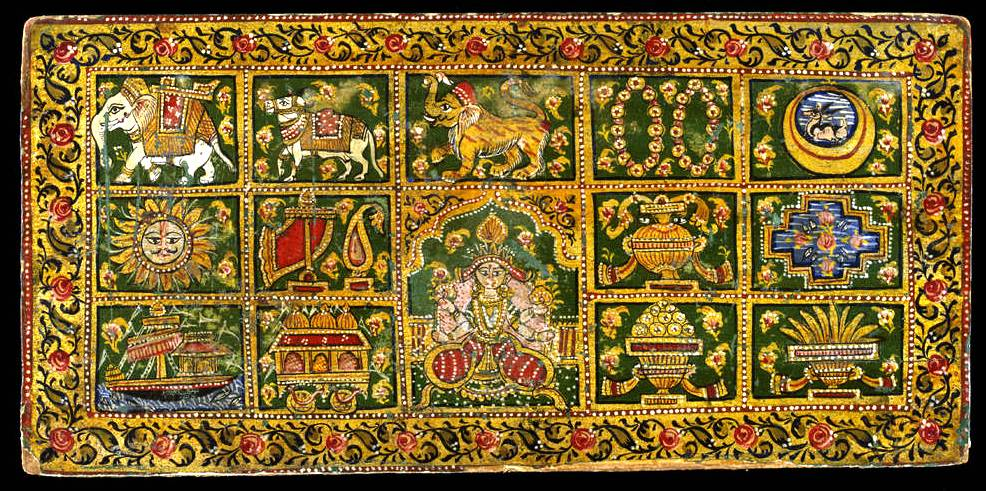
Auspicious 14 dreams seen by a tirthaṅkara's mother during pregnancy as an ornamentation on cover of 19th-century manuscript

Five auspicious events called Pañca kalyāṇaka mark every tirthaṅkara's life:

1. Chyavana kalyāṇaka (conception): When a tirthaṅkara's ātman (soul) comes into their mother's womb.
2. Janma kalyāṇaka (birth): Birth of a tirthaṅkara. Indra performs a ceremonial bath on tirthaṅkara on Mount Meru.
3. Diksha kalyāṇaka (renunciation): When a tirthaṅkara renounces all worldly possessions and becomes an ascetic.
4. Keval Gyan kalyāṇaka (omniscience): When a tirthaṅkara attains kevalajñāna (infinite knowledge). A samavasarana (divine preaching hall) is then erected from where they deliver sermons and establish 'tirth (chaturvidh sangha).
5. Nirvāṇa/Moksha kalyāṇaka (liberation): Nirvana is when a tirthaṅkara leaves their mortal body. It is followed by the final liberation, moksha, after which their soul resides in Siddhashila.

=== Samavasarana ===
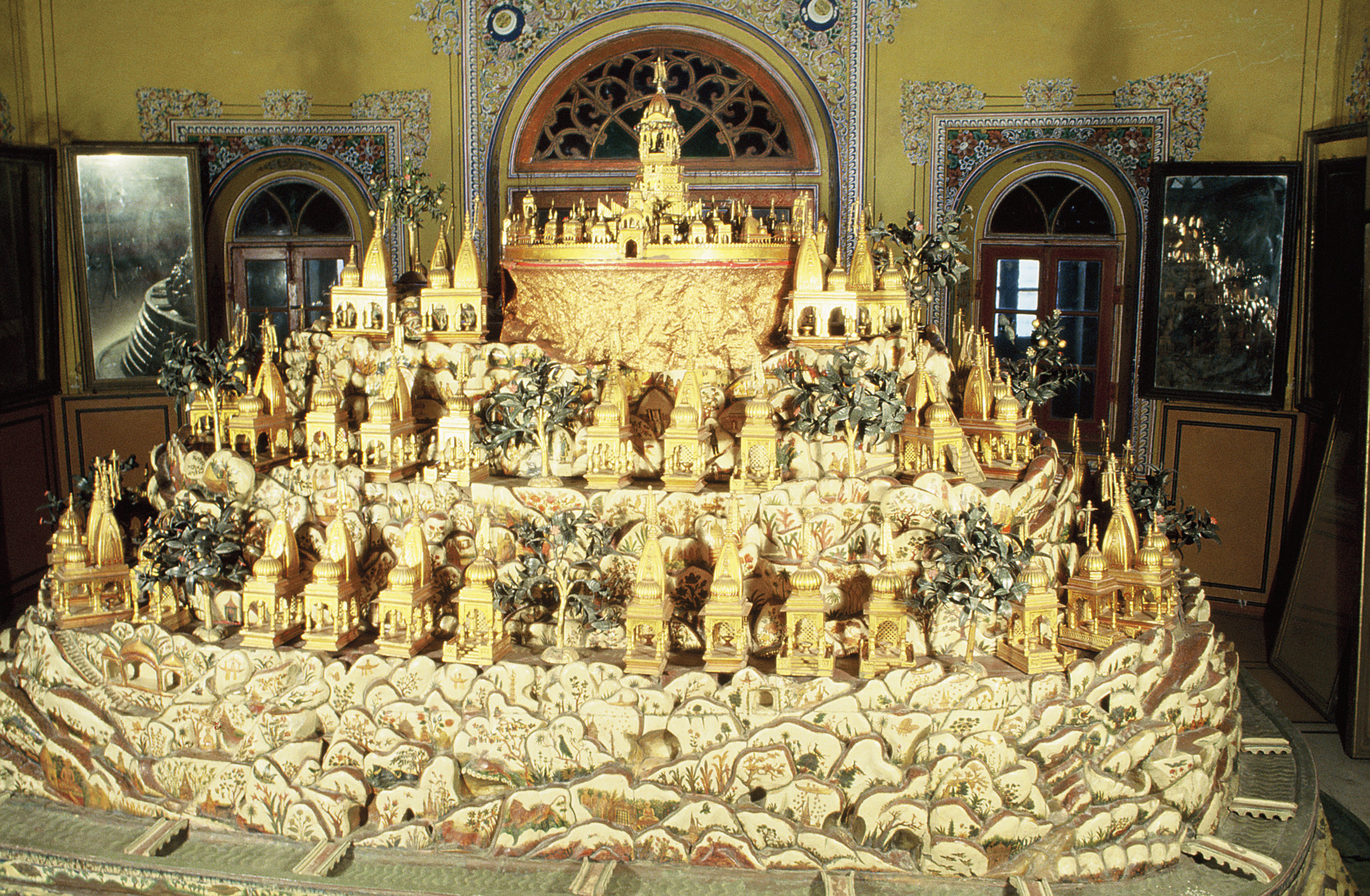
Samavasarana of tirthaṅkara Rishabha (Ajmer Jain temple)

After attaining kevalajñāna, the tirthaṅkara preaches the path to liberation in the samavasarana. According to Jain texts, devas (heavenly beings) erect the heavenly pavilion where devas, humans, and animals assemble to hear the tirthaṅkara. A samavasarana is a three-level structure. The lowest level, made of rajat (silver), is the parking space for vehicles. The second is the svarna (gold) level. All animals reside in the svarna level, while the highest level, made of precious gems, is reserved for various important figures, such as kings and their families, the devas and the ascetics. Humans and animals hear a tirthaṅkara's speech in their language. It is believed that during this speech, there is no unhappiness for miles around the site.

== List of Tīrthaṅkaras ==
Jainism postulates that time has no beginning or end. It moves like the wheel of a cart. The wheel of time is divided into two halves, Utsarpiṇī (ascending half cycle) and Avasarpiṇī (descending half cycle). 24 tirthaṅkaras are born in each half of this cycle. In Jain tradition, the tirthaṅkaras were royal in their final lives, and Jain texts record details of those lives. Their clan and families are also among those recorded in legendary stories. According to Jain canons, Rishabhanatha, the first tirthaṅkara, founded the Ikshvaku dynasty, from which 21 other tirthaṅkaras rose over time. Two tirthaṅkaras – Munisuvrata, the 20th, and Neminatha, the 22nd – belonged to the Harivamsa dynasty.

In Jain tradition, the 20 tirthaṅkaras attained moksha on Mount Shikharji, in the present Indian state of Jharkhand. Rishabhanatha attained nirvana on Mount Ashtāpada (Mount Kailash), Vasupujya in Champapuri, Bihar, Neminatha on Mount Girnar, Gujarat, and Mahavira, the last tirthaṅkara, at Pawapuri, near modern Patna. Twenty-one of the tirthaṅkaras are said to have attained moksha in the kayotsarga (standing meditation posture), while Rishabhanatha, Neminatha, and Mahavira are said to have done so in the Padmasana (lotus position).

=== Present cosmic age ===
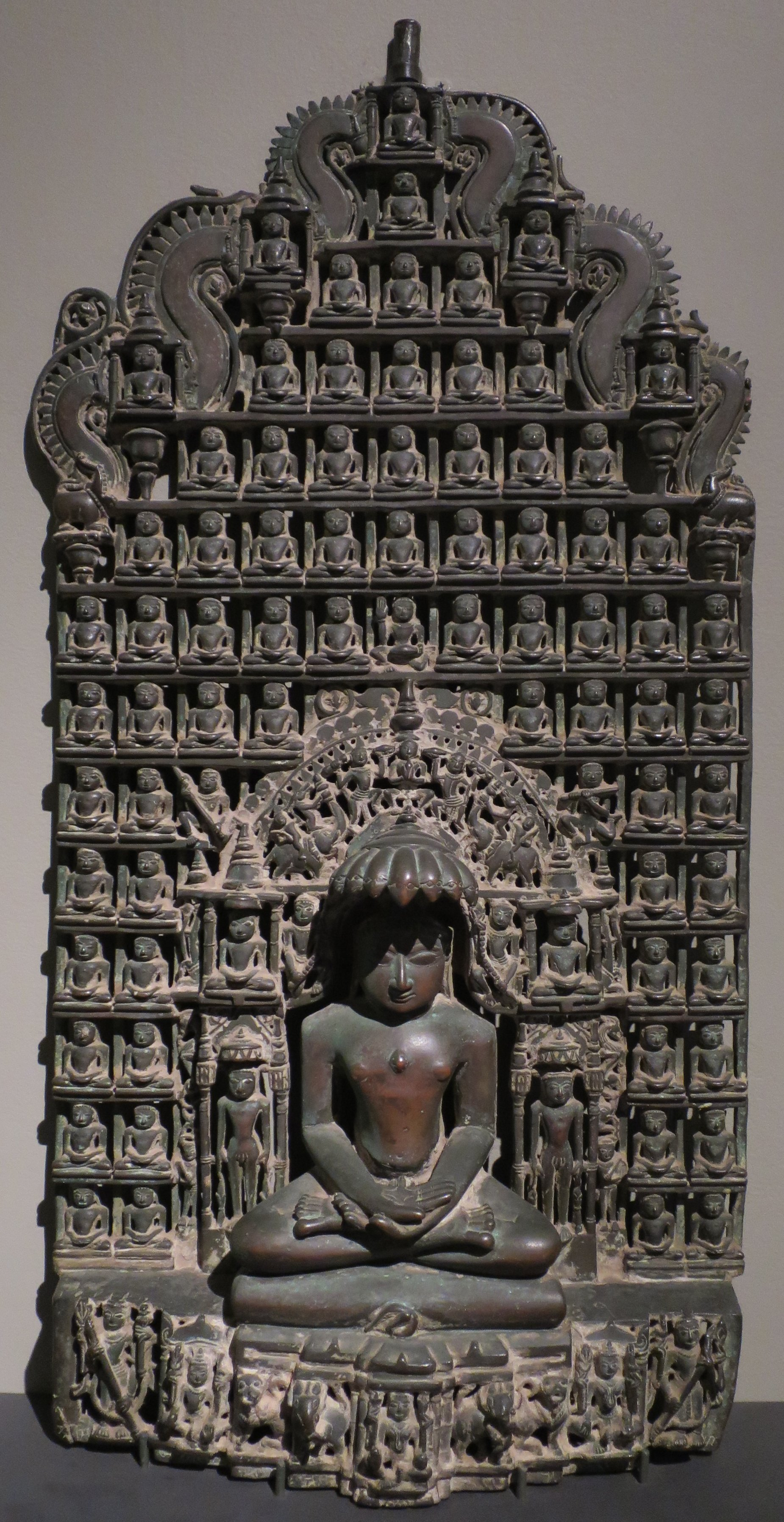
A metal sculpture of tirthaṅkaras of present, previous and next cosmic ages (72 in total)

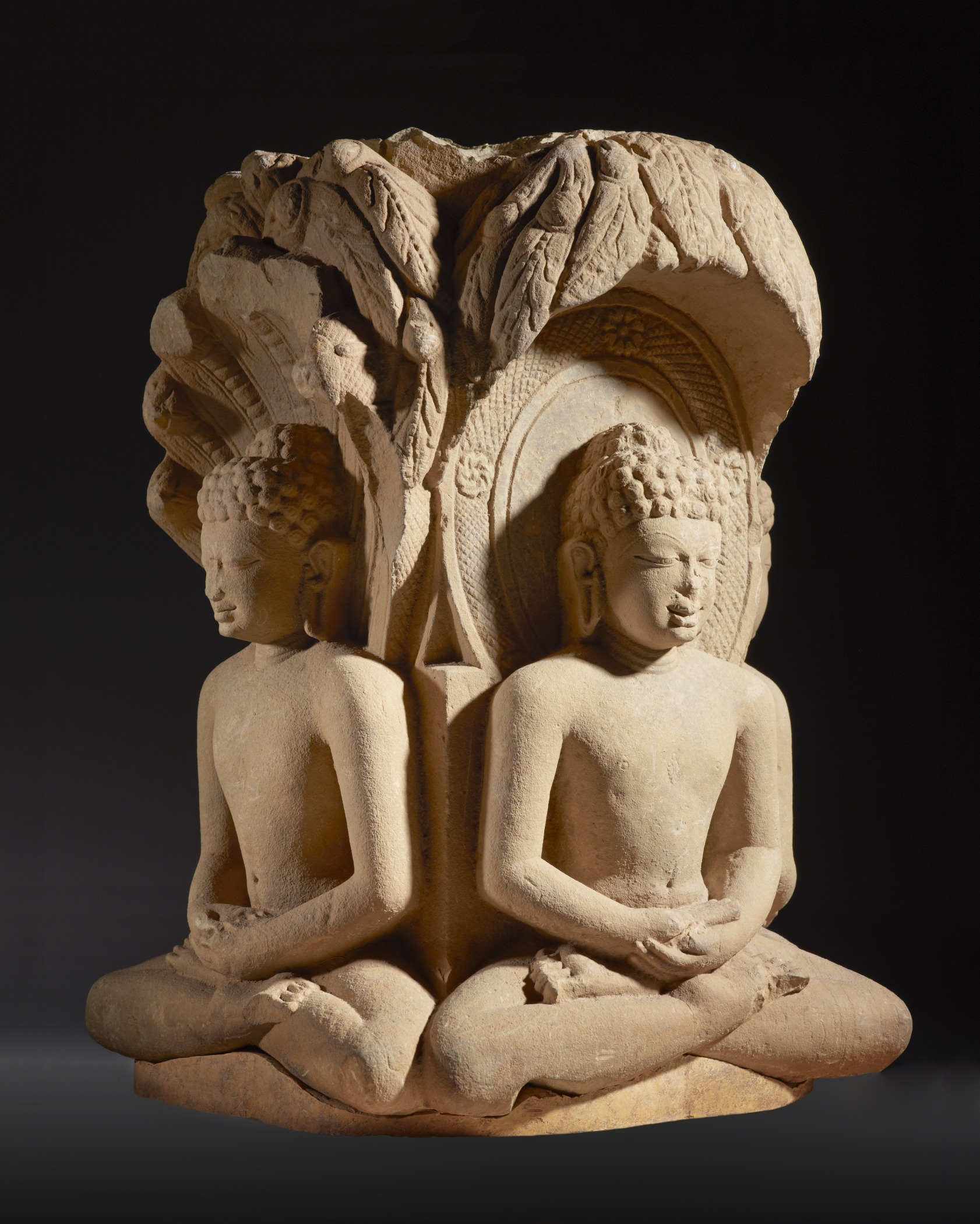
Jain chaumukha sculpture at LACMA, 6th century

In chronological order, the names, emblems and colours of the 24 tirthaṅkaras of this age are:

No.	Name	Emblem	Colour
1	Rishabhanatha (Adinatha)	Bull	Golden
2	Ajitanatha	Elephant	Golden
3	Sambhavanatha	Horse	Golden
4	Abhinandananatha	Monkey	Golden
5	Sumatinatha	Flamingo	Golden
6	Padmaprabha	Padma	Red
7	Suparshvanatha	Swastika	Green
8	Chandraprabha	Crescent Moon	White
9	Pushpadanta (Suvidhinath)	Crocodile or Makara	White
10	Shitalanatha	Kalpavriksha according to the Digambara. Srivatsa according to Svetambara	Golden
11	Shreyanasanatha	Rhinoceros	Golden
12	Vasupujya	Buffalo	Red
13	Vimalanatha	Boar	Golden
14	Anantanatha	Porcupine according to the Digambara; Falcon according to the Śvētāmbara	Golden
15	Dharmanatha	Vajra	Golden
16	Shantinatha	Antelope or deer	Golden
17	Kunthunatha	Goat	Golden
18	Aranatha	Nandavarta or fish	Golden
19	Māllīnātha	Kalasha	Blue
20	Munisuvrata	Tortoise	Black/Dark Blue
21	Naminatha	Blue lotus	Golden
22	Neminatha	Shankha	Black/Dark Blue
23	Parshvanatha	Snake	Green
24	Mahavira	Lion	Golden

=== Next cosmic age ===
The next 24 tirthaṅkaras, who will be born in utsarpinī age, are:

No.	Name	Previous human birth
1	Padmanabha	King Bimbisara
2	Surdev	Mahavira's uncle Suparshva
3	Suparshva	King Kaunik's son king Udayin
4	Svamprabh	The ascetic Pottil
5	Sarvanubhuti	Śrāvaka Dridhayadha
6	Devshruti	Kartik's Shreshti
7	Udaynath	Shravak Shamkha
8	Pedhalputra	Shravak Ananda
9	Pottil	Shravak Sunand
10	Shatak	Sharavak Shatak
11	Suvrat	Satyaki of Mahabharata
12	Amam	Krishna
13	Shrinishkashay	Satyaki Rudhra
14	Nishpulak	Krishna's brother Balbhadra also known as Balrama
15	Nirmam	Shravika Sulsa
16	Chitragupta	Krishna's brother's mother Rohini Devi
17	Samadhinath	Revati Gathapatni
18	Samvarnath	Sharavak Shattilak
19	Yashodhar	Rishi Dwipayan
20	Vijay	Karna of Mahabharata
21	Malladev	Nirgranthaputra or Mallanarada
22	Devachandra	Shravak Ambadh
23	Anantvirya	Shravak Amar
24	Bhadrakat	Swati

== Iconography and Art ==
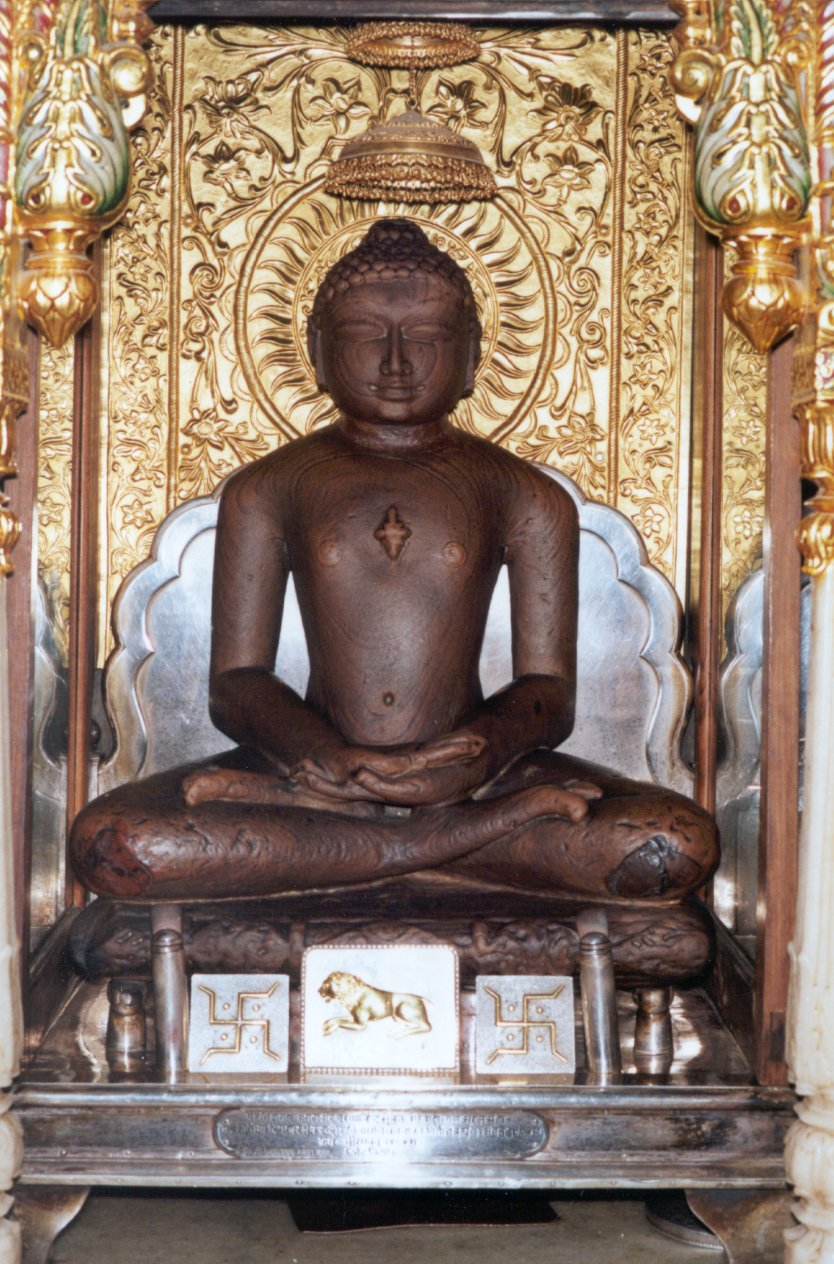
Mahāvīr Swami iconography at Shree Mahaveerji

A tīrthaṅkara is represented either in the lotus position (Padmasana) or in the meditation Khadgasana (Kayotsarga) posture. The latter, which is similar to the military standing at attention, is a difficult posture to hold for long and is preferred by Jains because it minimizes the amount of the body in contact with the earth, and thus the risk to sentient creatures living in or on it. If seated, they are usually depicted seated with their legs crossed in front, the toes of one foot resting upon the knee of the other leg, and the right hand lying over the left in the lap.

Tirthaṅkara images have no distinctive facial features, clothing, or (mostly) hairstyles, and are differentiated based on the symbol or emblem (Lanchhana) belonging to each tirthaṅkara except Parshvanatha. Statues of Parshvanatha have a snake crown. The first Tirthaṅkara, Rishabha, is identifiable by the locks of hair falling on his shoulders. Sometimes Suparshvanath is shown with a small snake-hood. The symbols are marked in the centre or the corner of the statue's pedestal. The Jain sects Digambara and Śvetāmbara have different depictions of idols. Digambara images are naked without any ornamentation, whereas Śvetāmbara ones are clothed and decorated with temporary ornaments. The images are often marked with Srivatsa on the chest and Tilaka on the forehead. Srivatsa is one of the ashtamangala (auspicious symbols), which sometimes resembles fleur-de-lis, an endless knot, a flower, or a diamond-shaped symbol.

The bodies of tirthaṅkara statues are exceptionally consistent throughout over 2,000 years of the historical record. The bodies are rather slight, with very wide shoulders and a narrow waist. Even more than is usual in Indian sculpture, the depiction takes relatively little interest in accurate depiction of musculature and bones but is interested in modeling outer surfaces as broad swelling forms. The ears are extremely elongated, alluding to the heavy earrings the figures wore in their early lives before they took the path to enlightenment, when most were wealthy, if not royal.

Sculptures with four heads are not uncommon in early sculpture, but unlike the comparable Hindu images, these represent four different tirthaṅkaras, not four aspects of the same deity. Multiple extra arms are avoided in tirthaṅkara images, though their attendants or guardians may have them.

== Temples and pilgrimage ==
=== Places of liberation ===
In Jain tradition, the geographical locations where the tirthankaras attained final liberation are considered the most sacred pilgrimage sites (tirthas). According to Jain texts, 20 of the 24 tirthankaras of the present cosmic age attained their final liberation on Mount Shikharji, located in the modern Indian state of Jharkhand.

The remaining four tirthankaras achieved nirvana at distinct geographical locations across the Indian subcontinent, each of which serves as a major regional temple and pilgrimage center. Rishabhanatha, the first tirthankara, attained liberation on Mount Ashtapada, traditionally identified as Mount Kailash. Vasupujya attained moksha in Champapuri, Bihar. Neminatha achieved final liberation on Mount Girnar in Gujarat. Mahavira, the 24th and final tirthankara, attained moksha at Pawapuri, located near modern-day Patna.

=== Places of birth ===
The birthplaces (janma kalyanaka) of the tirthankaras are venerated as major religious and historical sites. Ayodhya is revered as the birthplace of five tirthankaras, including the first tirthankara, Rishabhanatha. Varanasi is recognized as the birthplace of Parshvanatha, the 23rd tirthankara, alongside Suparshvanatha. Mahavira, the 24th tirthankara, was born in Kundagrama, traditionally located near the ancient city of Vaishali. Temple complexes and shrines have been established at these specific sites to commemorate their terrestrial lives.

=== Cave temples ===
Tirthankara iconography is prominent in early Indian rock-cut architecture. In Odisha, the Udayagiri and Khandagiri Caves date back to the 2nd century BCE and contain early Jain carvings and inscriptions. The Ellora Caves in Maharashtra feature extensive 9th-century rock-cut Jain monuments, including monumental tirthankara reliefs in the Indra Sabha cave. The Siddhachal Caves and Gopachal rock-cut monuments, situated within the Gwalior Fort in Madhya Pradesh, host colossal statues of Rishabhanatha and Parshvanatha carved directly into the rock face. In South India, the 9th-century reliefs at Tirunathar Kundru in Tamil Nadu prominently feature carved depictions of all 24 tirthankaras, illustrating the historical spread of Jain ascetic traditions.

=== Other temple complexes ===
Numerous structural temple complexes across India are exclusively dedicated to tirthaṅkara veneration. Significant architectural examples include the structural temple complex of Shree Mahaveerji and the Ajmer Jain temple in Rajasthan. The Dilwara Temples on Mount Abu and the Ranakpur Jain temple are renowned for their intricate marble architecture dedicated to Rishabhanatha and other tirthankaras. The Palitana temples on Shatrunjaya hill form one of the largest sacred temple cities in Jainism, containing hundreds of shrines focused on tirthankara worship.

== In other religions ==
The first Tirthaṅkara, Rishabhanatha is mentioned in Hindu texts like the Rigveda, Vishnupurana, and Bhagwata Purana. The Yajurveda mentions the name of three Tīrthaṅkaras: Ṛiṣhabha, Ajitnātha and Ariṣṭanemi. The Bhāgavata Purāṇa includes legends about the Tirthaṅkaras, particularly Rishabha. Yoga Vasishta, Chapter 15 of Vairagya Khanda, Sloka 8, gives the saying of Rama:

I am not Rama. I have no desire for material things. Like Jina I want to establish peace within myself.

Champat Rai Jain, a 20th-century Jain writer, claimed that the "Four and Twenty Elders" mentioned in the Book of Revelation (the final book of the Christian Bible) are "Twenty-four Tirthaṅkaras".

== See also ==
- God in Jainism
- Kundakunda
- List of Tirthaṅkaras
- Tattva (Jainism)
