= Jain units of time =

Measure of time as per Jain scriptures

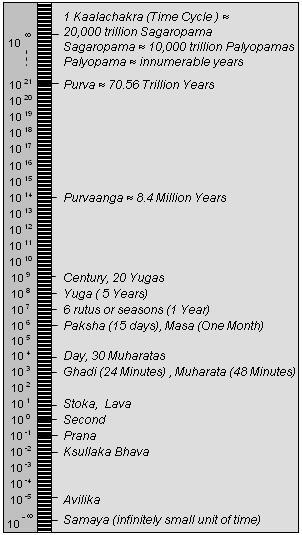

Jain units of time range from an infinitesimally small, indivisible measurement of time known as a samayā to innumerable lengths of time measured in sagaropama and palyopama years, including cycles of cosmic time (kalachakras) that repeat general events in Jain cosmology. Each cycle is divided into two eras of equal duration described as the avasarpini and the utsarpini. The former is a descending era in which virtue gradually decreases. The latter is an ascending era in which the reverse takes place. The present era is stated to be the former.

== Units ==
Unit	Definition	Value in SI units
samaya	base unit	—N/a
avalika	Innumerable samaya	≈ 171.66 μs
ghaṭi	8,388,608 avalika	≈ 1.44 ks (24 min)
muhūrta	16,777,216 avalika	≈ 2.88 ks (48 min)
ahorātram (sidereal day)	30 muhūrta	≈ 86.4 ks (24 h)
pakṣa (lunar fortnight)	15 days	≈ 1,296 ks
māsa (month)	30 ahorātram	≈ 2,592 ks (29.5 days)
ṛitu (season)	2 māsa	≈ 5,184 ks
(year)	6 ṛitus	≈ 31,104 ks (360 days)
yuga	5 years	≈ 155,520 ks
purvaanga		≈ 8.4 million years
purva	8.4 million purvaanga	≈ 70.56 trillion years
palyopama	Innumerable years	At least 10^{194} years (Note: Per Jain cosmology: Sirsapahelika, or 10^{194}, is the highest measurable number in Jainism. Higher than that is a palyopama (pit-measured years), explained by an analogy of a pit: a hollow pit of 8 x 8 x 8 miles tightly filled with hair particles of a seven-day-old newborn. [A single hair cut into eight pieces seven times results in 2,097,152 particles]. One particle is removed after every 100 years, the time taken to empty the whole pit = 1 palyopama. (1 palyopama = countless years.) Hence a palyopama is at least 10^{194} years. A sāgaropama is 10 quadrillion palyopamas, or more than 10^{210} years.)
sāgaropama	10 quadrillion palyopama	At least 10^{210} years
utsarpiṇī (ascending half-cycle)	1 quadrillion sāgaropama	At least 10^{225} years
avasarpiṇī (descending half-cycle)	1 quadrillion sāgaropama	At least 10^{225} years
kalachakra or kalpakāla (time cycle)	2 quadrillion sāgaropama	At least 2×10^{225} years

=== Division of the time cycle ===
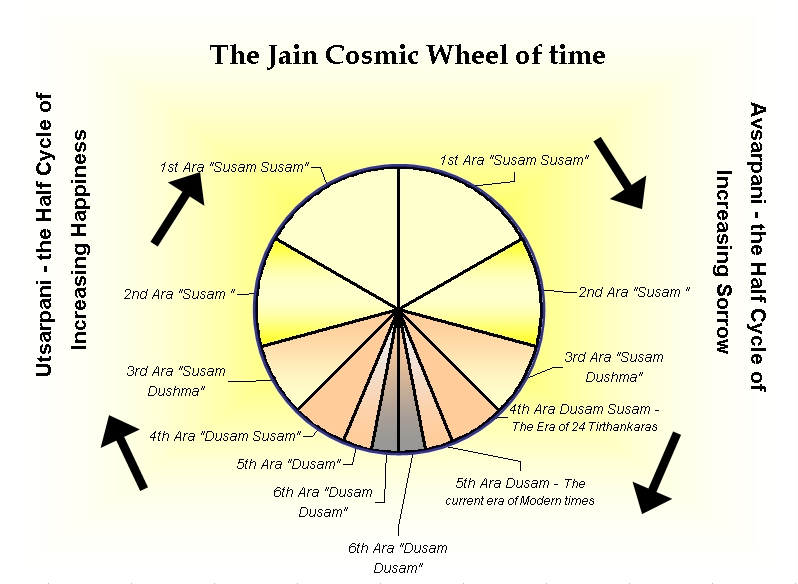

Current avasarpiṇī
Ara	Start (– End)	Length
suṣama-suṣamā	1 quadrillion sāgaropama years ago	400 trillion sāgaropama
suṣamā	600 trillion sāgaropama years ago	300 trillion sāgaropama
suṣama-duṣamā	300 trillion sāgaropama years ago	200 trillion sāgaropama
duṣama-suṣamā	100 trillion sāgaropama years ago	100 trillion sāgaropama minus 42,000 years
duṣama	525 BCE	21,000 years
duṣama-duṣama	20476 CE – 41476 CE	21,000 years

Note: In the utsarpiṇī, the six aras take place in reverse order.

== See also ==
- Ajiva
- Hindu units of time
- Kāla
- Kalachakra
