= Skanda =

Skanda may refer to:

- Kartikeya, or Skanda, the Hindu god of war
- Skanda Purana, a Hindu Purana (scripture) dedicated to the deity
- Skanda Upanishad, Hindu Upanishad
- Skanda (Buddhism), a Deva and/or Bodhisattva popular in Chinese Buddhism
- Skanda (actor) (born 1986), Indian actor
- Skanda (general) (fl. 12th century), Indian general
- Skanda (film), a 2023 Indian Telugu-language film
- Skanda Ashok, an Indian actor
- Skande, or Skanda, a village and fortress in Georgia
- Skandalove, Italian drag queen

== See also ==
- Skandha, in Buddhist phenomenology and soteriology, the five "aggregates" that give rise to craving and clinging
- Skandha (Jainism), in Jain phenomenology and soteriology, the matter "aggregate", the only kind of aggregate admitted
