= Triyancha =

Term for plants and animals in Jain philosophy

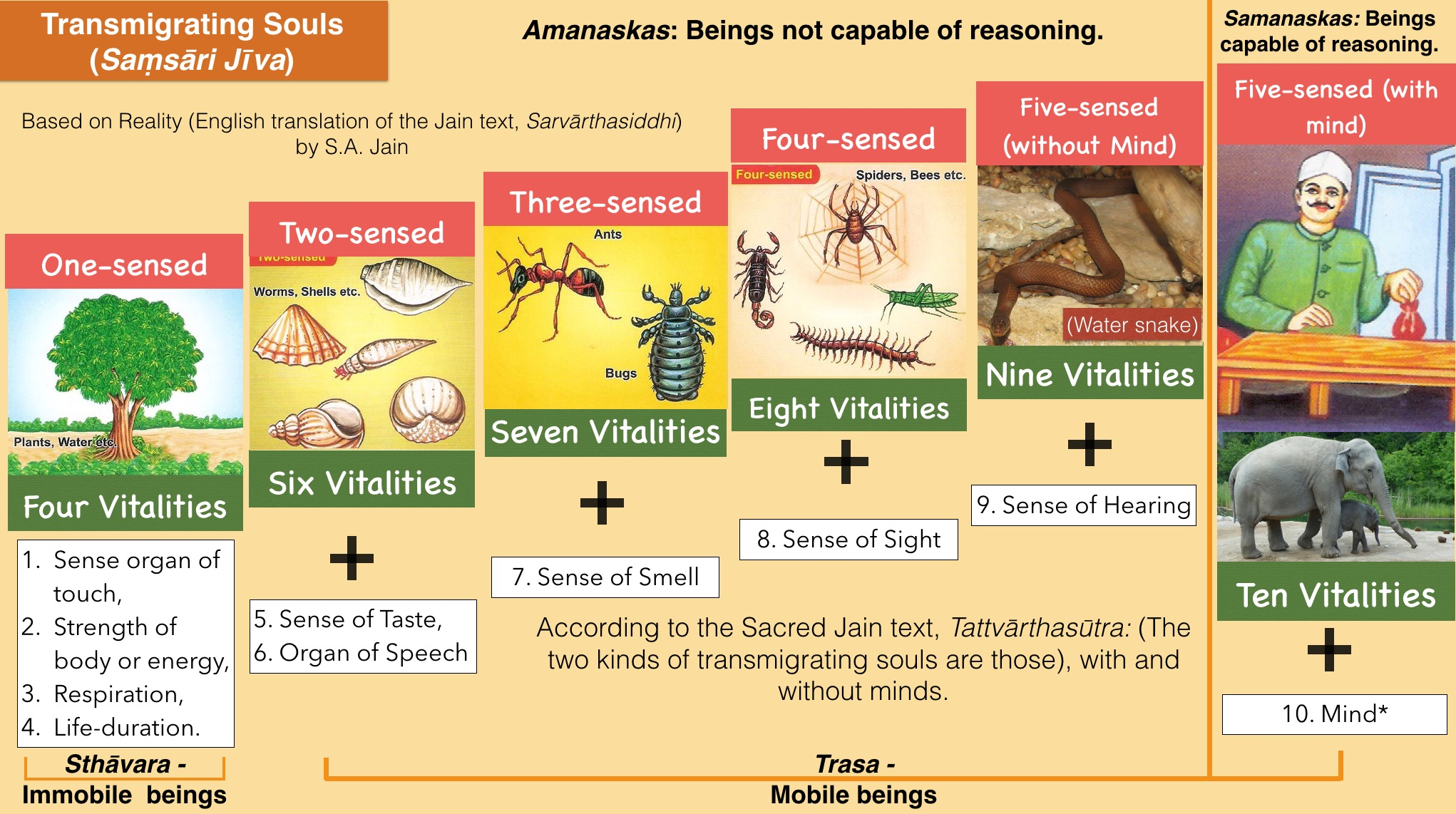
Classification of saṃsāri-jīvas (transmigrating souls) in Jainism. All except human beings are called tiryañca.

Tiryañca (तिर्यञ्च), or tiryancha or tiryagyoni, is the term used for the realm of plants, animals (including insects), and microscopic and atomic organisms in Jain philosophy. Beings who inhabit this gati (state of existence) are categorised as existing in a lower form of life, unable to differentiate right from wrong, and (for some individuals like birds and reptiles) are only capable of observing the most basic forms of self-restraint.

Jīvas (souls) undergoing a rise in nāma-karma (sub-human karma) are bound to be born in the tiryañca realm. Macroscopic (plant and animal) lifeforms in this gati have different lifespans depending on the choices they’ve made in their past lives, ranging anywhere between three palyopama (innumerable) years to a singular antarmuhūrta (undefined short moment in time, usually several minutes). Microscopic lifeforms have shorter lifespans when compared to other tiryañca, existing for only minuscule fractions of a second before passing on to the next life.

Lifeforms within tiryañca are often oblivious of the happenings of the outer world. Several sub-groups of the tiryañca-gati exist, each containing innumerable entities, including the nigoda (the lowest of these sub-groups), the kāyika (whose bodies assume form in the natural elements), and plants (vanaspati-kāya) and animals proper. Many lower tiryañca beings, along with some plant species, assume consciousness inside the colonies of other small beings.

== Characteristics ==
Beings in the tiryañca-gati can heavily differ from one another in terms of their senses, instinct, and region. Plants and animals can have anywhere from one to five senses, and may be born with or without a mind that can think rationally; the nigoda can posses only the sense of touch. Some beings take birth in Karmabhumija (the land of action), while others assume form in Bhogbhumija (the land of enjoyment). All tiryañca-jīvas endure some form of suffering regardless of their birth circumstance, including mass slaughter, predation, and spiritual compromise.
