= Skandha (Jainism) =

Skandha (Sanskrit) means "heaps, aggregates, collections, groupings". In the religion of Jainism, Skandha is a combination of Paramanus (elementary particles). In contrast to Buddhism that allows aggregates of non-matters, Jainism allows only aggregation between matter (only first type out of the five types of aggregates allowed in Buddhism). Jainism doesn't include the last four types of aggregates of Buddhism because those phenomena are explained in Jainism by the groupings between matter (karma particles, second last from the list below) and Atman (unified individual whose existence is denied in Buddhism). A grouping between matter and Atman is not considered a Skandha but is considered a Bandha (bondage).

Each Paramanu has "intensity points" of aridness or cohesiveness that, because of transformation, can increase or decrease between one and infinity. These Paramanus can combine with each other to create Skandhas or Aggregates when there is a difference of two "intensity points", whether it is arid or cohesive or whether having even or odd "intensity points" except the minimum (one) "intensity point". For example, a paramanu with two points of cohesiveness can combine with a paramanu of four points of cohesiveness or aridness; and that of three points with that of five points and so on. This definition is given in Pravachanasara.

Skandhas and Paramanus are two types of Pudgalas (Matter).

Skandha are of six types: Gross-gross, gross, gross-fine, fine-gross, fine, and fine-fine. This classification is given in Niyamsara.

1. Gross-gross: Solids, such as stone and wood, that when broken cannot be united again by themselves.
2. Gross: Milk, water, etc. separated but can unite without any help.
3. Gross-fine: The sunlight, shade, moon light, darkness etc. One is not able to split them. One is not able to grab them with his hands.
4. Fine-gross: The objects of the four senses of touch, taste, smell, and hearing are even though are known by skin, tongue, nose and ears but still cannot be perceived by eyes and that is why they are fine-gross in nature.
5. Fine: The matter particles of the karma are fine in nature and cannot be perceived by any of the physical senses.
6. Fine-fine: Finer than the karma particles are extremely fine in nature. They are finer than karma particles.
