= Nigoda =

Realm of cosmology in the Jain religion

Nigoda is a term used in Jain cosmology to denote the lowest forms of invisible life in the universe. Life-forms existent within the nigoda realm reside in endless numbers, having no hope of attaining moksha (liberation) through self-effort. Jain scriptures describe the nigoda as microorganisms living in large clusters, having a very short life span, and as pervading each and every part of universe, even in the tissues of plants and animals. Nigoda have only one sense, touch, and are in constant contrast to Siddhashila (top of the universe), the ultimate abode where liberated souls exist in omnisciencent and eternal bliss. According to Jain tradition, it is said that when a human being either attains liberation or is born within the nigoda realm due to karma, another from the nigoda is given the potential of self-effort and hope. Nigoda belong to the lowest class of jīva (soul).

== Characteristics ==
The life in Nigoda is that of a sub-microscopic organism possessing only one sense, i.e., of touch.
