= Pudgala =

One of the six Dravyas in Jainism

Pudgala (or Sanskrit: पुद्गल) is a word used in Indian philosophies. In Jainism, Pudgala (matter) is one of the six dravyas, or aspects of reality that fabricate the world we live in.

== Etymology ==
Pudgala is derived from the words 'pud', which is defined as Supplement (Addition /Fusion), and gala, which is defined as Disintegrate, or Division or Fission. Therefore, Pudgalas are best defined as all things that are continuously changing by the process of Supplementation or Disintegration, namely matter.

== Jain philosophy ==
Dravyas as per Jain philosophy.

In Jain philosophy, Pudgala or Pudgalāstikāya is one of the six dravyas. These include jiva (living) and the fivefold divisions of ajiva (non-living) category:pudgala (matter), dharma (motion), adharma (rest), akasha (space), and kala (time). Pudgala, like other dravyas except kala is called astikaya in the sense that it occupies space. The individual unit of Pudgala is the material from which all is made called a Paramanu, which, by the process of supplementation, can combine to form what can be roughly said is an aggregate, called a Skandha. It possesses at all times four qualities, namely, a color (varna), a taste (rasa), a smell (gandha), and a certain kind of palpability (sparsha, touch).

== Buddhist philosophy ==
In Buddhism, Pudgala means the entity that reincarnates as an individual or person, i.e., the bundle of tendencies that keeps an individual reincarnating until they attain enlightenment.

Within Buddhism, the orthodox teaching is that an enduring self does not exist. One problem that this view faces is the question of how there is continuity between this life and the next life. Another issue is that the virtue of compassion for others appears to depend on understanding that there exists others to be liberated.

Responding to such problems, a school within Buddhism known as the Pudgalavādin school, which was for a time dominant in India, held that there is a self that is reborn and attains nirvana. The school believed that only by accepting a self does the Buddha's teachings about rebirth and liberation withstand scrutiny. This view was seen by other Buddhists as contradicting what they believed to be Buddha's main teaching of non-self. The school uses the analogy of fire and fuel to describe the self. Just as fire is not the same as fuel but cannot exist without it, the self is not the same as the body and other aggregates but cannot exist without them. To their critics, this understanding of the self seemed paradoxical because it is described as neither identical with nor distinct from the aggregates.

== See also ==
- Tattva (Jainism)
- Dravya (Jainism)
- Ajiva
- Pudgalavada
- Pancha Bhuta
