= Dravya =

Concept in Jainism

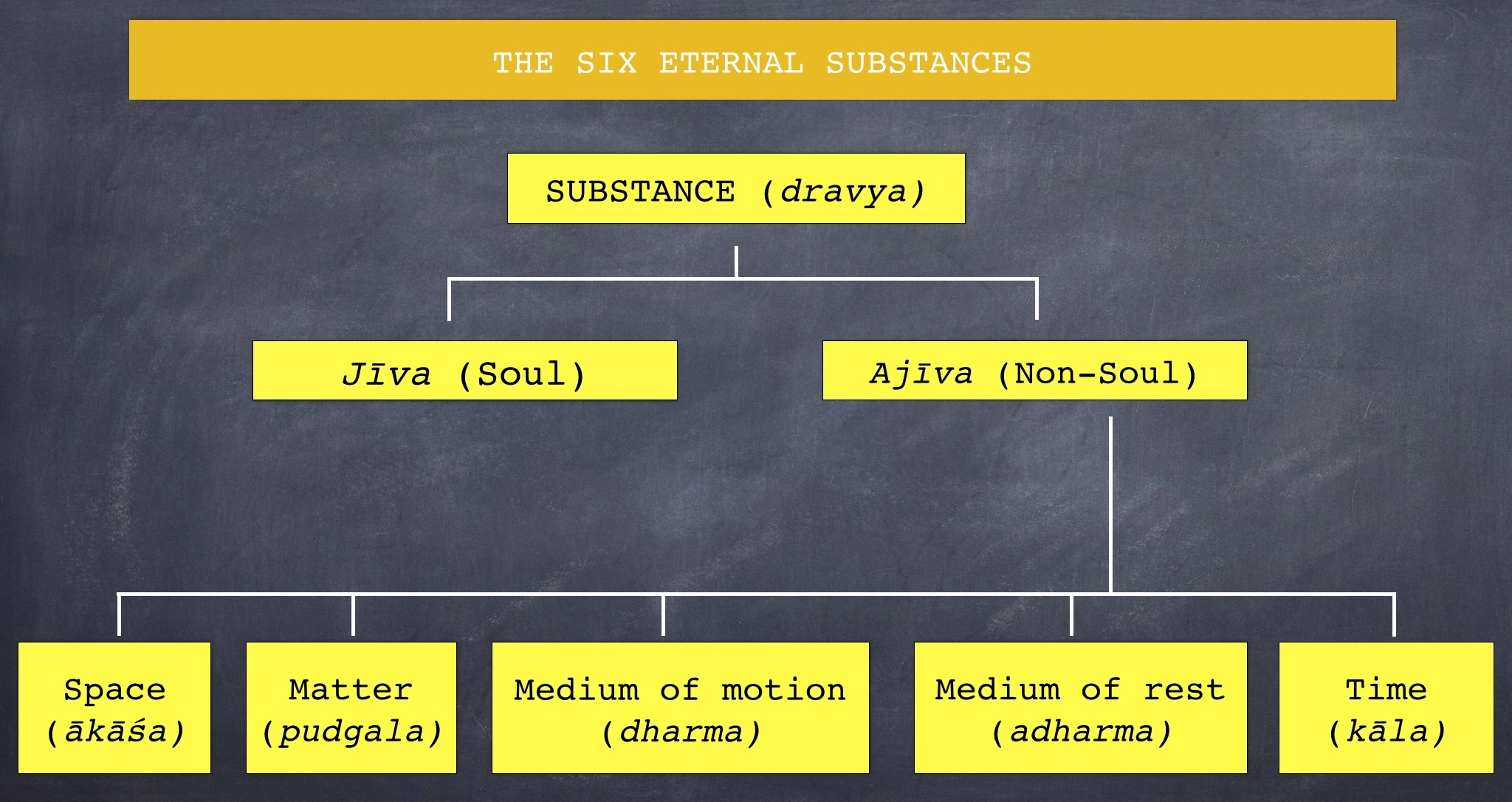
Classification of the six eternal substances

Dravya (Sanskrit: द्रव्य) means substance or entity. According to the Jain philosophy, the universe is made up of six eternal substances: sentient beings or souls (jīva), non-sentient substance or matter (pudgala), principle of motion (dharma), the principle of rest (adharma), space (ākāśa) and time (kāla). The latter five are united as the ajiva (the non-living). As per the Sanskrit etymology, dravya means substances or entity, but it may also mean real or fundamental categories.

Jain philosophers distinguish a substance from a body, or thing, by declaring the former as a simple element or reality while the latter as a compound of one or more substances or atoms. They claim that there can be a partial or total destruction of a body or thing, but no dravya can ever be destroyed. The Vaisheshika school of Indian philosophy also deals with a concept of dravya.

== Classification and importance in Jainism ==
Chart showing the classification of dravya and astikaya

Dravya in Jainism are fundamental entities, called astikaya (literally, 'collection that exists'). They are believed to be eternal, and the ontological building blocks that constitute and explain all existence, whether perceived or not.

Both Śvētāmbara and Digambara traditions hold that there are six dravyas which can be categorized into sentient and non-sentient:

1. Sentient
  1. soul (jiva),
2. Non-sentient
  1. matter (pudgala),
  2. space (akasha),
  3. motion (dharma),
  4. rest (adharma),
  5. and time (kala). (Note: The ontological categories and definition of dharma as motion, and adharma as rest, is unique to Jainism among Indian religions. However, like other Indian religions, dharma also means "moral virtue" in Jainism, while adharma also means "immorality, unethical behavior".)

In both traditions, the substance of space is conceptualized as "world space" (lokakasha) and "non-world space" (alokiakasha). Further, both soul and matter are considered active ontological substances, while the rest are inactive.

Out of the six dravyas, five except time have been described as astikayas, that is, extensions or conglomerates. Since like conglomerates, they have numerous space points, they are described as astikaya. There are innumerable space points in the sentient substance and in the media of motion and rest, and infinite ones in space; in matter they are threefold (i.e. numerable, innumerable and infinite). Time has only one; therefore it is not a conglomerate. Hence the corresponding conglomerates or extensions are called—jivastikaya (soul extension or conglomerate), pudgalastikaya (matter conglomerate), dharmastikaya (motion conglomerate), adharmastikaya (rest conglomerate) and akastikaya (space conglomerates). Together they are called pancastikaya or the five astikayas.

== Jīva (living entity) ==
Jiva means "soul" in Jainism, and is also called jivatman. It is a core concept and the fundamental focus of the Jain theology. The soul is believed to be eternal, and a substance that undergoes constant modifications, in every life, after every rebirth of a living being. Jiva consists of pure consciousness in the Jain thought, has innate "free will" that causes it to act but is believed to be intangible and formless. It is the soul that experiences existence and gains knowledge, not mind nor body both believed to a heap of matter. Jain philosophy further believes that the soul is the mechanism of rebirth and karma accumulation. It is the same size in all living beings, such as a human being, a tiny insect and a large elephant. Jiva is everywhere, filling and infused in every minuscule part of the entire loka (realm of existence), according to Jainism. The soul has the potential to reach omniscience and eternal bliss, and end the cycles of rebirth and associated suffering, which is the goal of Jain spirituality.

According to Jain philosophy, this universe consists of infinite jivas or souls that are uncreated and always existing. There are two main categories of souls: un-liberated mundane embodied souls that are still subject to transmigration and rebirths in this samsara due to karmic bondage and the liberated souls that are free from birth and death. All souls are intrinsically pure but are found in bondage with karma since beginning-less time. A soul has to make efforts to eradicate the karmas attain its true and pure form.

10th-century Jain monk Nemichandra describes the soul in Dravyasamgraha:

The sentient substance (soul) is characterized by the function of understanding, is incorporeal, performs actions (doer), is co-extensive with its own body. It is the enjoyer (of its actions), located in the world of rebirth (samsara) (or) emancipated (moksa) (and) has the intrinsic movement upwards.

— Dravyasaṃgraha (2)

The qualities of the soul are chetana (consciousness) and upyoga (knowledge and perception). Though the soul experiences both birth and death, it is neither really destroyed nor created. Decay and origin refer respectively to the disappearing of one state and appearing of another state and these are merely the modes of the soul. Thus Jiva with its attributes and modes, roaming in samsara (universe), may lose its particular form and assume a new one. Again this form may be lost and the original acquired.

Jivas are believed to be of two types: stationary and mobile. Illustration of the former are plants, while moving jivas include examples such as human beings, animals, gods, hell beings and insects. Jivas are further classified in Jain philosophy by an assigned number of senses which range from one to five sensory organs. Inert world such as air, fire or clod of dirt, considered non-sensate in contemporary science, are asserted in historic texts of Jainism to be living and with sensory powers.

== Ajiva (five non-living entities) ==
The jiva is believed to rely on other dravya to function. The Jain philosophy completely separates body (matter) from the soul (consciousness). Souls reside in bodies and journey endlessly through saṃsāra (that is, realms of existence through cycles of rebirths and redeaths). Ajiva consists of everything other than jiva. Life processes such as breath means of knowledge such as language, all emotional and biological experiences such as pleasure and pain are all believed in Jainism to be made of pudgala (matter). These interact with tattva or reality to create, bind, destroy or unbind karma particles to the soul. According to Dundas, Dharma as a metaphysical substance in Jain philosophy may be understood as "that which carries" instead of the literal sense of ordinary physical motion. Thus, dharma includes all verbal and mental activity that contributes to karma and purification of the soul.

=== Pudgala (Matter) ===
Matter is classified as solid, liquid, gaseous, energy, fine Karmic materials and extra-fine matter i.e. ultimate particles. Paramāṇu or ultimate particle (atoms or sub-atomic particles) is the basic building block of all matter. It possesses at all times four qualities, namely, a color (varna), a taste (rasa), a smell (gandha), and a certain kind of palpability (sparsha, touch). One of the qualities of the paramāṇu and pudgala is that of permanence and indestructibility. It combines and changes its modes but its basic qualities remain the same. It cannot be created nor destroyed and the total amount of matter in the universe remains the same.

=== Dharmastikaay ===
Dharmastikaay means the principles of Motion that pervade the entire universe. Dharmastikaay and Adharmastikaay are by themselves not motion or rest but mediate motion and rest in other bodies. Without Dharmastikaay motion is not possible. The medium of motion helps matter and the sentient that are prone to motion to move, like water (helps) fish. However, it does not set in motion those that do not move.

=== Adharmastikaay ===
Without adharmastikaay, rest and stability is not possible in the universe. The principle of rest helps matter and the sentient that are liable to stay without moving, like the shade helps travellers. It does not stabilize those that move. According to Champat Rai Jain:

The necessity of Adharmastikaay as the accompanying cause of rest, that is, of cessation of motion will be clearly perceived by any one who will put to himself the question, how jīvas and bodies of matter support themselves when coming to rest from a state of motion. Obviously gravitation will not do, for that is concerned with the determination of the direction which a moving body may take...

=== Ākāśa (space) ===
Space is a substance that accommodates the living souls, the matter, the principle of motion, the principle of rest and time. It is all-pervading, infinite and made of infinite space-points.

=== Kāla (time) ===
Kāla is a real entity according to Jainism and is said to be the cause of continuity and succession. Champat Rai Jain in his book The Key of Knowledge wrote:

...As a substance which assists other things in performing their 'temporal' gyrations, Time can be conceived only in the form of whirling posts. That these whirling posts, as we have called the units of Time, cannot, in any manner, be conceived as parts of the substances that revolve around them, is obvious from the fact that they are necessary for the continuance of all other substances, including souls and atoms of matter which are simple ultimate units, and cannot be imagined as carrying a pin each to revolve upon. Time must, therefore, be considered as a separate substance which assists other substances and things in their movements of continuity.

— Champat Rai Jain

Jaina philosophers call the substance of Time as Niścay Time to distinguish it from vyavhāra (practical) Time which is a measure of duration—hours, days and the like.

== Attributes of Dravya ==
These substances have some common attributes or gunas such as:

- Astitva (existence): indestructibility; permanence; the capacity by which a substance cannot be destroyed.
- Vastutva (functionality): capacity by which a substance has function.
- Dravyatva (changeability): capacity by which it is always changing in modifications.
- Prameyatva (knowability): capacity by which it is known by someone, or of being the subject-matter of knowledge.
- Agurulaghutva (individuality): capacity by which one attribute or substance does not become another and the substance does not lose the attributes whose grouping forms the substance itself.
- Pradeshatva (spatiality): capacity of having some kind of location in space.

There are some specific attributes that distinguish the dravyas from each other:

- Chetanatva (consciousness) and amurtavta (immateriality) are common attributes of the class of substances soul or jiva.
- Achetanatva (non-consciousness) and murtatva (materiality) are attributes of matter.
- Achetanatva (non-consciousness) and amurtavta (immateriality) are common to Motion, Rest, Time and Space.

== See also ==
- Tattva
- Dravyasamgraha — 10th-century Jain text
