= Avasarpiṇī =

Time cycle in Jain cosmology

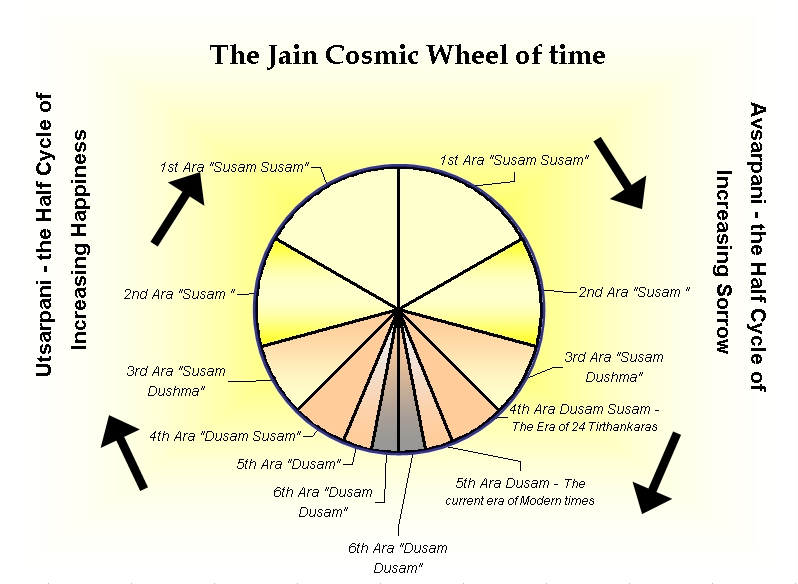

Avasarpiṇī (Sanskrit: अवसर्पिणी) is the descending half of the cosmic time cycle in Jainism and the one in which the world is said to be at present. According to Jain texts, it is marked by a decline in goodness and religion. The ascending half of the cycle is called Utsarpiṇī, which is marked by the ascent of goodness and religion.

== Overview ==
Jaina cosmology divides the worldly cycle of time (kalpakāla) into two parts or half-cycles (kāla) – ascending (utsarpiṇī) and descending (avasarpiṇī) – each consisting of 10 x 1 crore x 1 crore addhāsāgaropama (10 kotikotī, or 10^{15} [1 quadrillion] sāgaropama). Thus, one cycle of time (kalpakāla) is equivalent to 20 kotikotī (2 quadrillion) sāgaropama. A sāgaropam is further divided into 10 quadrillion palyopama, and a palyopam is defined as an innumerable amount of years.

During the ascending period (utsarpiṇī) of the half-cycle, living beings in the regions of Bharata and Airāvata experience increased longevity, strength, stature and happiness, whereas deterioration occurs during the descending period (avasarpiṇī). Each half-cycle is further divided into six periods of time. The periods in the descending (avasarpiṇī) half-cycle are termed:

1. susamā-susamā, of 4 kotikotī (400 trillion) sāgaropama
2. susamā, of 3 kotikotī (300 trillion) sāgaropama
3. susamā-dusamā, of 2 kotikotī (200 trillion) sāgaropama
4. dusamā-susamā, of 1 kotikotī (100 trillion) sāgaropama minus 42,000 years
5. dusamā, of 21,000 years
6. dusamā-dusamā, of 21,000 years

== Six periods of time ==
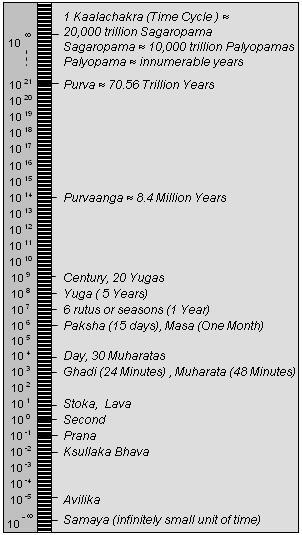
Jaina units of time on a logarithmic scale

=== Suṣama-suṣamā (read as Sukhma-sukhma) ===
During the first period of the Avasarpiṇī, people lived for three palyopama years. During this ara (era or period) people were on average six miles tall. They took their food on every fourth day; they were very tall and devoid of anger, pride, deceit, greed and other sinful acts. Various kinds of the kalpavriksha fulfilled their wishes and needs, such as for food, clothing, homes, entertainment, and jewels.

=== Suṣamā (read as Sukhma) ===
During the second period, people lived for two palyopama years. During this ara, people were on average 4 miles tall. They took their food at an interval of three days, but the kalpavriksha supplied their wants less so than before. The land and water became less sweet and fruitful than they were during the first ara.

=== Suṣama-duḥṣamā (read as Sukhma-dukhma) ===
During the third period, the maximum lifespan of the people was reduced to one palyopama year, and the people were on average 2 miles tall. They took their food on every second day. The earth and water, as well as height and strength of the body, went on decreasing, and they became less than they were during the second ara.

In the first three ara, the children were born as twins, one male and one female, who married each other and once again gave birth to twins. On account of happiness and pleasures, the religion, renunciation and austerities were not possible. At the end of the third ara, the wish-fulfilling trees stopped giving the desired fruits, and people started living in societies.

The first Tirthankara, Rishabhanatha, was born at the end of this period. He taught the people the skills of farming, commerce, defence, politics and arts (in total 72 arts for men and 64 arts for women) and organised the people into societies. That is why he is known as the father of human civilisation.

=== Duḥṣama-suṣamā (read as Dukhma-sukhma) ===
The fourth period was the age of religion, where renunciation, austerity and liberation were possible. The 63 Śalākāpuruṣas, or the illustrious persons who promote the Jain religion, regularly appear in this ara. The remaining 23 Tīrthaṅkars, including Māhavīra, appeared in this ara.

=== Duṣama (read as Dukhma) ===
The fifth period is generally called Panchama Kāla. According to Jain texts, we are presently living in this period of time which started after 3 years and 8 1/2 months of the liberation (nirvāṇa) of the 24th Tīrthankara Mahāvīra. This period began in 525 BCE and will end in the year 20,476 CE. As of 2026, exactly 2,550 years have elapsed and 18,450 years are still left.

It is an age of sorrow and misery in which people are six feet tall on average and live for no more than 125 years. No liberation is possible, although people practice religion in lax and diluted forms. By the end of this ara, even the Jain religion will disappear, only to appear again with the advent of the first tirthankara in the next cycle.

Bharata Chakravartin is said to have seen 16 dreams which were related to this period. These were explained by Tirthankara Rishabhanātha.

=== Duṣama-duṣama (read as Dukhma-dukhma) ===
The sixth period will be the age of intense misery and sorrow, making it impossible to practice religion in any form. The age, height and strength of the human beings will decrease to a great extent. In this era, people will live for no more than 16–20 years. This trend will start reversing at the onset of utsarpiṇī kāl.

== See also ==
- Jain cosmology
- Jain units of time
