= Deva (Jainism) =

Term used for heavenly beings in Jainism

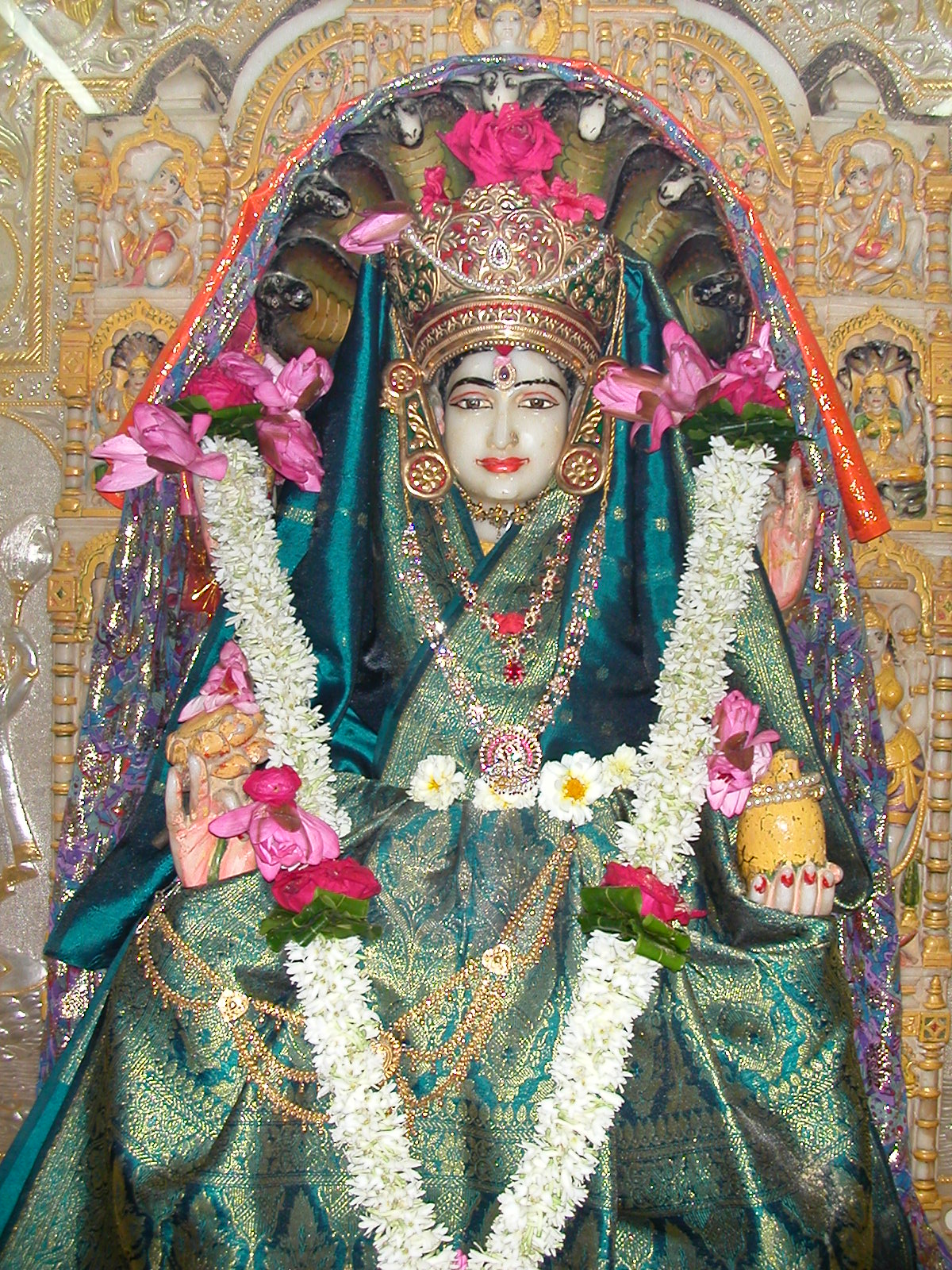
Idol of Padmāvatī devī, śāsanadevī of Lord Parshvanatha at Walkeshwar Temple. She is one of the most popular demi-goddesses amongst the Jains. Worship of such persons is considered as mithyātva or wrong belief and many Jains unknowingly get involved in such worship.

The Sanskrit word Deva has multiple meanings in Jainism. In many places the word has been used to refer to the Tirthankaras (spiritual teachers of Dharma). But in common usage it is used to refer to the heavenly beings. These beings are born instantaneously in special beds without any parents just like hell beings (naraki). According to Jain texts, clairvoyance (avadhi jnana) based on birth is possessed by the celestial beings.

== Classes of heavenly beings ==
According to Jain texts, the celestial beings are of four orders (classes):-

- Bhavanavāsī (residential)
- Vyantara (intermediaries or peripatetic)
- Jyotiṣka (luminaries or stellar)
- Vaimānika (Astral or heavenly beings)

There are of ten, eight, five and twelve classes up to the Heavenly beings (kalpavasis). There are ten grades in each of these classes of celestial beings, the Lord (Indra), his Equal, the Minister, the courtiers, the bodyguards, the police, the army, the citizens, the servants, and the menials.

== Abode ==
The abode of Devas is Svarga (heaven). According to Jain texts, persons with right faith (except those whose bondage of life-karma has been accomplished prior to their attainment of right belief) are reborn among the fourth order of devas and not among the three lower orders, namely the Residential, the Peripatetic and the Stellar devas. Those practising restraint with attachment and restraint-cum-non-restraint are also characterized by right belief. Hence they are reborn in the higher heavens of Saudharma Kalpa and so on and not among the three lower orders of celestial beings. Merit which leads to the highest celestial state such as Sarvārthasiddhi is said to be acquired in the Bharata, Airāvata, and Videha Kshetra

== Lifetime ==
1. The minimum lifetime of the Residential devas is ten thousand years. 2. That of Peripatetic devas is a little over one palyopama. 3. The minimum lifetime of Stellar devas is the same as for Peripatetic devas.

== See also ==
- Jain cosmology
- Shanthi Matha Vasavi
