= Dharma in Jainism =

Jain philosophical concept

Jain texts assign a wide range of meaning to the Sanskrit dharma or Prakrit dhamma. It is often translated as “religion” and as such, Jainism is called Jain Dharma by its adherents.

In Jainism, the word "Dharma" is used to refer the following: religion; dharmastikaay (the principle of motion) as a dravya (substance or a reality); the true nature of a thing; and ten virtues like forgiveness, etc., also called ten forms of dharma.

The Tirthankaras are believed to be the supreme teachers of the Jain Dharma. These teachings are understood to ford a passage across Samsara.

== Religion ==
Usage of the word "dharma" in reference to the religion include:

=== Ahimsa as Dharma ===
According to Jain texts, Ahimsa is the greatest dharma (अहिंसा परमॊ धर्मः [ahiṃsā paramo dharmaḥ]: "non-violence is the highest religion") and there is no religion equal to the religion of non-violence.

=== Dharma bhāvanā ===
Jain texts prescribe meditation on twelve forms of reflection (bhāvanā) for those who wish to stop the influx of karmas that extend transmigration. One such reflection is Dharma bhāvanā:

The faith promulgated by Jina is characterized by non- injury, based on truth, with humility as its root, forbearance as its strength, safeguarded by celibacy, dominated by quietism and characterized by restraint and non-attachment as its support. Without attaining it living beings have been wandering in the beginningless mundane existence, undergoing sufferings and misery owing to the rise of inauspicious karmas. If true faith is attained, one is bound to achieve emancipation, after enjoying several kinds of worldly prosperity and distinction. This is contemplating what is stressed in religion. This promotes constant devotion to religion. (12)

=== Conduct ===
In Jainism, the dharma (conduct or path) of the householder (Śrāvaka) is distinguished from the conduct of an ascetic. Sravaka-dharma is the religious path for the virtuous householders, where charity and worship are the primary duties. The dharma of a householders consists of observance of twelve vows i.e. five minor vows and seven disciplinary vows. Sramana-dharma is the religious path of the virtuous ascetics, where meditation and study of scriptures is their primary duty. The religion of monks consists of five Mahavratas or great vows. They are endowed with right faith, right knowledge and right conduct and engaged in complete self-restraint and penances.

== As svabhāv (nature) of a substance ==
According to Jainism, the universe and its constituents are uncreated and everlasting. These constituents behave according to the natural laws and their nature (svabhaav) without interference from external entities. Dharma or true religion according to Jainism is vatthu sahāvo dhammo translated as "the intrinsic nature of a substance is its true dharma."

== Dharmastikāy dravya (the substance) ==
Dharmastikaay is one of the six substances constituting the universe. These substances are – Dharmastikaay (medium of motion), Adharmastikaay (medium of rest), Akāsa (space), kāla (time), Pudgala (matter) and Jiva (soul). Since Dharmastikaay as a substance extends and pervades entire universe, it is known as Dharm-astikaya. It helps the matter and souls in movement. It itself is not motion, but is a medium of motion. Adharmastikaay is opposite of Dharmastikaay i.e. it assists the substances like soul and matter to rest.

== Samyaktva - rationality of perception, knowledge and conduct ==
According to Jainism, samyak darshana (rational perception), samyak jnana (rational knowledge) and samyak caritra (rational conduct) collectively also known as ratnatraya or the "three jewels of Jainism" constitute the path to liberation.

Samyak darsana or rational perception is the rational faith in the true nature of every substances of the universe. Samyak Jnana or rational knowledge is the right knowledge of true and relevant knowledge of the reality, the tattvas. It incorporates the two principles of anekantvada or non-absolutism and syadvada or relativity of truth. Right knowledge must be free from three main defects: doubt, delusion, and indefiniteness. Samyak caritra or rational conduct is the natural conduct of a (soul) living being. It consists in following austerities, engaging in right activities and observance of vows, carefulness and controls.

== Ten virtues as dharma ==
According to the Jain text, Tattvarthsutra, the following are the ten virtues (dasha-dharma):

1. Supreme forgiveness
2. Supreme humility
3. Supreme straightforwardness
4. Supreme truthfulness
5. Supreme purity
6. Supreme self-restraint
7. Supreme penance
8. Supreme renunciation
9. Supreme non-possessiveness
10. Supreme celibacy
