= Jīva (Jainism) =

Soul in Jainism

Jīva (Sanskrit: जीव) or Atman is a philosophical term used within Jainism to identify the soul. As per Jain cosmology, jīva is the principle of sentience and is one of the tattvas or one of the fundamental substances forming part of the universe. The jiva, according to Jainism, is an essential part of how the process of karma, rebirth and the process of liberation from rebirth works.

== Place in Jain Metaphysics ==
Everything in existence is divided into two independent, everlasting, co-existing and uncreated categories called the jiva (soul) and the ajiva (Sanskrit: अजीव non-soul). This basic premise of Jainism makes it a dualistic philosophy.

Jains regard soul as one of the six fundamental and eternal substances (dravyas) which forms the universe. The two states of soul substance are — svābhva (pure or natural) and vibhāva (impure or unnatural state). Souls in transmigration are in impure state and liberated ones are said to be in natural or pure state. The soul is considered to be eternal and sentient. The liberated soul has four qualities: infinite joy, infinite energy, infinite consciousness, and infinite knowledge. A bound soul suffers because it is not aware of its true nature of ultimate bliss and omniscience. Souls are not material, but expand or shrink to the size of the body.

Jain philosophy is the oldest Indian philosophy that completely separates matter from the soul.

According to the Jain text, Samayasāra:

Know that the Jiva (soul) which rests on pure faith, knowledge, and conduct, alone is the Real Self. The one which is conditioned by the karmic matter is to be known as the impure self. – Verse 1-2-2

According to Vijay Jain, the souls which rest on the pure self are called the Real Self, and only arihant and Siddhas are the Real Self.

== Rebirth ==
According to Jain philosophy, the soul undergoes rebirth. Depending on the karmic particles attached to a soul, Jain theology states a being is reborn in one of four gatis (states of existence), namely, heavenly being (deva), human (manushya), hell being (naraki) and animals and plants (triyancha). Besides this there also exist a sub-microscopic life form, Nigoda, possessing only one sense, i.e., of touch.

The Jaina theosophy, like ancient Ajivika, but unlike Hindu and Buddhist theosophies, asserts that each soul passes through 8,400,000 birth-situations, as they circle through Saṃsāra. As the soul cycles, states Padmanabh Jaini, Jainism traditions believe that it goes through five types of bodies: earth bodies, water bodies, fire bodies, air bodies and vegetable lives. With all human and non-human activities, such as rainfall, agriculture, eating and even breathing, minuscule living beings are taking birth or dying, their souls are believed to be constantly changing bodies. Perturbing, harming or killing any life form, including any human being, is considered a sin in Jainism, with negative karmic effects.

== Liberation ==
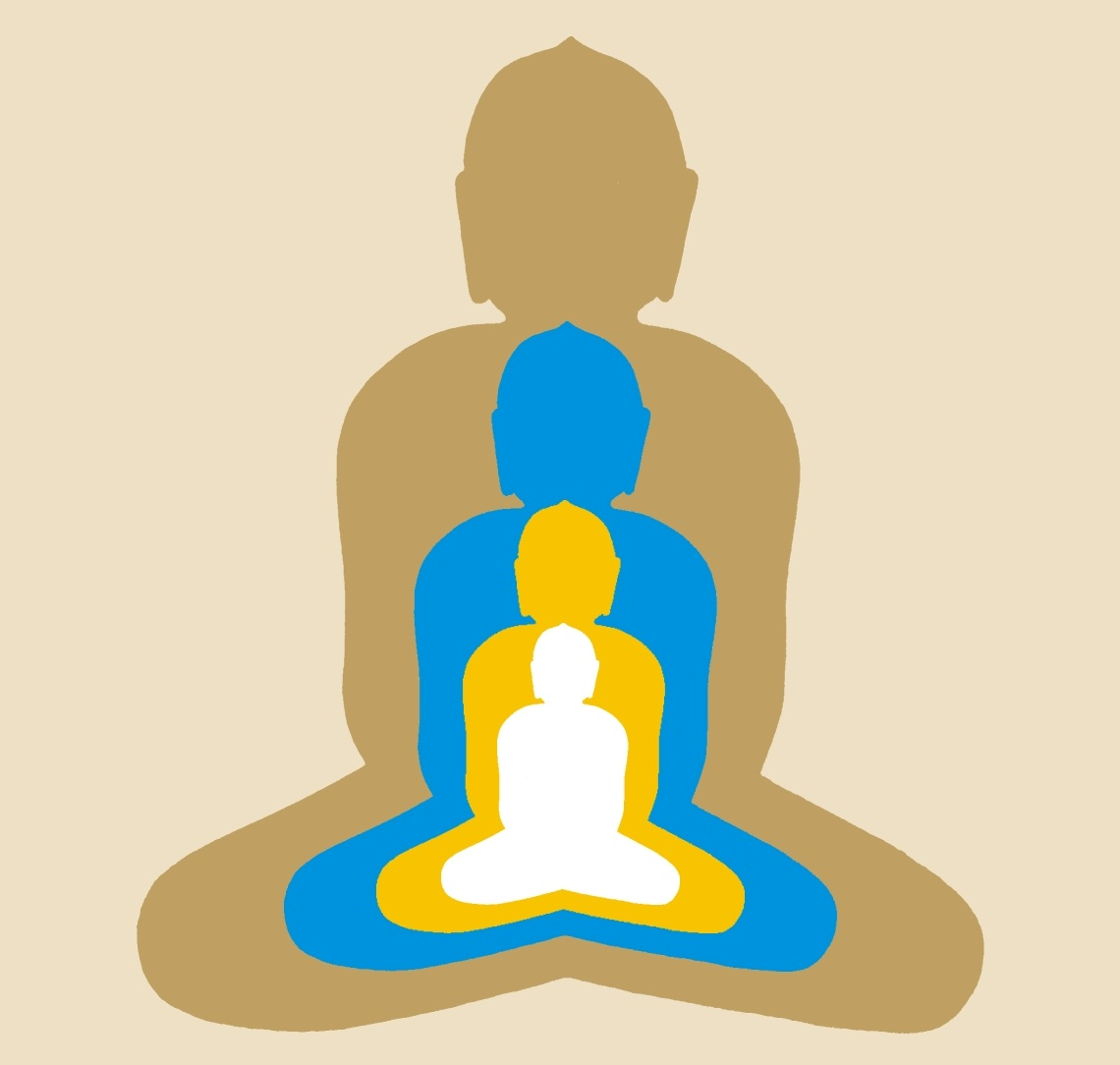
Depiction of the concept of soul (in transmigration) in Jainism. Golden color represents nokarma – the quasi-karmic matter, Cyan color depicts dravya karma– the subtle karmic matter, orange represents the bhav karma– the psycho-physical karmic matter and White depicts sudhatma, the pure consciousness.

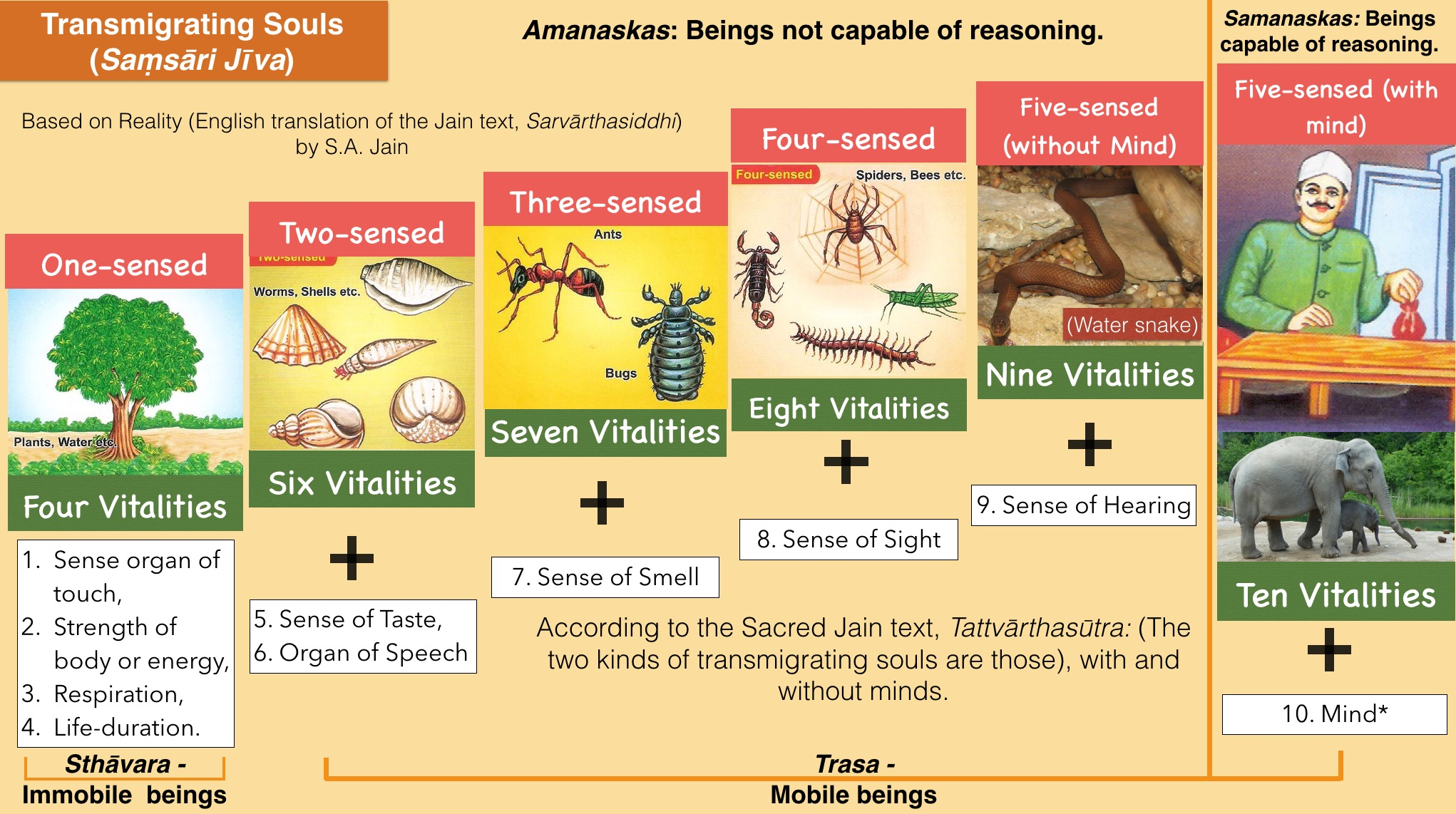
Classification of Saṃsāri Jīvas (Transmigrating Souls) as per Jainism.

The five vows of Jain practice are believed in Jainism to aid in freeing the jīva from karmic matter, reduce negative karmic effects and accrue positive karmic benefits.

In Jain beliefs, souls begin their journey in a primordial state, and exist in a state of consciousness continuum that is constantly evolving through Saṃsāra. Some evolve to a higher state, some regress asserts the Jaina theory, a movement that is driven by the karma. Further, Jaina traditions believe that there exist Abhavya (incapable), or a class of souls that can never attain moksha (liberation). The Abhavya state of soul is entered after an intentional and shockingly evil act. Jainism considers souls as pluralistic each in a karma-samsara cycle, and does not subscribe to Advaita style nondualism of Hinduism, or Advaya style nondualism of Buddhism.

A liberated soul in Jainism is one who has gone beyond Saṃsāra, is at the apex, is omniscient, remains there eternally, and is known as a Siddha. A male human being is considered closest to the apex with the potential to achieve liberation, particularly through asceticism. Women must gain karmic merit, to be reborn as man, and only then can they achieve spiritual liberation in Jainism, particularly in the Digambara sect of Jainism; however, this view has been historically debated within Jainism and different Jaina sects have expressed different views, particularly the Shvetambara sect that believes that women too can achieve liberation from Saṃsāra.

In contrast to Buddhist texts which do not expressly or unambiguously condemn injuring or killing plants and minor life forms, Jaina texts do. Jainism considers it a bad karma to injure plants and minor life forms with negative impact on a soul's Saṃsāra. However, some texts in Buddhism and Hinduism do caution a person from injuring all life forms, including plants and seeds.

== Stages of spiritual development ==
Jain texts explain that there are fourteen stages of spiritual development called Gunasthana. These are:

1. Mithyadristi: The stage of wrong believer
2. Sasādana: downfall from right faith
3. Misradrsti: mixed right and wrong belief
4. Avirata samyagdrsti: vowless right belief
5. Deśavirata: The stage of partial self-control
6. Pramattasamyata: Slightly imperfect vows
7. Apramatta samyata: Perfect vows
8. Apūrvakaraņa: New thought-activity
9. Anivāttibādara-sāmparāya: advanced thought-activity (Passions are still occurring)
10. Sukshma samparaya: slightest delusion
11. Upaśānta-kasaya: subsided delusion
12. Ksīna kasāya: destroyed delusion
13. Sayogi kevali: Omniscience with vibration
14. Ayogi kevali: The stage of omniscience without any activity

== Classification ==
According to Jainism, sentient beings are ranked based on their senses. Four basic elements, viz. earth, water, air and fire ranks among the lowest in them.

== See also ==
- Atma Siddhi
- Atman (Buddhism)
- Atman (Hinduism)
- God in Jainism
- Ratnatraya - Three Jewels of Jainism
