= Adharma =

Sanskrit antonym of dharma

Adharma is the Sanskrit antonym of dharma. It means "that which is not in accord with the dharma". Connotations include betrayal, discord, disharmony, unnaturalness, wrongness, evil, immorality, unrighteousness, wickedness, and vice.

Adharma (Sanskrit: अधर्म) is derived from combining "a" with "dharma", which literally implies "not-dharma". It means immoral, sinful, wrong, wicked, unjust, unbalanced, or unnatural.

According to Bhagavata Purana's verse 6.1.40, the Yamaduta replied: the religious principles prescribed in the Vedas constitute Dharma, and those not prescribed constitute Adharma.

Ariel Glucklich translates Adharma as chaos, disorder, non-harmonious and explains it as opposite of Dharma. Glucklich states that adharma isn't the binary opposite of Dharma or absolutely unethical in Indian philosophy. Rather it is a complex functional subjective term just like dharma, with shades of meaning, that depends on circumstances, purpose and context.

Gene F. Collins Jr. defines Adharma as irreligiosity. Gene states that it is anything contrary to the laws of existence. According to him, they are those actions which are contrary to one's Dharma. Whatever facilitates spiritual growth is Dharma, and whatever impedes spiritual growth is Adharma. Following an Adharmic path means acting on three vices, which are, pride, contact, and intoxication. According to him, blind faith without regard for spiritual understanding is Adharma. Following the path of Adharma can result in a bad future.

== Lineage ==
The Vishnu Purana recites a Hindu legend that includes Dharma and Adharma as mythical characters, and it is loaded with symbolism about virtues and vices, morality and ethics. The lineage is as follows,

The progeny of Dharma by the daughters of Dakṣa were as follows: by Śraddhā (faith) he had Kāma (desire); by Lakṣmī (prosperity), Darpa (pride); by Dhṛti (steadiness), Niyama (precept); by Tuṣṭi (resignation), Santoṣa (content); by Puṣṭi (thriving), Lobha (cupidity); by Medhā (intelligence), Śruta (sacred tradition); by Kriyā (action, devotion), Daṇḍa, Naya, and Vinaya (correction, polity, and prudence); by Buddhi (intellect), Bodha (understanding); by Lajjā (modesty), Vinaya (good behaviour); by Vapu (body), Vyavasāya (perseverance). Śānti (expiation) gave birth to Kṣema (prosperity); Siddhi (perfection) to Sukha (enjoyment); and Kīrtti (fame) to Yaśa (reputation). These were the sons of Dharma; one of whom, Kāma, had Herṣa (joy) by his wife Nandi (delight).
The wife of Adharma (vice) was Hiṃsā (violence), on whom he begot a son Anṛta (or "Anrita") (falsehood), and a daughter Nikṛti (immorality): they intermarried, and had two sons, Bhaya (fear) and Naraka (hell); and twins to them, two daughters, Māyā (deceit) and Vedanā (torture), who became their wives. The son of Bhaya and Māyā was the destroyer of living creatures, or Mṛtyu (death); and Duḥkha (pain) was the offspring of Naraka and Vedanā. The children of Mṛtyu were Vyādhi (disease), Jarā (decay), Soka (sorrow), Tṛṣṇa (greediness), and Krodha (wrath). These are all called the inflictors of misery, and are characterised as the progeny of Vice (Adharma). They are all without wives, without posterity, without the faculty to procreate; they are the terrific forms of Viṣṇu, and perpetually operate as causes of the destruction of this world. On the contrary, Dakṣa and the other Ṛṣis, the elders of mankind, tend perpetually to influence its renovation: whilst the Manus and their sons, the heroes endowed with mighty power, and treading in the path of truth, as constantly contribute to its preservation.

— Vishnu Purana, Chapter 7, Translated by Horace Hayman Wilson

== See also ==
- Anrita
