= Siddhashila =

Apex of the universe in Jain cosmology

Siddhashila as per the Jain cosmology

Siddhashila is an area in Jain cosmology at the apex of the universe, which is where the Jains believe people who have become arihants and tirthankaras go after they die and attain moksha. Such people are called siddhas after they discard their mortal body, hence the origin of the term.

== See also ==
- Kevala jnana
- Jainism and non-creationism
- Timeline of Jainism
