= Pattavali =

Record of a spiritual lineage of heads of monastic orders

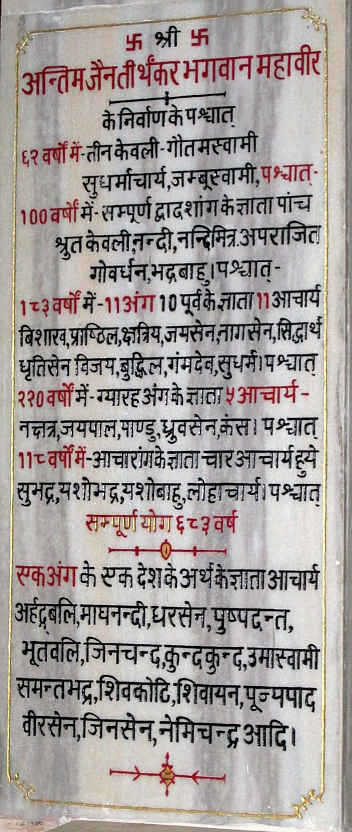
Stela: Bhadrabahu as the last Kevalin in Digambara tradition

A Pattavali (From Sanskrit patta: seat, avali: chain), Sthaviravali or Theravali, is a record of a spiritual lineage of heads of monastic orders. They are thus spiritual genealogies. It is generally presumed that two successive names are teacher and pupil. The term is applicable for all Indian religions, but is generally used for Jain monastic orders.

There are several famous pattavalis which are often used to establish historical chronologies:

- Sarasvatigachchha Pattavali: Pattavali of the Balatkara Gana of Mula Sangh
- Tapagaccha Pattavali: Pattavali of Tapa Gachchha
- Upkeśa Gaccha Pattavali: Pattavali of the Upkeśa Gaccha (now extinct), the oldest of all pattavalis of the Jain sangha.
- Kharataragachha Pattavali: Pattavali of Kharatara Gachchha

Glasenapp notes that although the chronological list mentioned in pattavali are valuable, it is not reliable.

== Description ==
Pattavali states the lineage of Jain monks.

== The Jain Monastic Lineages ==
According to 600 AD inscription at Sravanabelagola, Harivansha Purana, Jambuddvita Pannati and Kalpasutra, the Pattavali (lineage) after Mahavira, 24th tirthankara, until Bhadrabāhu is commonly recognized by both the sects without disputes. Differences arise from Sthulabhadra onwards, whose undisputed adherence to the Śvetāmbara is confirmed. Kalpasutra gives a lineage starting with Pushyagiri after Vajrasena ending with Devardhi Ksamashramana, the president of the Vallabhi council under whom the principal canonical scriptures of the Śvetāmbara sect were formally written. The Kalpasutra also mentions ganas and shakhas established by other disciples of Bhadrabahu, Sambhutavijaya, Mahagiri etc. The Brihat-Kharataragachchha pattavali gives the name of Chandra after Vajrasena, the lineage continues until Udyotana, the founder of Brihadgachcha.

Apart from the given list, another list of preceptors of the Upkeśa Gaccha (now extinct) within the Śvetāmbara sect exists. While all other pattavalis trace their ancestry to the 24th Tirthankara Mahavira, Upkeśa Gaccha traces its ancestry to the 23rd Tirthankara Parshvanatha. This pattavali, therefore, also supports the claim of the antiquity of the Śvetāmbara sect. Several eminent preceptors including Acharya Ratnaprabhasuri (founder of Oswal clan) and Acharya Swayamprabhasuri (founder of Porwal clan) belonged to the Upkeśa Gaccha.

- The Kevalis (those who attained kavalagyana)
  - Mahavira Swami
  - Gautam Swami
  - Sudharmaswami (Lohacharya)
  - Jambu Swami
- The Shruta Kevalis (who knew the complete oral texts) According to Digambara tradition:
  - Vishnudeva
  - Aparajita
  - Govardhana
  - Bhadrabahu
- The Shruta Kevalis (who knew the complete oral texts) According to Śvetāmbara tradition:
  - Prabhava
  - Sayyambhava
  - Yashobhadra
  - Sambhutavijaya
  - Bhadrabahu

== Digambara Lineage ==
According to Digambar tradition, the monastic lineage after Bhadrabāhu was:

- Bhadrabahu, a shruta-kevalin
- Visakha, the 10-purvis begin here
- Prosthila
- Kshatria
- Jayasena
- Nagasena
- Siddhartha
- Dhritisena
- Vijaya
- Buddhilinga
- Deva I
- Dharasena
- Nakshatri, 11 angis begin here.
- Jayapalka
- Pandava
- Dhruvasena
- Kansa
- Subhadra, 1 angis begins here.
- Yashobhadra
- Bhadrabahu II
- Lohacarya II
- Arhadvali, ekangis with partial knowledge of one anga.
- Maghanandi
- Dharasena, see Satkhandagama
- Pushpadanta
- Bhutabali

Arhadvali is said to have been the founder of the divisions of the Mula Sangha. Even though the Digambara sect claims Manatunga was a Digambara monk, none of the pattavalis maintained by the Digambara sect mention him.

== Śvetāmbara Lineage ==
According to the Śvetāmbara tradition, the monastic lineage is as follows: -

1. Sudharmaswami
2. Jambu Swami
3. Prabhava
4. Sayyambhava
5. Yashobhadra
6. Sambhutavijaya & Bhadrabahu
7. Sthulabhadra
8. Mahagiri (268 BC to 168 BC) and Suhastin (222 BC to 122 BC)
9. Susthita and Supratibuddh
10. Indradinna
11. Dinna
12. Sinhagiri
13. Vajraswami (31 BC to 47 CE)
14. Vajrasena
15. Chandrasuri
16. Vriddhadeva
17. Pradyotansuri
18. Mandevsuri
19. Mantungsuri - author of Bhaktāmara Stotra
20. Virsuri
21. Jaidevsuri
22. Anandsuri
23. Vikramsuri
24. Narsimhsuriji
25. Samudrasuri
26. Mandevsuri II
27. Vibudhprabhasuri
28. Jayanandsuri
29. Raviprabhsuri
30. Yashodevsuri
31. Pradyumnasuri
32. Mandevsuri III
33. Vimalchandrasuri
34. Udyotansuri
35. Sarvadevsuri
36. Devsuri
37. Sarvadevsuri II
38. Yashobhadrasuri
39. Munichandrasuri
40. Vadidevsuri
41. Vijaisinghsuri
42. Somaprabhsuri
43. Jagatchandrasuri - Founder of Tapagaccha
44. Devendrasuri
45. Vidyanandsuri and Dharmagoshsuri
46. Somaprabhsuri
47. Somatilaksuri
48. Devsundersuri
49. Somasundersuri
50. Munisundersuri
51. Ratnashekharsuri
52. Lakshmisagarsuri
53. Sumatisadhusuri
54. Hemvimalsuri
55. Anandvimalsuri
56. Vijay Dansuri
57. Vijay Hirsuri - One who inspired Akbar
58. Vijaysen Suri
59. Vijaydev suri
60. Vijaysimhsuri
61. Vijayprabhavsuri
62. Satyavijay Gani

Another list of monks, of the preceptors of the Upkeśa Gaccha also exists and is considered to be an important pattavali as the creation of major Śvetāmbara clans such as Oswal, Porwal, and Srimal are connected to Upkeśa Gaccha.

== See also ==
- Upkeśa Gaccha
- Religious order
- Gaccha
