= Acharya (Jainism) =

Head of an order of ascetics

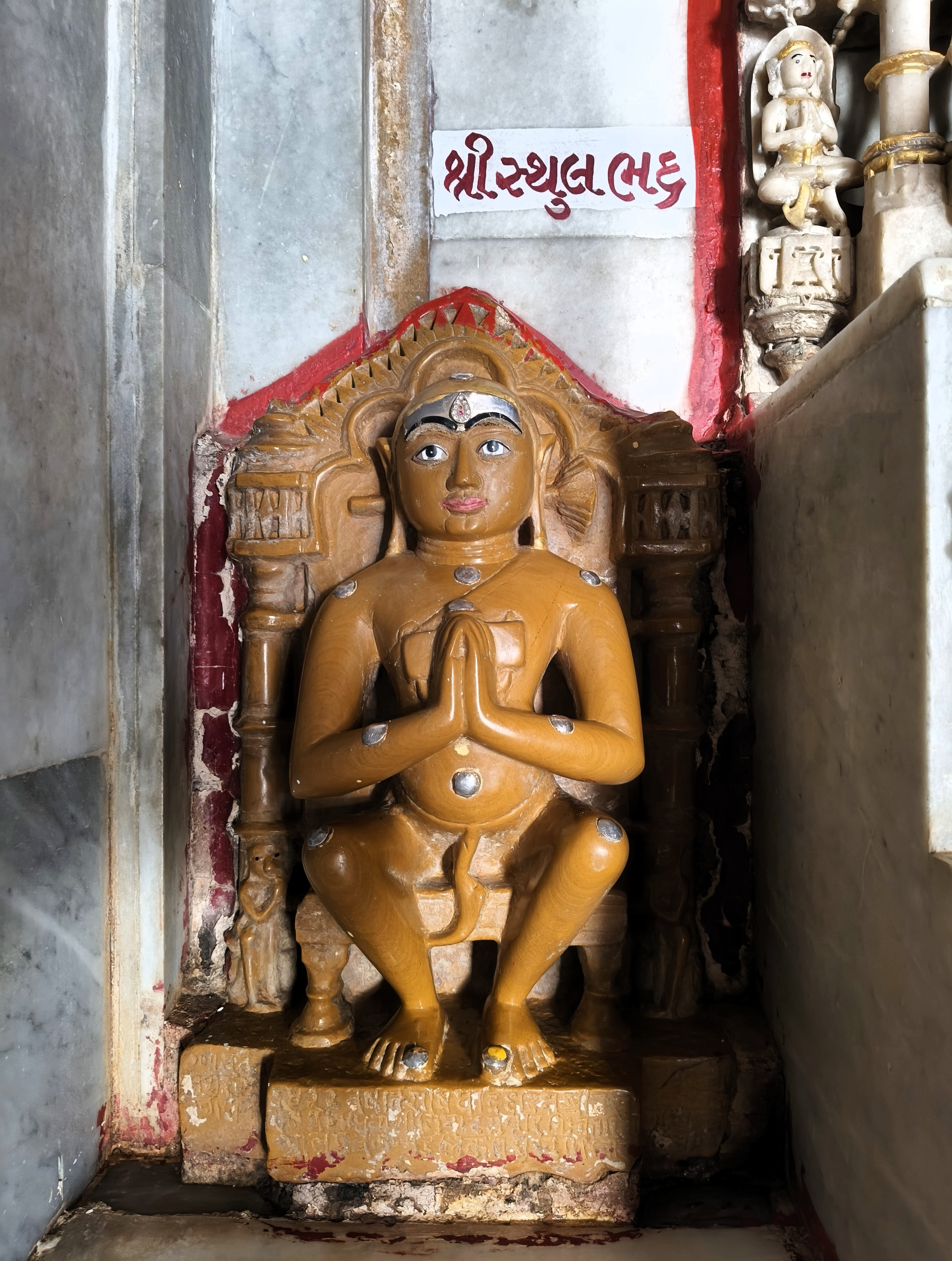
14th century Ārya Sthūlabhadra idol at the Khaḍākhoṭadī no Pāḍo Jaina Temple at Patan

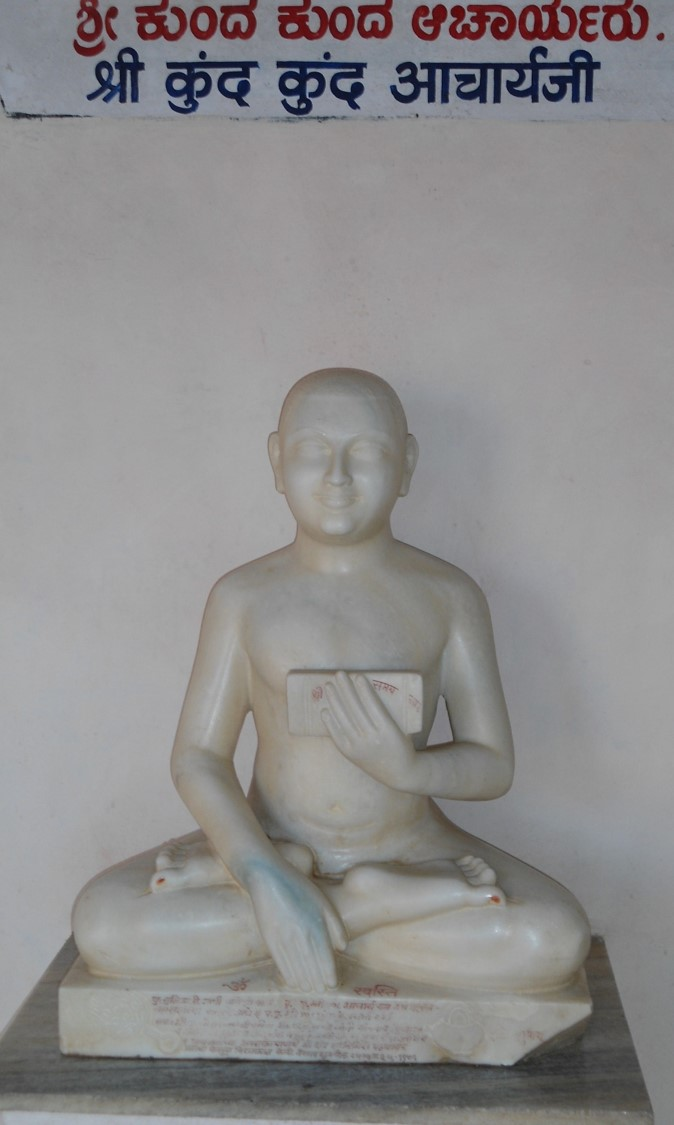
Image of Ācārya Kundakunda (author of Pancastikayasara, Niyamasara)

An Ācārya (Ācārya) is the leader of an order of Jain ascetics (Munis), termed a sangh in the Jain tradition. Some of the famous achāryas are Bhadrabahu, Sthulibhadra, Kundakunda, Samantabhadra, Umaswati, Haribhadra, Hemachandra. In the Namokar Mantra, the five panch-paramsthis include Ācāryas, Upadhyayas and the ordinary Munis(Sadhus).

The lineage (line of ordination) of Ācāryas goes back to Lord Mahavira Swami. After the Ganadharas (immediate disciples of Lord Mahavira), there was a lineage of Kevalis (ending with Jambuswami), who were succeeded by Shruta-Kevalis. After the last Shruta-Kevali Bhadrabahu, two separate lineages of Ācāryas emerged, a Digambar lineage and a Shvetambara lineage. Several lineages of the Ācāryas exist in both sects. The lineages became Bhattaraka or Yati lineages when it became impossible for them to travel freely. Reforms during the British period restored the Ācārya lineages (Shvetambara Murtipujak Ācārya Vijayanandsuri in 1886 and Digambar Ācārya Shantisagar in 1922).

According to Ācārya Nemichandra (10th-century), Ācārya has thirty-six primary attributes (mūla guṇa) consisting in:

- Twelve kinds of austerities (tapas);
- Ten virtues (dasa-lakṣaṇa dharma);
- Five kinds of observances in regard to faith, knowledge, conduct, austerities, and power.
- Six essential duties (Ṣadāvaśyaka); and
- Gupti- Controlling the threefold activity of:
  - the body;
  - the organ of speech; and
  - the mind.

According to the Jain text, Dravyasamgraha,

Those who themselves practise the five-fold observances in regard to faith (darśanācāra), knowledge (jñānācāra), power (vīryācāra), conduct (cāritrācāra), and austerities (tapācāra), and guide disciples to follow these observances, are the Chief Preceptors (Ācāryas), worthy of meditation.” (52)

— Dravyasamgraha (52)

Chandanaji became the first Jain woman to receive the title of Ācārya in 1987.

== Mūla Guṇa ==
=== Twelve kinds of austerities (tapas) ===
External austerities

The external austerities (bāhya tapas) are fasting (anaśana), reduced diet (avamaudarya), special restrictions for begging food (vrttiparisamkhyāna), giving up stimulating and delicious dishes (rasaparityāga), lonely habitation (viviktaśayyāsana), and mortification of the body (kāyakleśa).

Internal austerities

Expiation (prāyaścitta), reverence (vinaya), service (vaiyāvrttya), study (svādhyāya), renunciation (vyutsarga), and meditation (dhyāna) are the internal austerities (antarañg tapas).

Ācārya Pujyapada's Sarvārthasiddhi:

How are these internal? These are internal as the mind is restrained or subdued in these cases. The removal of sins committed by negligence or under the influence of passions is expiation. Reverence to the holy personages is ‘vinaya’. Service is the help rendered to the saints in difficulty by bodily activity or with things. Contemplation of knowledge or giving up sloth or idleness is study. The giving up of the attitude of ‘I’ and ‘mine’ is renunciation. Checking the ramblings of the mind is meditation.

=== Five kinds of observances ===
Five kinds of observances in regard to faith, knowledge, conduct, austerities, and power. These are:

1. Darśanācāra- Believing that the pure Self is the only object belonging to the self and all other objects, including the karmic matter (dravya karma and no-karma) are alien; further, believing in the six substances (dravyas), seven Realities (tattvas) and veneration of Jina, Teachers, and the Scripture, is the observance in regard to faith (darśanā).
2. Jñānācāra- Reckoning that the pure Self has no delusion, is distinct from attachment and aversion, knowledge itself, and sticking to this notion always is the observance in regard to knowledge (jñānā).
3. Cāritrācāra- Being free from attachment etc. is right conduct which gets obstructed by passions. In view of this, getting always engrossed in the pure Self, free from all corrupting dispositions, is the observance in regard to conduct (cāritrā).
4. Tapācāra- Performance of different kinds of austerities is essential to spiritual advancement. Performance of penances with due control of senses and desires constitutes the observance in regard to austerities (tapā).
5. Vīryācāra- Carrying out the above mentioned four observances with full vigour and intensity, without digression and concealment of true strength, constitutes the observance in regard to power (vīryā).

=== Six essential duties ===
Six essential duties (Şadāvaśyaka) of the Ācārya are:

1. samatā (sāmāyika) – Equanimity; the state of being without inclination or aversion towards birth or death, gain or loss, glee or pain, friend or foe, etc.
2. vandanā – Adoration, salutation; of particular Tīrthañkara, or Supreme Being (Parameşthī).
3. stavan – Worshipping; making obeisance to the twenty-four Tīrthañkaras or the five Supreme Beings (Pañca Parameşthī).
4. pratikramaṇa – Self-censure, repentance; to drive oneself away from the multitude of karmas, virtuous or wicked, done in the past.
5. kāyotsarga – Non-attachment to the body; contemplating on the pure Self, thereby disregarding the body.
6. svādhyāya – Contemplation of knowledge; study of the Scripture, teaching, questioning, reflection, reciting, and preaching.

== See also ==
- Digambara monk
- Tapas (Indian religions)
