= Ācārāṅga Sūtra =

Oldest existing Jain text

Information
- Religion: Jainism
- Period: 5th century BCE

The Ācārāṅga Sūtra, the foremost and oldest Jain text (First book c. 5th–4th century BCE; Second book c. Late 4th–3rd century BCE), (3rd c. BCE) is the first of the twelve Angas, part of the agamas which were compiled based on the teachings of 24th Tirthankara Mahavira.

The existing text of the Ācārāṅga Sūtra which is used by the Śvetāmbara sect of Jainism was recompiled and edited by Acharya Devardhigani Kshamashraman, who headed the council held at Valabhi c. 454 CE. The Digambaras do not recognize the available text, and regard the original text as having been lost in its original form. The Digambara text, Mulachara is said to be derived from the original Ācārāṅga Sūtra and discusses the conduct of a Digambara monk.

== Introduction ==
The Ācārāṅga Sūtra is the oldest agama, from a linguistic point of view, written in Ardhamagadhi Prakrit. The Sutra contains two books, or Srutaskandhas. The first book is the older part, to which other treatises were later added. It describes the conduct and behavior of ascetic life: the mode of asking for food, bowl, clothes, conduct while walking and speaking and regulation of possessions by ascetics. It also describes the penance of Mahavira, the Great Hero.

The second book is divided into four sections called Kulas. There were originally five Kûlâs, but the fifth, the Nisîhiyagghana, is now reckoned as a separate work. The first and second parts lay down rules for conduct of ascetics.

The Ācārāṅga has been described in details in Samavāyāṅga and the Nandῑ. According to them, the main studies of the Ācārāṅga are 'Ācāra gocara' i.e. code of conduct, vinaya (humility), vaināyika (fruition of humility), sthāna (difference postures), gamana (travelling), cankramaṇa (movements), bhojana-mātra (quantity of food intake), svādhyāya (spiritual studies), bhāṣā samiti (principles of speech), gupti (restraint or of mind, speech and body), sayyā (place of stay), upādhῑ (belongings) etc. The Ācārāṅga recommends purity of all these aspects. Acharya Umāsvati has briefly dealt with the subject matter of the nine chapters of the Ācārāṅga. They are:

1. Ṣaḍjῑvanikāya yatanā – self-restraint in respect of the six kinds of living beings.
2. Abandoning of ego over worldly things.
3. Conquest over trials and tribulations of life.
4. Unshakable perception about righteousness.
5. Detachment towards worldly affairs.
6. The process to decay or destroy the karmas.
7. Service towards elders.
8. Penance and austerities.
9. Renunciation of attachment to sexual objects

Ācārāṅga Sūtra quotes:

I so pronounce that all the omniscients of all times, state, speak, propagate, and elaborate that nothing which breathes, which exists, which lives, or which has essence or potential of life, should be destroyed or ruled over, or subjugated, or harmed, or denied of its essence or potential.

This truth, propagated by the self-knowing omniscients, after understanding all there is in universe, is pure, undefileable, and eternal.

In support of this Truth, I ask you a question – "Is sorrow or pain desirable to you ?" If you say "yes it is", it would be a lie. If you say, "No, It is not" you will be expressing the truth. What I want to add to the truth expressed by you is that, as sorrow or pain is not desirable to you, so it is to all which breath, exist, live or have any essence of life. To you and all, it is undesirable, and painful, and repugnant.

That which you consider worth destroying is (like) yourself. That which you consider worth disciplining is (like) yourself. That which you consider worth subjugating is (like) yourself. That which you consider worth killing is (like) yourself.

The result of actions by you has to be borne by you, so do not destroy anything.

== Monasticism ==
The Ācārāṅga Sūtra describes lack of clothes as being in full conformity with Jain doctrine (AS 1.6.2.3). Another passage in the Ācārāṅga Sūtra refers to the difficulties experienced by naked monk and also to the fact that he does not need to beg for and repair clothes (AS 1.6.3.1–2).

The Ācārāṅga Sūtra describes two types of monks - Jinkalpi (who remained naked) and Sthavirkalpi (who may or may not drape garments around them). The Ācārāṅga Sūtra states the following three types of monks:

1. Jinkalpi Achel - naked
2. Sthavirkalpi Eksataka - draped 1 cloth
3. Sthavirkalpi Santrottar - draped 2 or 3 clothes

Śvetāmbara texts state that knowledge of the scriptures gradually dwindled and monks did not possess the necessary qualifications to become Jinkalpi. A monk needs to know 10 or more purvas to be jinkalpi. All other monks with lesser knowledge were Sthavirkalpi and were allowed to drape clothes. Bhadrabahu and Sthulabhadra are both considered to have been sthavirkalpi monks by Śvetāmbaras and that Śvetāmbaras believe they were white-clad. Jinkalpi monks went extinct soon after Jambuswami attained nirvana. All the other monks of the Śvetāmbara tradition are considered to be Sthavirkalpi as they drape white clothes.

Jinkalpi monks are said to have differed from present-day Digambara monks. They did not live within the society and meditated in seclusion in forests and caves and practiced much more austerity than monks today can.

Little to no information is found on how householders must conduct themselves. The text does not delineate a formal code of ethics and monastic practice as it is meant for Sthavirkalpi (more lenient than Jinakalpi monks) monks only.

== Commentaries ==
Following are the commentaries on the Sutra:

- Tîkâ of Silanka, also called Tattvâditya, said to have been finished in the 876 CE, with the help of Vâhari Sâdhu.
- Dîpikâ of Jinahamsa Sûri, a teacher of the Brihat Kharatara Gakkha.
- Pârsvakandra's Bâlâvabodha, generally closely follows the explanation of the older commentaries, more especially that of the Dîpikâ.

== Sources ==
- Ācārya, Tulsi; Ācārya, Mahāprajña (2001). Acharanga-bhasyam: English Translation of the Original Text of Ayaro Together with Its Roman Transliteration and Bhasyam (Sanskrit Commentary). Jain Vishwa Bharati.
- Jain, Sagarmal (1998). "Jain Literature [From earliest time to c. 10th A.D.]". Aspects of Jainology: Volume VI.
- Dundas, Paul (2002) [1992]. The Jains (2nd ed.). Routledge. ISBN 0-415-26605-X.
- Jacobi, Herman (1884). Friedrich Max Müller (ed.). The Sacred Books of the East: Gaina Sutras, pt. 1. Clarendon Press.
- Illustrated SRI ACARANGA SUTRA (2 volumes), Ed. by Pravartaka Amar Muni, Shrichand Surana Saras, Eng. tr. by Surendra Bothra, Prakrit Gatha — Hindi exposition — English exposition and Appendices
- Ācārāṅgasūtra with Śīlāṅka’s commentary, in Muni Jambūvijaya (ed.). Ācārāṅgasūtram and Sūtrakṛtāṅgasūtram (re-edition of Āgamodaya Samiti edition), Delhi, 1978.
