= Kamaldah Jain temple =

Śvētāmbara Jain temple in the state of Bihar

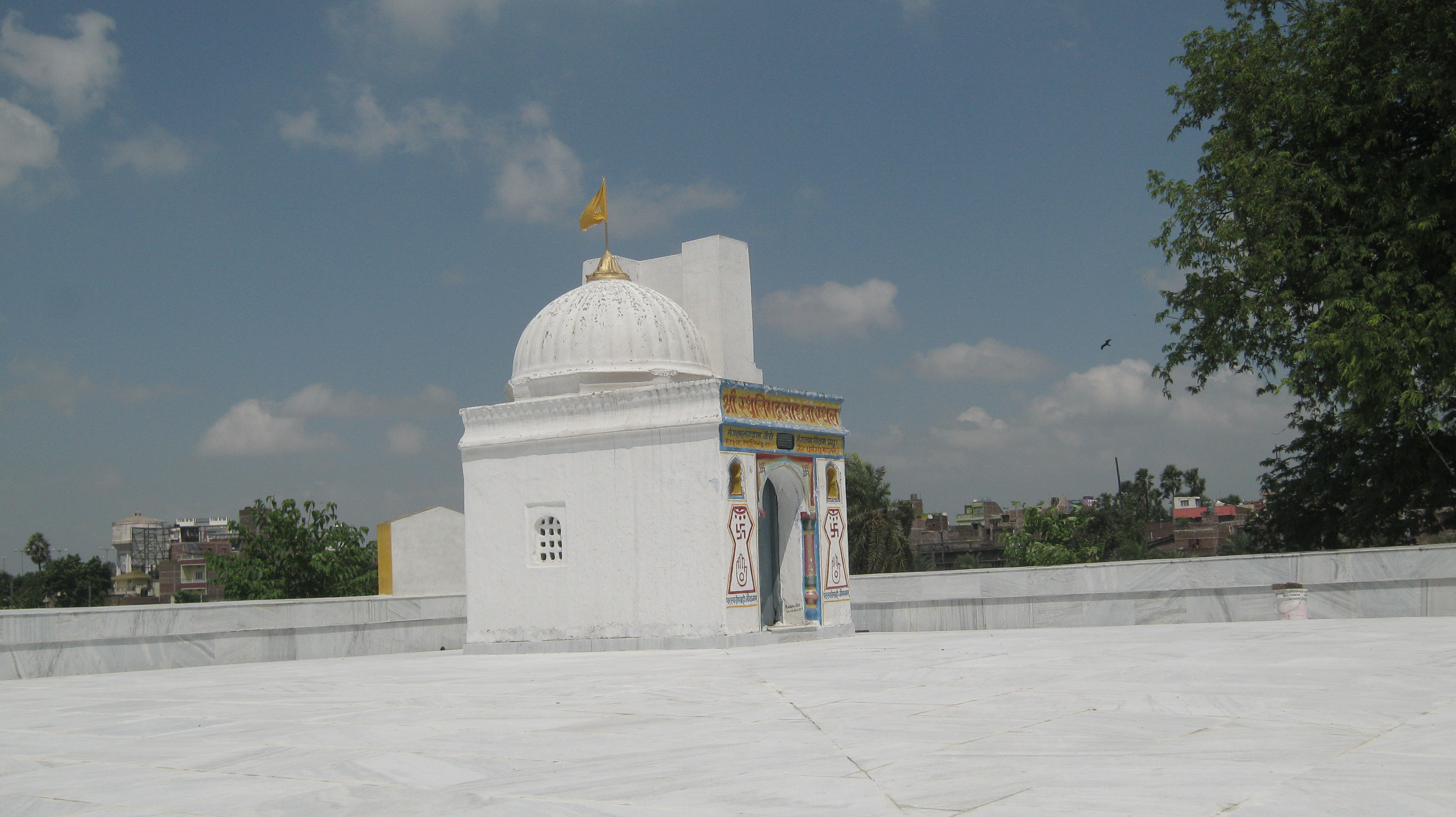
- Kamaldah Jain temple

Religion
- Affiliation: Jainism
- Sect: Śvētāmbara
- Deity: Neminatha
- Festival: Mahavir Jayanti

Location
- Location: Patna, Bihar
- Interactive map of Kamaldah Jain temple
- Coordinates: 25°35′47.7″N 85°12′11″E

Architecture
- Established: 1729 CE
- Temple: 3

The Kamaldah Jain temple, located in Patna, Bihar, is one of the oldest Jain temples belonging to the Śvētāmbara sect of Jainism.

== History ==
Kamaldah Jain temple is believed to be built on the site where Jain acharya Sthulabhadra (297—198 BCE) spent his last days. Sthulabhadra, a major preceptor of Śvētāmbara sect of Jainism, was the successor of Bhadrabahu The temple was built in 1729 CE (V.S. 1848) to commemorate the Sthulabhadra. The temple houses an inscription dating back to 1792 CE.

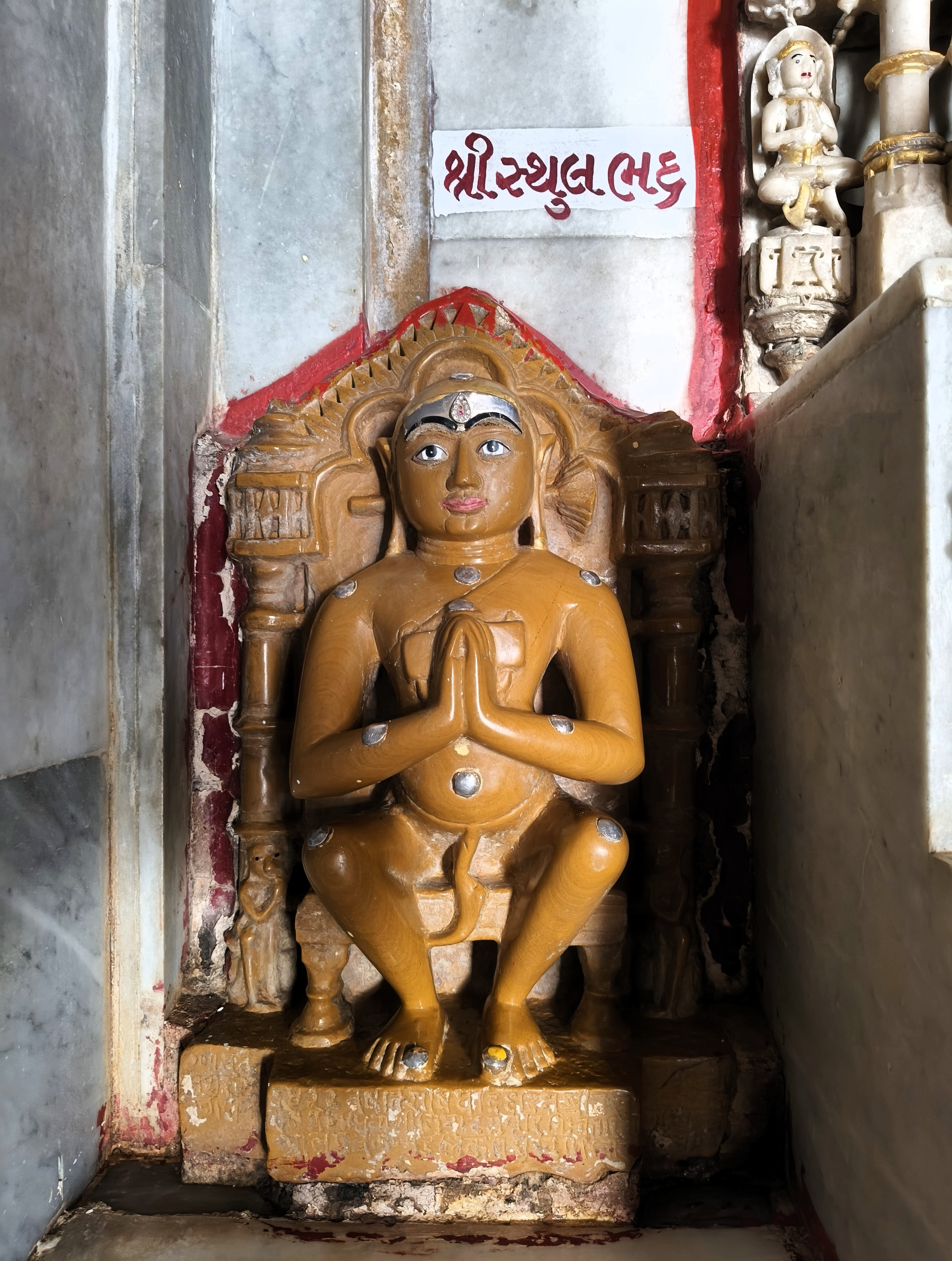
14th century Ārya Sthūlabhadra idol at the Khaḍākhoṭadī no Pāḍo Jaina Temple at Patan

== Architecture ==
Kamaldah Jain temple is built on a brick mound. The temple features an illustration of Sthulabhadra. The second temple is dedicated to Sudarshana. The temple houses black stone foot prints of Sudarshana to which saffron is applied daily as offering. The door of the temple has an image of Bhairava. The temple is an important pilgrimage site for Jains and is part of Jain circuit of bihar.

A 108 feet (33 m) Mahavira statue of Lord Mahavira is planned as part of the proposed development.

== Conservation ==
The Government of Bihar has included this temple for conservation along with Agam Kuan, Durakhi devi temple, Begu Hajjam's Mosque, Golghar, and Takht Sri Patna Sahib.
