= Shrutakevalin =

Shrutakevalin (Śruta Kevalī) a term used in Jainism for those ascetics who have complete knowledge of Jain Agamas. Shrutakevalin and Kevalin (omniscient beings) are equal from the perspective of knowledge, but Shrutajnana is paroksha (indirect) whereas Kevala jnana (omniscience) is pratyaksha (direct). Kevali can describe infinite parts of the infinite knowledge that they possess. Shrutakevalins are learned of 14 Purvas.

According to the Jain text, Sarvārthasiddhi: "The teachers are of three kinds, namely the Omniscient Tirthankara, his disciples (Śruta Kevalis) and the later preceptors (Acharyas). The scriptures were really taught by the Omniscient Tirthamkara, gifted with perfect knowledge of unimaginable power and splendour. The Lord is free from all kinds of impurities and is possessed of direct and perfect knowledge. Hence His word is authoritative. The Lord’s chief disciples called Ganadharas gifted with vast knowledge recollect the import of the Lord’s teachings and compose works called angas and pūrvas."

After the Moksha (liberation) of Mahavira, Gautamaswami, Sudharmaswami and Jambuswami were three Kevalins. After Jambuswami, according to Digambara tradition, Vishnu, Nandi, Aparajita, Govardhan and Bhadrabahu and according to Svetambara tradition, Prabhava, Shaiyamabhava, Vishobhadra, Sabhuvijaya, Bhadrabahu and Sthulibhadra were the six Shrutakevalins. Some Svetambara don't consider Sthulibhadra as Shrutakevalin and accept only other five.

== Sources ==
- Rice, B. Lewis (1889), Inscriptions at Sravana Belgola: A Chief Seat of the Jains, Bangalore: Mysore Govt. Central Press
