= Uvasaggaharam Stotra =

Stotra dedicated to a Tīirthankara Parshvanatha

Information
- Religion: Jainism
- Author: Bhadrabahu
- Period: 4th-3rd century BCE

Uvasaggaharam Stotra is a Jain religious hymn (stotra) in adoration of the twenty-third tirthankara Parshvanatha. It was composed by Bhadrabahu who lived in around 4th–3rd century BC.

It is a hymn that is believed in and recited by the followers of the Śvetāmbara sect and is one of the Navsmaran (or 9 sacred hymns) of its Murtipujaka sub-sect.

== Text ==
Prakrit

उवसग्गहरं पासं, पासं वंदामि कम्मघण-मुक्कं ।
विसहर-विस-निन्नासं मंगल-कल्लाण-आवासं ॥

विसहर-फुल्लिंग-मंतं कंठे धारेइ जो सया मणुओ ।
तस्स गह-रोग-मारी, दुट्ठ-जरा जंति उवसामं ॥

चिट्ठउ दूरे मंतो, तुज्झ पणामो वि बहुफलो होइ ।
नर तिरिएसु वि जीवा, पावंति न दुक्ख-दोगच्चं ॥

तुह सम्मत्ते लद्धे चिंतामणि कप्प-पायव-ब्भहिए ।
पावंति अविग्घेणं जीवा अयरामरं ठाणं ॥

इह संथुओ महायस भत्ति-भर-निब्भरेण हिअएण ।
ता देव! दिज्ज बोहिं, भवे भवे पास जिणचंद ॥

IAST

uvasaggaharaṃ pāsaṃ, pāsaṃ vaṃdāmi kammaghaṇa-mukkaṃ .
visahara-visa-ninnāsaṃ maṃgala-kallāṇa-āvāsaṃ ..

visahara-phulliṃga-maṃtaṃ kaṃṭhe dhārei jo sayā maṇuo .
tassa gaha-roga-mārī, duṭṭha-jarā jaṃti uvasāmaṃ ..

ciṭṭhaü dūre maṃto, tujjha paṇāmo vi bahuphalo hoi .
nara tiriesu vi jīvā, pāvaṃti na dukkha-dogaccaṃ ..

tuha sammatte laddhe ciṃtāmaṇi kappa-pāyava-bbhahie .
pāvaṃti aviggheṇaṃ jīvā ayarāmaraṃ ṭhāṇaṃ ..

iha saṃthuo mahāyasa bhatti-bhara-nibbhareṇa hiaeṇa .
tā deva! dijja bohiṃ, bhave bhave pāsa jiṇacaṃda ..

English translation

I bow to Lord Parshwanath, who is attended by the distress-removing Parshwa deity,
who is free from all types of Karma, who is the destroyer of the poisonous defilements and who is the abode of bliss and well-being.
If one always holds in his neck the charm of visaharaphullinga,
his evil planetary effects, disease, epidemics and acute fever are calmed down.
Let aside that charm, obeisance to you also would be highly fruitful;
(thereby) humans and animals too would not get misery or evil state.
By gaining the right perception laid by you, which is superior to the desire-yielding jewel
And the desire-yielding tree, souls easily attain the unaging, immortal state.
Oh. Highly esteemable Lord, I have thus prayed to you with the heart flowing with devotion;
hence Omniscient Parshwa Lord, bestow the wisdom to me in every life.

== Legend ==
A legend says that Bhadrabahu penned and recited the sacred hymn to eradicate an ongoing plague. It has 5 verses. According to the legend, it had 22 verses and its recitation invoked demi-gods and demi-goddesses. However, 17 verses were reduced later.

== See also ==
- Parshvanatha
- Bhadrabahu
- Padmavati (Jainism)
- Dharanendra
