= Sthulabhadra =

Indian Jain monk (297–198 BCE)

Acharya Sthulabhadra Suri
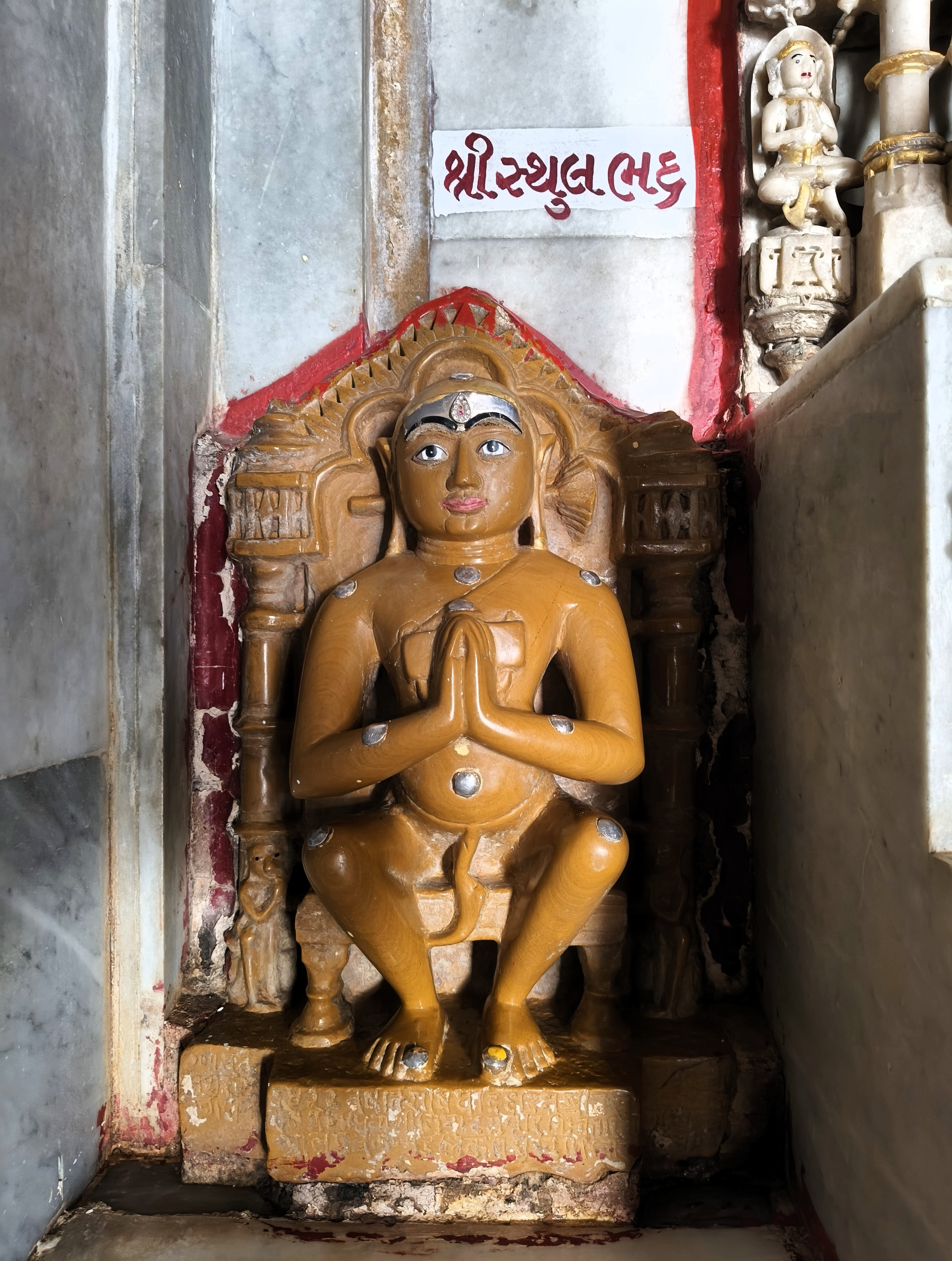
- 14th century Ārya Sthūlabhadra idol at the Khaḍākhoṭadī no Pāḍo Jaina Temple (Patan, Gujarat, India)
- Preceded by: Acharya Bhadrabahusuri
- Succeeded by: Acharya Mahagirisuri and Acharya Suhastinsuri

Personal life
- Born: 297 BCE
- Died: 198 BCE (aged 98–99)
- Parent: Sakatala (father)

Religious life
- Religion: Jainism
- Sect: Śvetāmbara

Religious career
- Teacher: Acharya Sambhutavijayasuri

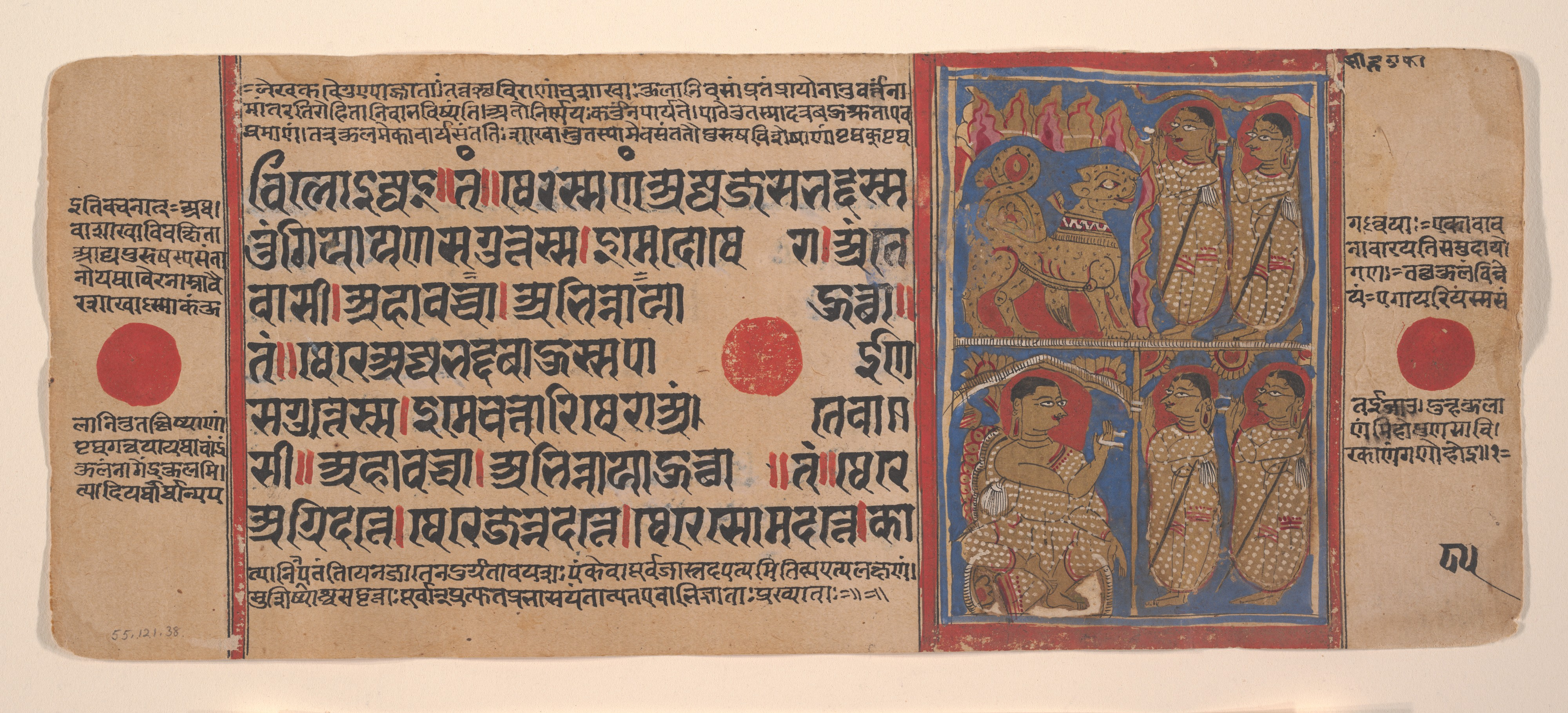
Sthulabhadra

Sthulabhadra (297–198 BCE) was a Jain monk who lived during the 3rd century BCE. He was a disciple of Bhadrabahu and Sambhutavijaya. His father was Sakatala, a minister in Nanda kingdom before the arrival of Chandragupta Maurya. When his brother became the chief minister of the kingdom, Sthulabhadra became a Jain monk and succeeded Bhadrabahu in the Pattavali as per the writings of the Kalpa Sūtra. He is mentioned in the 12th-century Jain text Parisistaparvan (appendix to the Trisasti-shalakapurusa-caritra) by Hemachandra.

== Life ==
Sthulabhadra was a son of the Dhana Nanda's minister Sakatala and brother of Shrikaya. He is traditionally dated from 297 to 198 BCE. He loved and lived with a royal dancer in Dhana Nanda's court named Rupkosa. He denied ministry after the death of his father and became a Jain monk. His brother became the chief minister in Nanda empire later. He became a disciple of Sambhutavijaya (347-257 BCE) and Bhadrabahu (322-243 BCE). He led an ascetic life for 12 years.

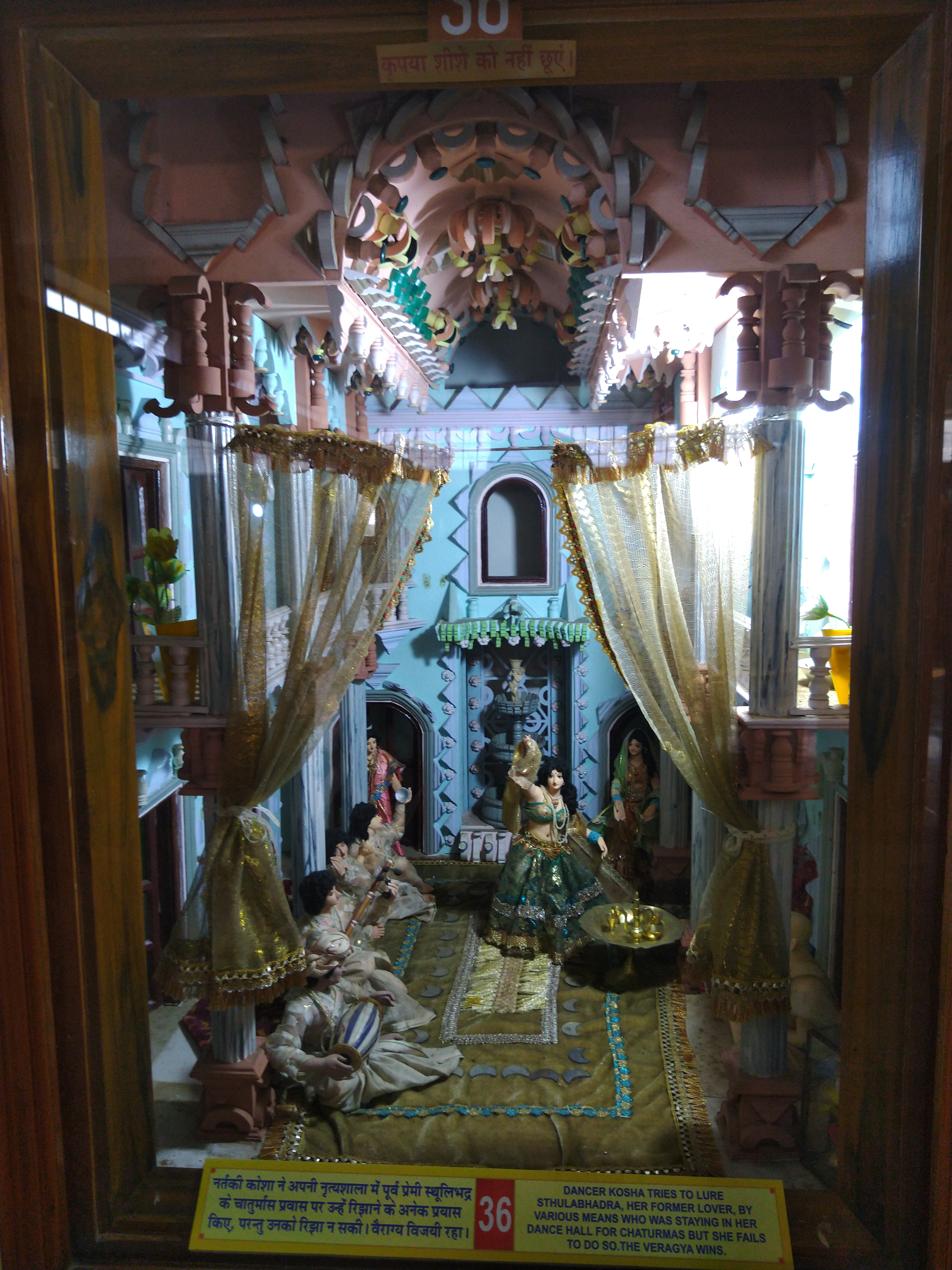
A diorama in Jain Museum of Madhuban depicting Sthulabhadra spending his chaturmas at Rupkosa's home, during which she tried to lure him away from ascetic life but failed.

He spent his chaturmas at Rupkosa's home, during which she tried to lure him away from ascetic life but failed. Sthulabhadra in turn gave her vows of a Shravika (Jain laywoman).

He is said to have learned only 10 purvas (pre-canons with meanings) from Bhadrabahu. Although he knew the last 4 purvas as well, but since he did not know the meaning associated with them, he is not considered to have been a Shrutakevalin. He was succeeded by his disciples Acharya Mahagirisuri and Acharya Suhastinsuri, whom he taught only 10 purvas because Bhadrabahu had imposed a condition upon him that he would not teach the last 4 purvas to anyone because he had used the knowledge of purvas to display magical powers. 10th century Digambara texts state that Sthulabhadra permitted the use loincloth during the 12-year famine, a practice that started the Śvetāmbara order, but is considered as baseless according to followers of the Śvetāmbara sect. Avashyak Bhashya, a 5th-century Śvetāmbara text written by Jinabhadra claims that the Śvetāmbara sect had always existed and that the Digambara sect was created by a rebellious monk named Sivabhuti.

== Legacy ==
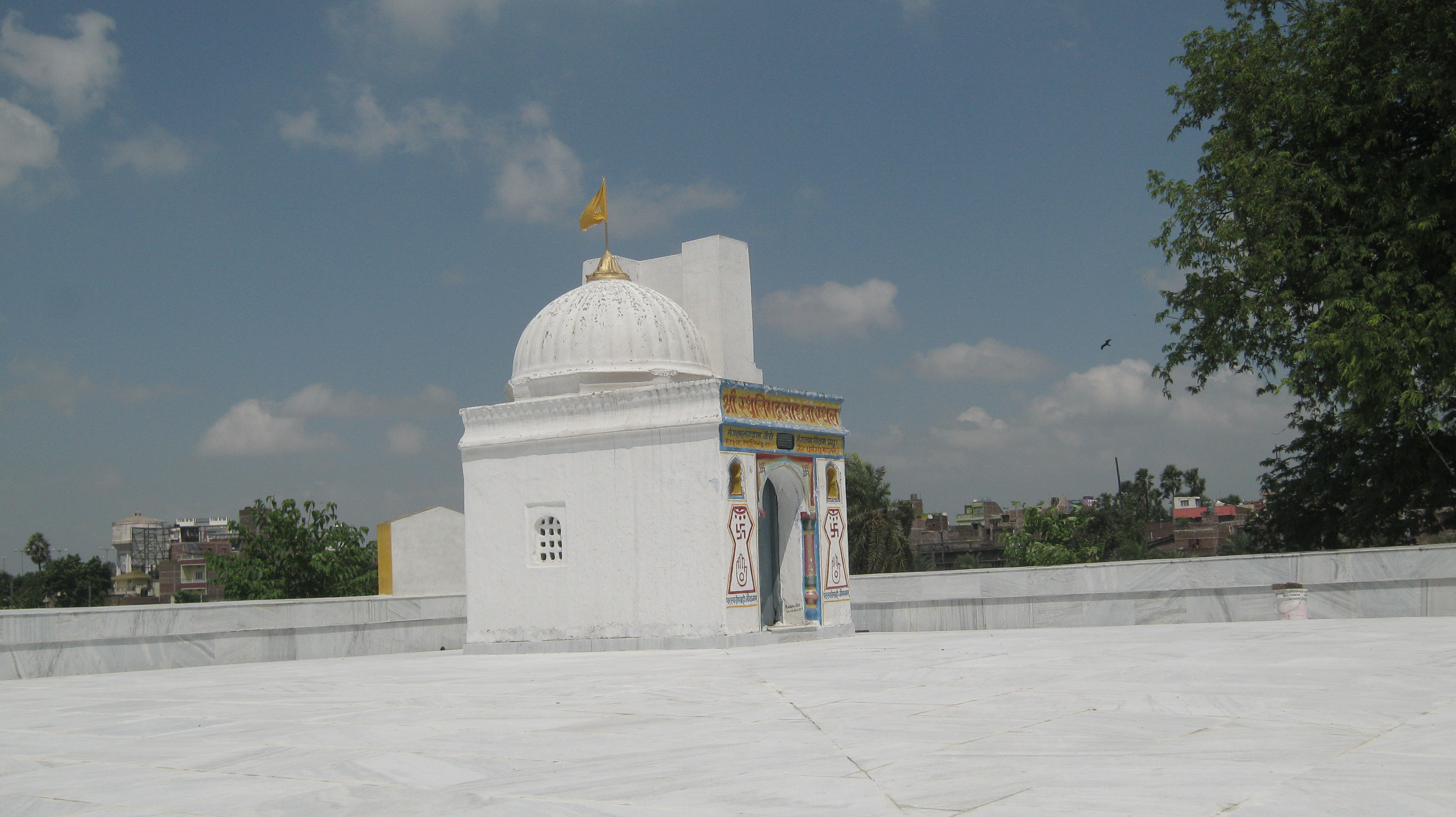
Sthulabhadra Jain temple in Kamaldah, Patna

Śvetāmbaras venerate Acharya Sthulabhadrasuri in the following hymn:

मङ्गलं भगवान् वीरो मङ्गलं गौतमः प्रभुः। मङ्गलं स्थूलभद्राद्या जैनधर्मोऽस्तु मङ्गलम्॥

IAST :

maṅgalaṃ bhagavān vīro maṅgalaṃ gautamaḥ prabhuḥ. maṅgalaṃ sthūlabhadrādyā jainadharmo'stu maṅgalam..

Meaning:

Bhagawän Mahävir is auspicious, Ganadhar Gautam Swämi is auspicious; Ächärya Sthulibhadra is auspicious, Jain religion is auspicious.

== See also ==
- Mahavira
- Swayamprabhasuri
- Ratnaprabhasuri
