= Kevala jnana =

Omniscience in Jainism

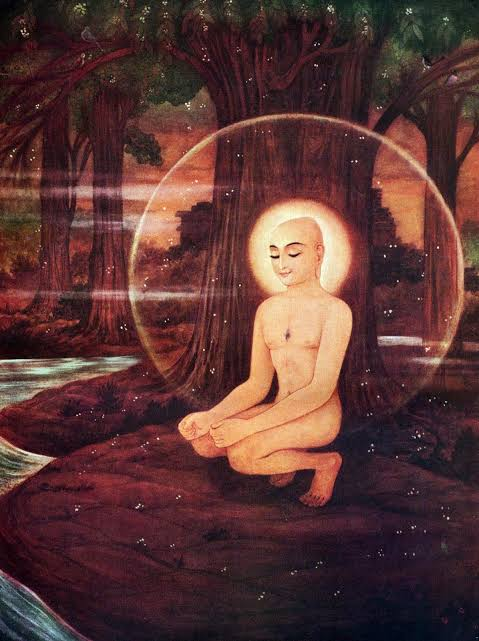
Kevala Jnana of Mahavira

Kevala jnana (Sanskrit: केवल ज्ञान, IAST: kevala jñāna) or Kevala gyana, also known as Kaivalya, means omniscience in Jainism and is roughly translated as complete understanding, perfect knowledge, or supreme wisdom.

Kevala jnana is believed to be an intrinsic quality of all souls. This quality is masked by karmic particles that surround the soul. Every soul has the potential to obtain omniscience by shedding these karmic particles. Jain scriptures speak of twelve stages through which the soul achieves this goal. A soul that has attained kevala jnana is called a kevalin (केवलिन्). According to the Jains, only kevalins can comprehend objects in all aspects and manifestations; others are capable of only partial knowledge.

The views of the two sects of Jainism, the Digambara and Śvētāmbara Jains differ on the subject of kevalins. According to Digambaras, a kevalin does not experience hunger or thirst, whereas according to Svetambaras, a kevalin has normal human needs and he travels and preaches too. Digambara Jains believe that kevalins do not act in the normal sense of the word, they sit motionless in padmasana, and their bodies emit Divyadhvani, a sacred sound that is interpreted by their followers as the fundamental truth. According to both traditions, the last kevalin was a disciple of one of the eleven chief disciples of the last tirthankara, Mahāvīra; his name is recorded as Jambuswami. It is also believed that no one after Jambuswami will have the ability to obtain kevala jnana for the next tens of thousands of years.

== Literary sources ==
The claim of existence of omniscience by Jains, who deny the existence of a creator god, is a unique phenomenon. The Sutrakritanga text of the Svetambara school, elaborates on the concept of omniscience and provides details of the other qualities of an omniscient individual. Another text, the Kalpa Sūtra, gives details of Mahavira's omniscience:

When the Venerable Ascetic Mahavira had become a Jina and Arhat (Arihant), he was a Kevali, omniscient and comprehending all objects; he knew and saw all conditions of the world, of gods, men, and demons: whence they come, whither they go, whether they are born as men or animals or become gods or hell-beings (upapada), the ideas, the thoughts of their minds, the food, doings, desires, the open and secret deeds of all the living beings in the whole world; he the Arhat (Arihant), for whom there is no secret, knew and saw all conditions of all living beings in the world.

Immediately after the death of Mahavira, his disciple Indrabhuti Gautama became a kevalin. According to the tradition, the teachings of the tirthankara were memorised and preserved over many centuries.

In the second Upanga Agama, the Rājapraśnīya, there is a dialogue between Kesi, a disciple of Pārśva, and Payasi, a materialist king. In this dialogue, Kesi proves to the king the existence of jiva and its ability to obtain kevala jñana .

The Jains have long debated with Hindus and Buddhists regarding omniscience. Bhikkhu Dharmakirti criticised the Jain notion of omniscience in his Pramanavartika. The Hindu philosopher Kumarila argued that only the Veda had the authority to define human moral values because it is "beginningless, authorless and of self-sufficient validity". In response, the Jain monk Haribhadra (c. 5th century CE) wrote that humans already had knowledge of everything knowable and that it only had to be illuminated or uncovered. Omniscience , according to Haribhadra, is inherent in living beings.

Samantabhadra was the first philosopher-monk in the history of Indian philosophy who tried to use inference as a method to establish the existence of omniscience. In his famous work, Aptamimamsa, Samantabhadra asserts:

Objects that are minute (like atoms), past (like Lord Rama), and distant (like Mount Meru), being the objects of inference (anumeya – and, therefore, also objects of knowledge – prameya), must be perceivable directly by someone; like the fire on the hill is an object of inference for a distant person but is perceived directly by the one who is in its proximity. The one who perceives directly the objects of knowledge that are minute, past, and distant is the Omniscient (sarvajña); this way the existence of the Omniscient is truly and firmly established.

— Āptamīmāṁsā (5)

Akalanka (c. 720–760 CE) put forward the concept of suniscita-asambhavad-badhaka-pramana as a reason for the existence of omniscience. This concept is a well-known fact which is "we have no valid methods of knowing to deny the existence of omniscience." Hemacandra (c. 1088 – c. 1173) combined Samantabhadra and Akalanka's ideas of sarvajña in his Pramanamimasa to establish the existence of omniscience.

== Jain epistemology ==
In Jain epistemology, there are two kinds of valid methods of knowledge: pratyakṣa or "direct knowledge" and parokṣa or "indirect knowledge". Kevala jñana is considered pratyakṣa. Five ways of obtaining knowledge are defined: matijñana acquired through sensory perception; srutajñana acquired through understanding of verbal and written sentences; avadhijñana, manhaparyaya jñana and kevala jñana.

Jains contrast all attempts to proclaim absolute truth with Anekantavada, which can be explained through the parable of the "blind men and an elephant". In this story, each blind man feels a different part of an elephant such as its trunk, leg, ear, etc. All the men claimed to understand and explain the true appearance of the elephant, but could only partly succeed, due to their limited perspectives. This principle is more formally stated by observing that objects are infinite in their qualities and modes of existence, so they cannot be completely grasped in all aspects and manifestations by finite human perception. According to the Jains, only the Kevalis—omniscient beings—can comprehend objects in all aspects and manifestations; others are only capable of only partial knowledge. Consequently, no single, specific, human view can claim to represent absolute truth.

== Stages of spiritual development ==
According to Jain texts, there are fourteen stages (gunasthana) of spiritual development. The soul can gradually free itself, first from the worst, then from the less bad and finally from all kinds of karma, and it manifests the innate qualities of knowledge, belief, and conduct in a more and more perfect form. The first four gunasthana are related to belief or rationality in perception. If and when the soul acquires rationality in perception, it moves on to the fourth gunasthana. Stages five to fourteen relate to conduct. The purity in conduct determines the gunasthana from 5th stage onwards. Those who have taken the anuvratas (minor vows) may reach up to the fifth gunasthana. The sixth to fourteenth gunasthanas can only be attained by those who have taken the Mahavratas (major vows) of Jain ascetic. The following are the stages of spiritual development:

No.	Gunasthana	Description
1.	mithya-drishti	The stage of wrong believer
2.	sasvadana-samyagdrsti	The stage of one who has a slight taste of right belief
3.	misradrsti	The stage of mixed belief
4.	avirata-samyagdrsti	The stage of one who has true belief but does not have self-discipline
5.	desavirata	The stage of partial self-control
6.	pramatta-samyata	The stage of complete self-discipline, although sometimes wavers due to negligence
7.	apramatta samyata	The stage of self-control without negligence
8.	nivrtti badra samparaya	The stage of one in whom the passions are still occurring in a gross form
9.	annivrtti badara samparaya	The stage of one who practices anivratti karana; however, the passions are still occurring
10.	suksama samparaya	The stage of one in whom the passions occur in a subtle form
11.	upasana kasaya vitaraga chadmasta	The stage of one who has suppressed every passion but still does not possess omniscience
12.	ksina kasay vitaraga chadmasta	The stage of who has annihilated every passion but does not yet possess omniscience
13.	sayogi kevalin	The stage of omniscience with activity
14.	ayogi kevalin	The stage of omniscience without any activity

== See also ==
- Shrutakevalin
- Jain cosmology
