= Bhadrabāhu =

Indian Jain monk and teacher (c. 367–298 BCE)

Acharya Bhadrabāhu Swami/Suri
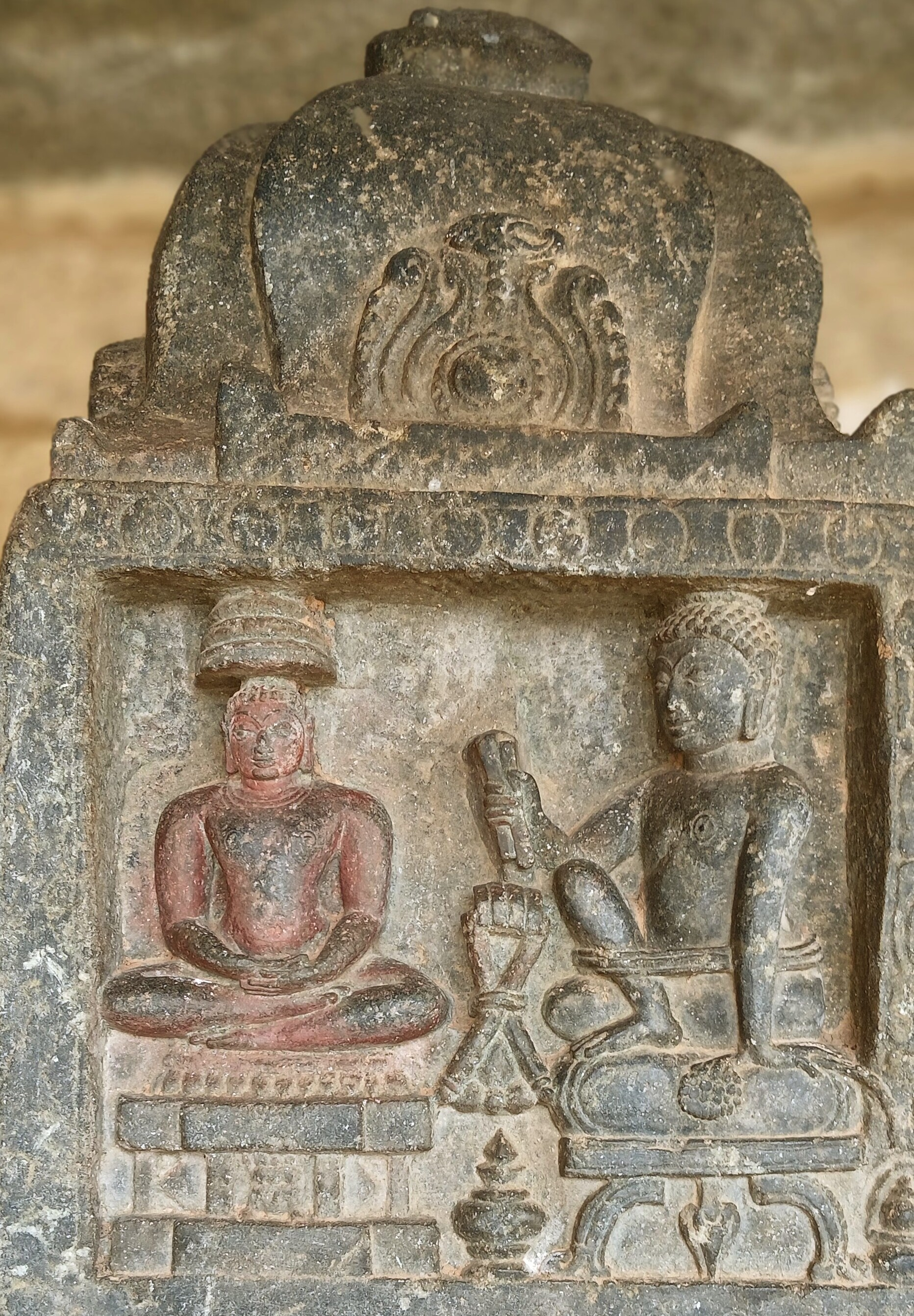
- Sculpture of Chandragupta Maurya (left) and Bhadrabahu (right) at Chandragupta Basadi

Personal life
- Born: c. 367 BCE Pundravardhana
- Died: c. 298 BCE Shravanabelagola
- Notable work(s): Uvasagharam Stotra, Kalpa Sutra

Religious life
- Religion: Jainism
- Sect: Digambara and Śvetāmbara
- Initiation: by Govarddhana Mahamuni (Digambara) by Acharya Yashobhadrasuri (Śvetāmbara)

Religious career
- Successor: Acharya Vishakha (Digambara); Acharya Sthulabhadrasuri (Śvetāmbara)
- Ascetics initiated: Chandragupta Maurya (Digambara); Sthavir Godas, Sthavir Agnidatt, Sthavir Yagnadatt, Sthavir Somdatt (Śvetāmbara)

Ācārya Bhadrabāhu (c. 367 – c. 298 BC) was a Jain monk and scholar, traditionally regarded as the last Shruta Kevalin, or the final ascetic to possess complete knowledge of the Jain scriptures. According to both sects of Jainism, he was the last Shrutakevali. He is widely known as the spiritual guru of Chandragupta Maurya.

According to the Digambara tradition, he was the spiritual teacher of Chandragupta Maurya, the founder of the Maurya Empire. According to the Digambara sect of Jainism, there were five Shruta Kevalins in Jainism – Govarddhana Mahamuni, Vishnu, Nandimitra, Aparajita and Bhadrabahu.

According to the Śvetāmbara tradition, he was the author of the holy Kalpa Sūtra, which describes the life of Mahavira and other Tirthankaras. It also lists down a Sthaviravali (a succession list of the names of the head of the Jain monastic order according to Śvetāmbaras, starting with Mahavira's Ganadhara (disciple) Sudharmaswami). Śvetāmbaras consider Bhadrabahusuri to be a Sthavirkalpi monk (as described in the Ācārāṅga Sūtra, the Kalpa Sūtra, and the Sthananga Sutra), and thus, white-clad. Śvetāmbaras also consider him to have had been a Shruta Kevalin.

== Early life ==
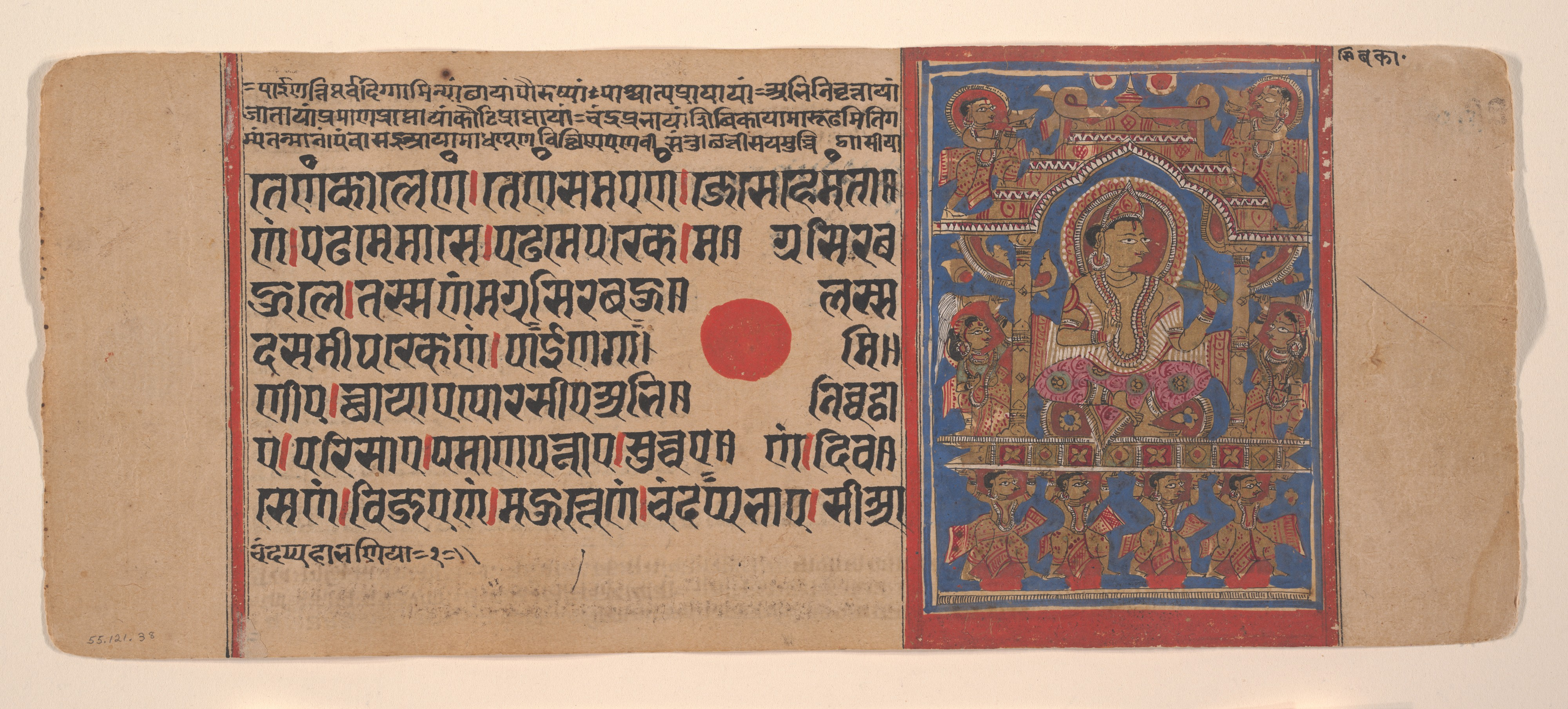
Bhadrabahuswami

Bhadrabahu was born in Pundravardhana (roughly equivalent to modern North Bengal) to a Brahmin family (In Jain philosophy, a pratimādhārī shravaka—a layperson with vows—is considered a Brahman or Bamana) during which time the secondary capital of the Mauryas was Ujjain. When he was seven, Govarddhana Mahamuni predicted that he will be the last Shruta Kevali and took him along for his initial education. According to Śvētāmbara tradition, he lived from 433 BC to 357 BC. Digambara tradition dates him to have died in 365 BC. Natubhai Shah dated him from 322 to 243 BC.

Yasobhadra (351-235 BC), leader of the religious order reorganised by Mahavira, had two principle disciples, Sambhutavijaya (347-257 BC) and Bhadrabahu. After his death the religious order was led by Sambhutivijaya. After Sambhutivijaya's death, Bhadrabahu became the head of the monastic order.

== Digambara biography and explanation of sixteen dreams of Chandragupta ==
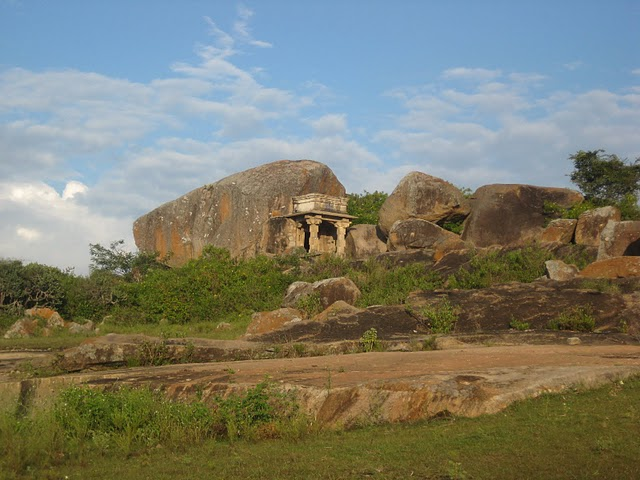
Bhadrabahu Guha on Chandragiri

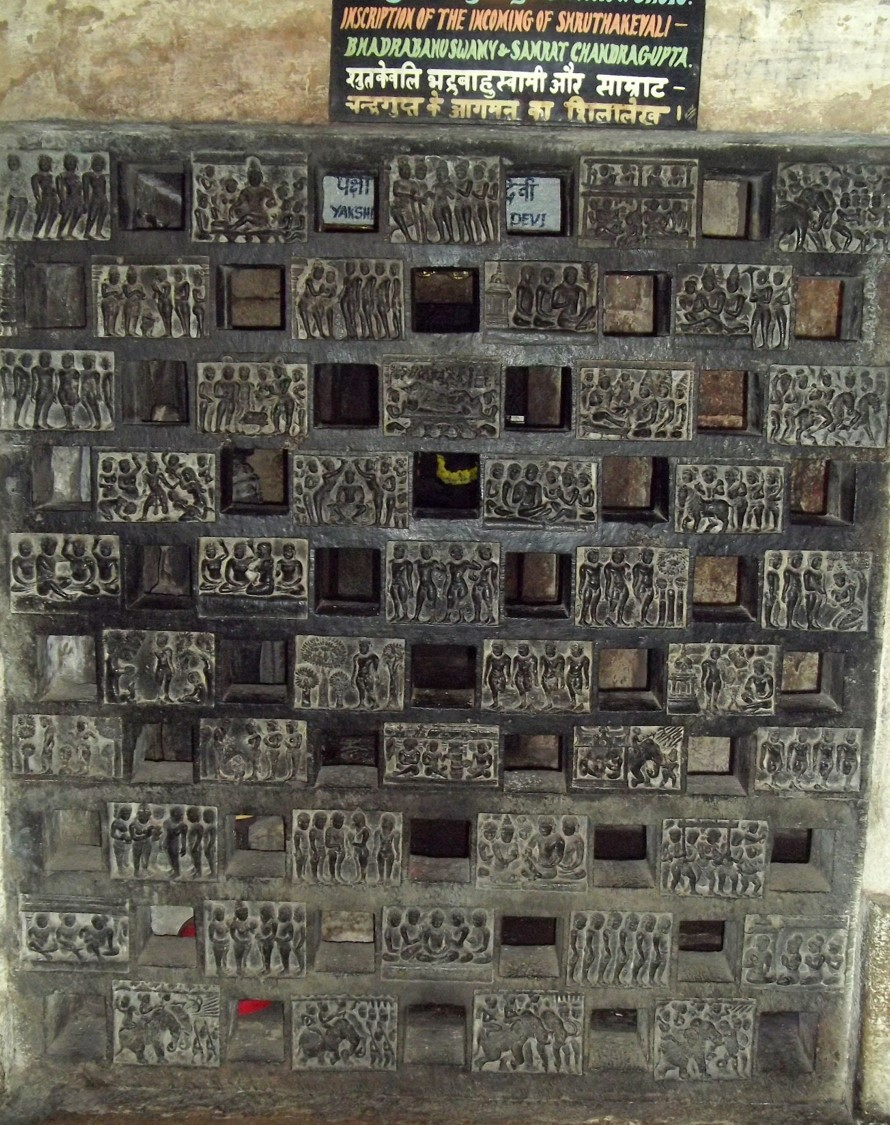
Late inscription at Shravanabelagola describing the incoming of Bhadrabahu and Chandragupta Maurya

The Digambara sect believes that on the night of full moon in the month of Kartik, Chandragupta Maurya (founder and ruler of Maurya Empire) saw sixteen dreams, which were then explained to him by Acharya Bhadrabahu.

Dream of Chandragupta	Explanation by Bhadrabahu
The sun setting	All the knowledge will be darkened
A branch of the Kalpavriksha break off and fall	Decline of Jainism and Chandragupta's successors won't be initiated
A divine car descending in the sky and returning	The heavenly beings will not visit Bharata Kshetra
The disk of the moon sundered	Jainism will be split into two sects
Black elephants fighting	Lesser rains and poorer crops
Fireflies shining in the twilight	True knowledge will be lost, few sparks will glimmer with feeble light
A dried up lake	Aryakhanda will be destitute of Jain doctrines and falsehood will increase
Smoke filling all the air	Evil will start to prevail and goodness will be hidden
An ape sitting on a throne	Vile, low-born, wicked will acquire power
A dog eating the payasa out of a golden bowl	Kings, not content with a sixth share, will introduce land-rent and oppress their subjects by increasing it
Young bulls labouring	Young will form religious purposes, but forsake them when old
Kshatriya boys riding donkeys	Kings of high descent will associate with the base
Monkeys scaring away swans	The low will torment the noble and try to reduce them to same level
Calves jumping over the sea	King will assist in oppressing the people by levying unlawful taxes
Foxes pursuing old oxen	The low, with hollow compliments, will get rid of the noble, the good and the wise
A twelve-headed serpent approaching	Twelve year of death and famine will come upon this land

Bhadrabahu was in Nepal for a 12-year penitential vow when the Pataliputra conference took place in 300 BC to put together the Jain canon anew. Bhadrabahu decided the famine would make it harder for monks to survive and migrated with a group of twelve thousand disciples to South India, A 6th-7th century inscription from Shravanabelagola mentions that Chandragupta became a Digambar monk under the guidance of Bhadrabahu, who is referred to in the record as Prabhachandra.

According to the inscriptions at Shravanabelgola, Bhadrabahu died after taking the vow of sallekhana (Fast until death).

Digambara monks belong to the lineage of Acharya Vishakha and Śvetāmbara monks follow the tradition of Acharya Sthulabhadra. However, the theory that the schism occurred at that time has not been historically proven.

== Śvetāmbara biography ==
According to Śvetāmbaras, Bhadrabahusuri was the author of the Kalpa Sūtra, four Cheda sutras, the niryukti collection on ten scriptures, and Uvasaggaharam Stotra. The 10 niryuktis authored by him are: -

1. Āvaśyaka-Niryukti
2. Daśavaikālika-Niryukti
3. Uttarādhyayana-Niryukti
4. Āchārāṅga-Niryukti
5. Sutrakritanga-Niryukti
6. Daśāśrutaskandha-Niryukti
7. Kalpa-Niryukti
8. Vyavahāra-Niryukti
9. Sūryaprajnapti-Niryukti
10. Ṛṣibhāṣita-Niryukti

Śvetāmbaras believe Bhadrabahu's principle disciples were Sthavir Godas, Sthavir Agnidatt, Sthavir Yagnadatt, and Sthavir Somdatt. However, in the Pattavali of Kalpa Sūtra, he is said to have been succeeded by Acharya Sthulabhadrasuri.

He is believed to have been a Sthavirkalpi monk and white-clad as Śvetāmbaras believe that the only other way for monks (known as Jinakalpa) or the practice of being a Jinakalpi monk had become extinct after Jambuswami attained nirvana. Therefore, Śvetāmbaras hold that he was Sthavirkalpi and thus, white-clad.

Śvetāmbaras believe that Bhadrabāhu is the author of the following texts within the official Śvetāmbaras scriptural canon (typically consisting of 45 texts).

- Vyavahāra (3rd Chedasūtra)
- 8th chapter of Daśāśrutaskandha (4th Chedasūtra)
- Kappa (5th Chedasūtra)
- Piṇḍaniryukti (4th Mūlasūtra)
- Oghaniryukti

== Legacy ==
Regarding the inscriptions describing the relation of Bhadrabahu and Chandragupta Maurya, Radha Kumud Mookerji writes,

The oldest inscription of about 600 AD associated "the pair (yugma), Bhadrabahu along with Chandragupta Muni." Two inscriptions of about 900 AD on the Kaveri near Seringapatam describe the summit of a hill called Chandragiri as marked by the footprints of Bhadrabahu and Chandragupta munipati. A Shravanabelagola inscription of 1129 mentions Bhadrabahu "Shrutakevali", and Chandragupta who acquired such merit that he was worshipped by the forest deities. Another inscription of 1163 similarly couples and describes them. A third inscription of the year 1432 speaks of Yatindra Bhadrabahu, and his disciple Chandragupta, the fame of whose penance spread into other words.

— Radha Kumud Mookerji

Bhadrabahu-charitra was written by Ratnanandi of about 1450 AD.

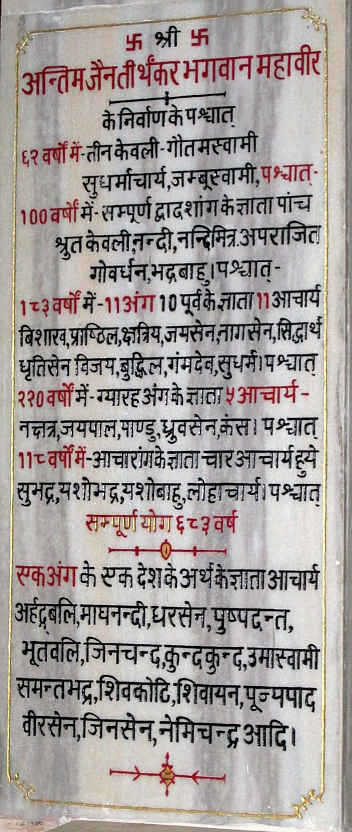
Stella showing the transmission of the oral tradition (Photo: Marhiaji, Jabalpur)

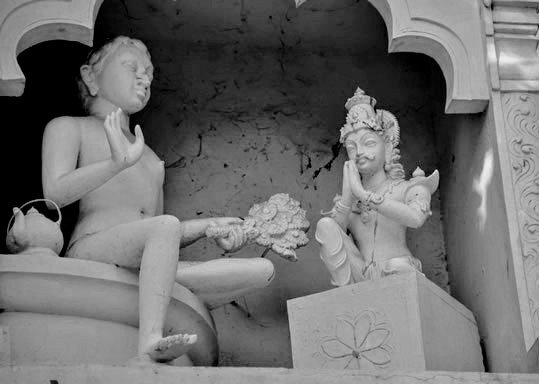
A statue depicting Chandragupta Maurya (right) with his spiritual mentor Acharya Bhadrabahu at Shravanabelagola

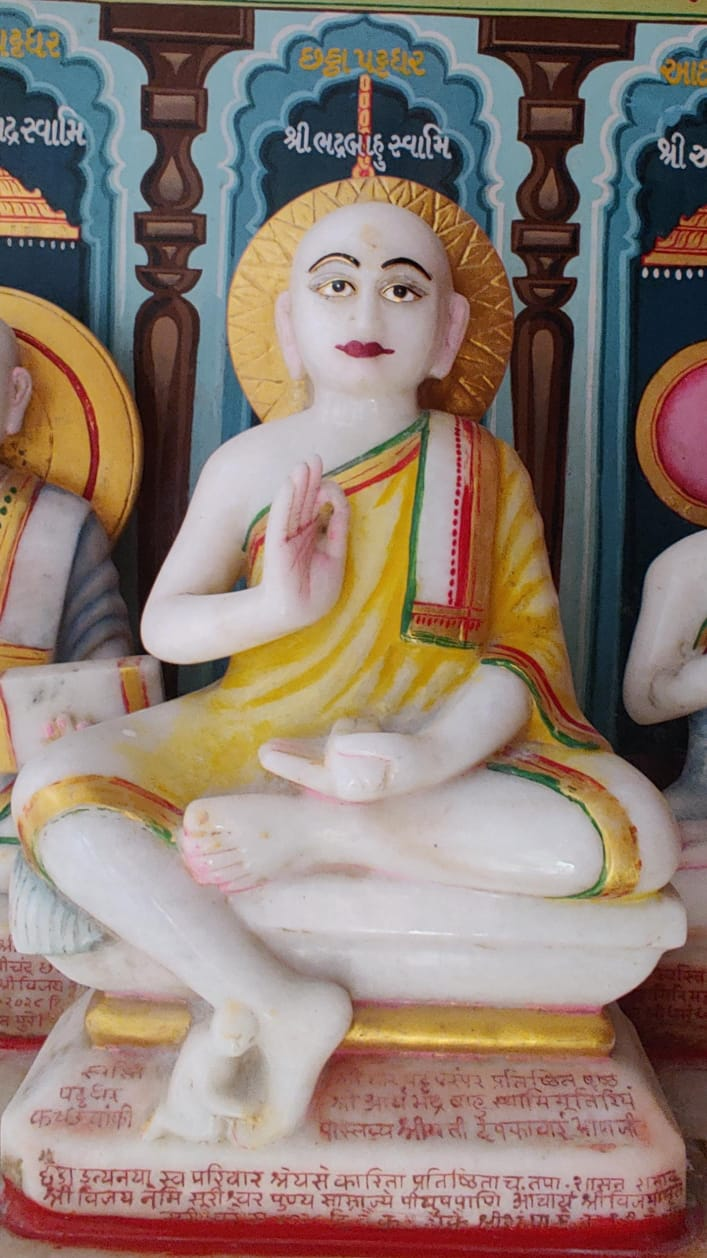
Image of Bhadrabāhu at Kesariyaji Adinath Jain Temple, Palitana

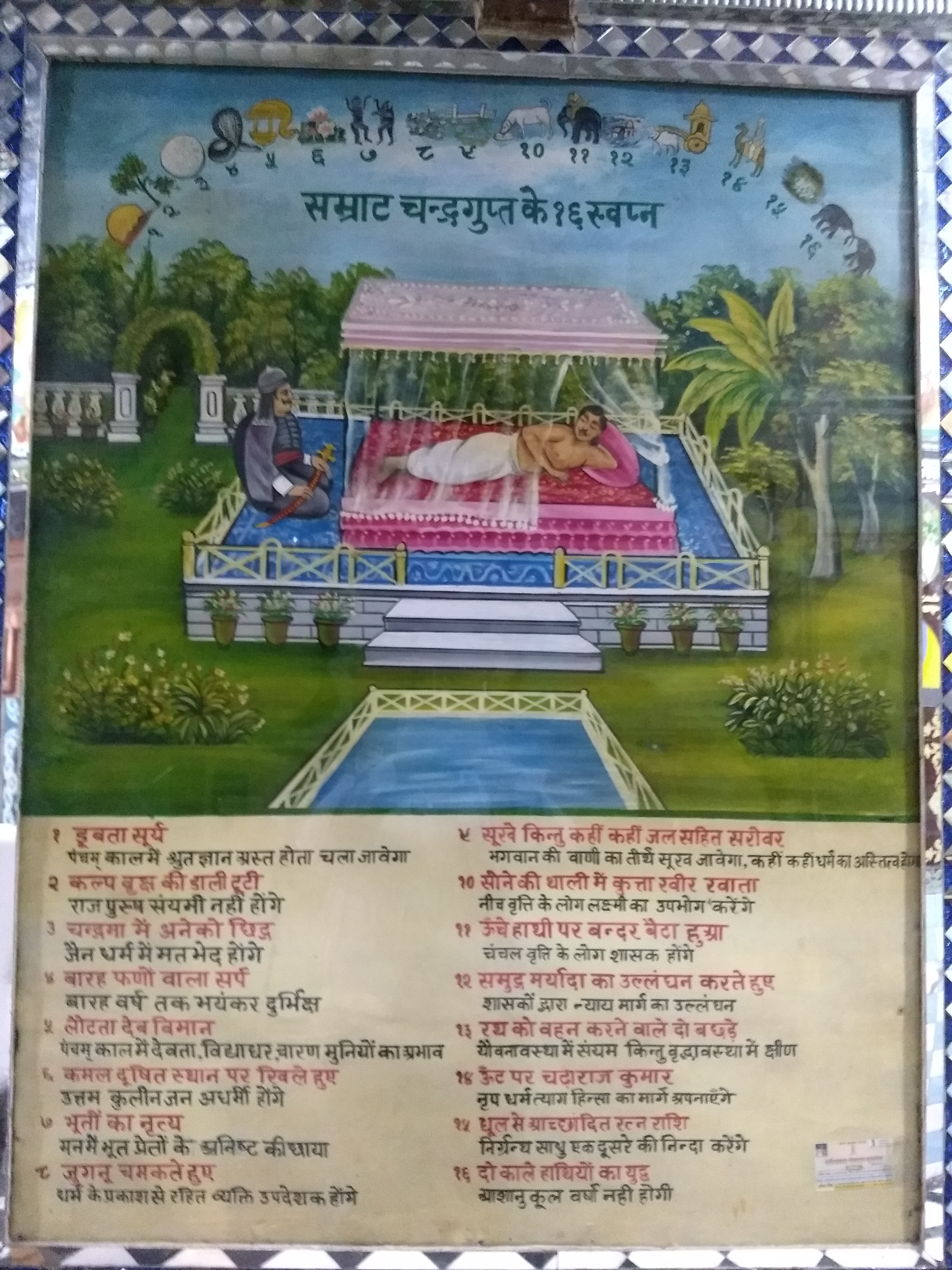
Chandragupta Maurya having 16 auspicious dreams in Jainism

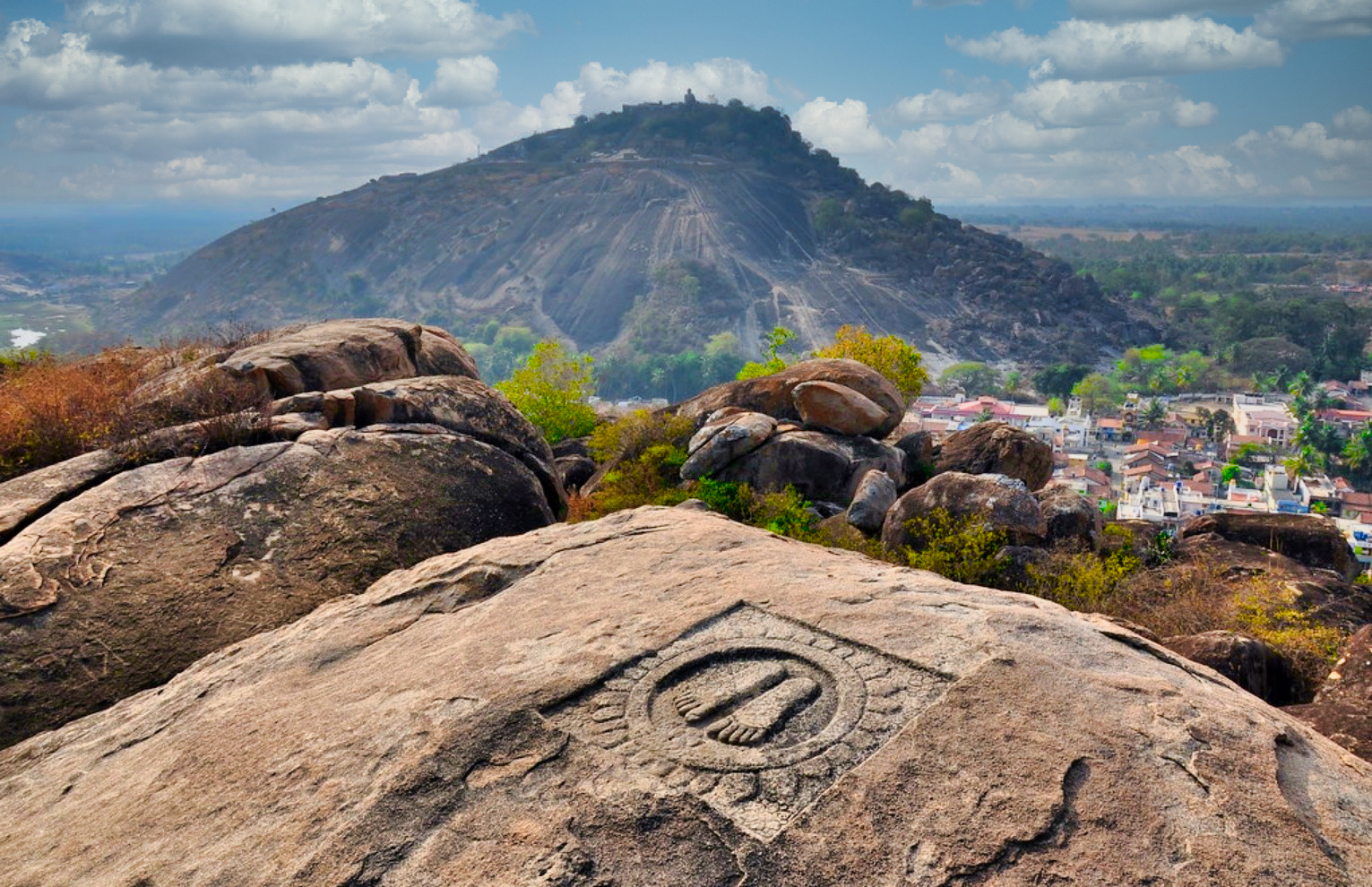
The Footprints of Chandragupta Maurya on Chandragiri Hill, where Chandragupta (the unifier of India and founder of the Maurya Dynasty) performed Sallekhana

== See also ==
Sthulabhadra

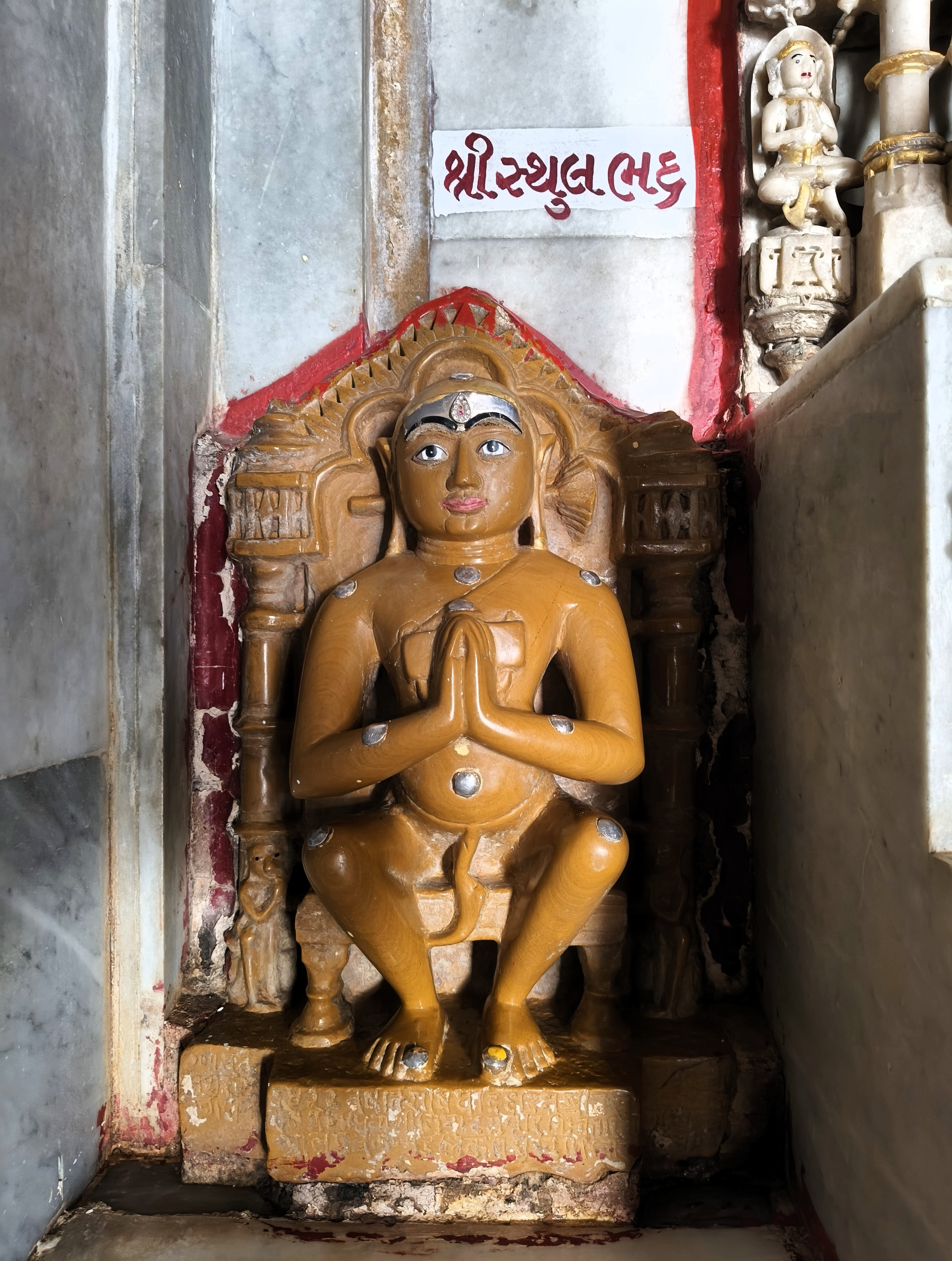
14th century Ārya Sthūlabhadra idol at the Khaḍākhoṭadī no Pāḍo Jaina Temple at Patan
