= Kalpa Sūtra =

Jain manuscript written by Bhadrabahu

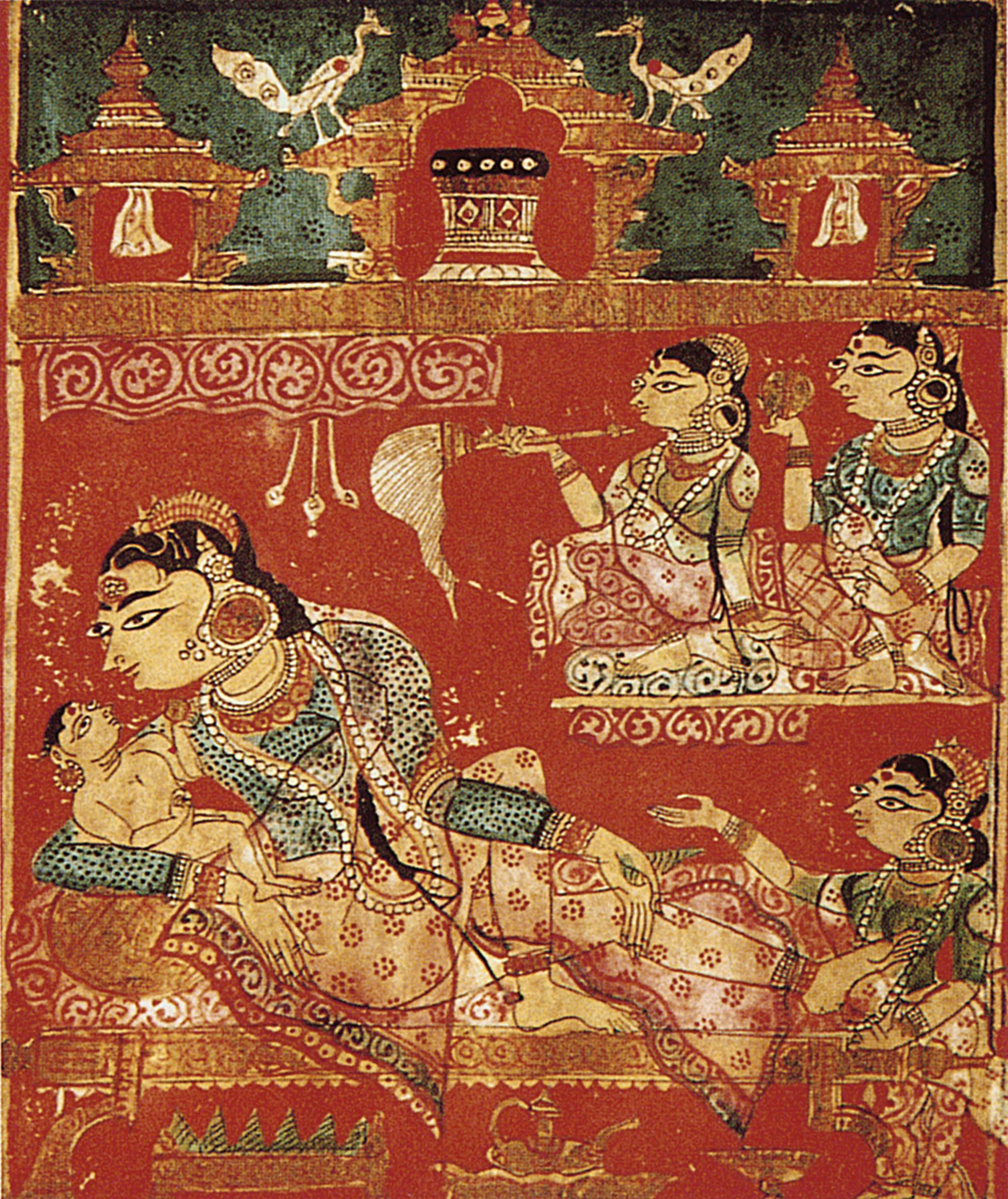
- Detail of a leaf with, The Birth of God Mahavira (the 24th Jain Tirthankara), from the Kalpa Sutra, c.1375–1400.

Information
- Religion: Jainism
- Author: Bhadrabahu

The Kalpa Sūtra (Sanskrit: कल्पसूत्र) is an important Jain scripture containing the biographies of the Tirthankaras, notably Parshvanatha and Mahavira. Ascribed to Acharya Bhadrabahu, which would place it in the 4th century BCE, it states that it was written down 980 or 993 years after the Nirvana (Moksha) of Mahavira or 1230 years after the Nirvana of Tirthankar Parswanath.

== History ==
Within the six sections of the Jain literary corpus belonging to the Śvetāmbara school, it is classed as one of the Cheda Sūtras. This Sutra contains detailed life histories and, from the mid-15th century, was frequently illustrated with miniature painting. The oldest surviving copies are written on paper in western India in the 14th century.

The Kalpa Sutra is ascribed to Acharya Bhadrabahu, the sixth spiritual successor of the great shraman Chaturvidh sangha of Mahavira, who is said to have composed it some 150 years after the Nirvāṇa of Mahavira. It was compiled probably during the reign of Dhruvasena, 980 or 993 years after Mahavira's liberation.

The Kalpa Sutra was one of the first Jain texts to be translated into English.

== Importance ==
The book is read and illustrated in an eight-day-long festival of Paryushan by Jain monks for general people. Only monks are generally permitted to read this scripture, as in Jainism, this text has very high spiritual values and sanctity.

The sound of the words alone, even without reflection on the meaning, is considered to transform the listener's soul.

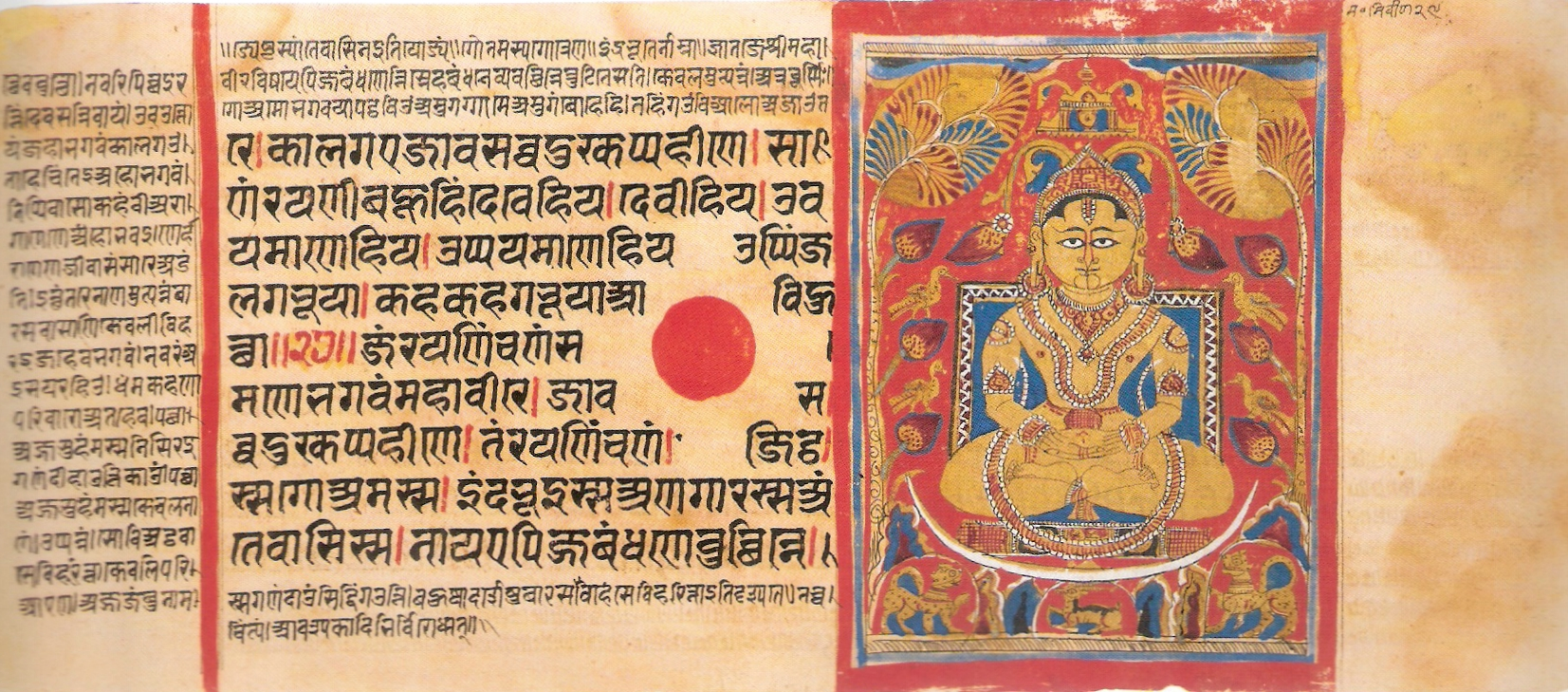
Kalpasutra folio on Mahavira Nirvana. Note the crescent-shaped Siddhashila, a place where all siddhas reside after Nirvana.

== Contents ==
The Kalpa Sutra mentions nine Ganas and 11 Ganadharas of Mahavira. Gautama Swami is mentioned as prime Ganadhara of Mahavira. Acharya Bhadrabahu's disciple Godasa is mentioned to have founded Godasa Gana.

The text includes the biography of Mahavira, of the twenty-four jinas, and of the lineage of mendicants who followed Mahavir.

== See also ==
- Neminatha
- Parshvanatha
