= Jambuswami =

Head of Shraman Sangha of Mahavira (543–449 BCE)

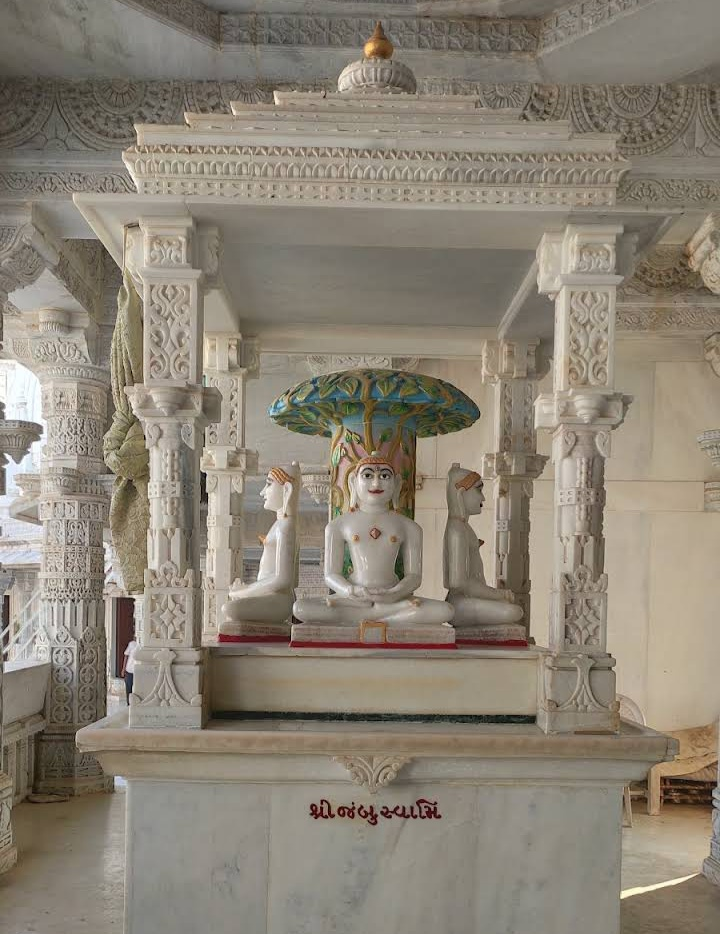
- Jambu Swami 72 Jinalay Mandvi Kutch
- Venerated in: Jainism
- Predecessor: Sudharmaswami
- Successor: Prabhava

Genealogy
- Born: 543 BCE
- Died: 449 BCE
- Parents: Rushabadatt/Arhadas (father); Dharini/Jinmati (mother)
- Consorts: Eight wives, including Padamshri, Kamalshri, Vinayshri and Roopshri

Jambuswami (543–449 BCE), or simply Jambu, was the last kevali (omniscient one) in Jain tradition to attain moksha (liberation) in the present half time-cycle of Jainism. The spiritual successor of Sudharmaswami, he headed Mahavira’s sangha (religious order) for thirty-nine or forty-four years, attaining kevala jñāna before departing from his leadership.

Jambu was succeeded by Prabhava (443-338 BCE), who was converted from banditry by him. Prabhava was then succeeded by Shayyambhava (377-315 BCE), who composed the Dasavaikalika sutra after studying the fourteen purvas (pre-canonical texts) and initiated both himself and his son Manaka as Jain monks. Manaka was initiated as a monk at the age of eight and was taught by his father sacred knowledge in ten lectures in six months, after which he passed away.

Shayyambhava was succeeded by Yasobhadra (351-235 BCE), who was then succeeded by his two disciples, Sambhutavijaya (347-257 BCE) and Bhadrabahu (322-243 BCE).

== Jain traditional biography ==
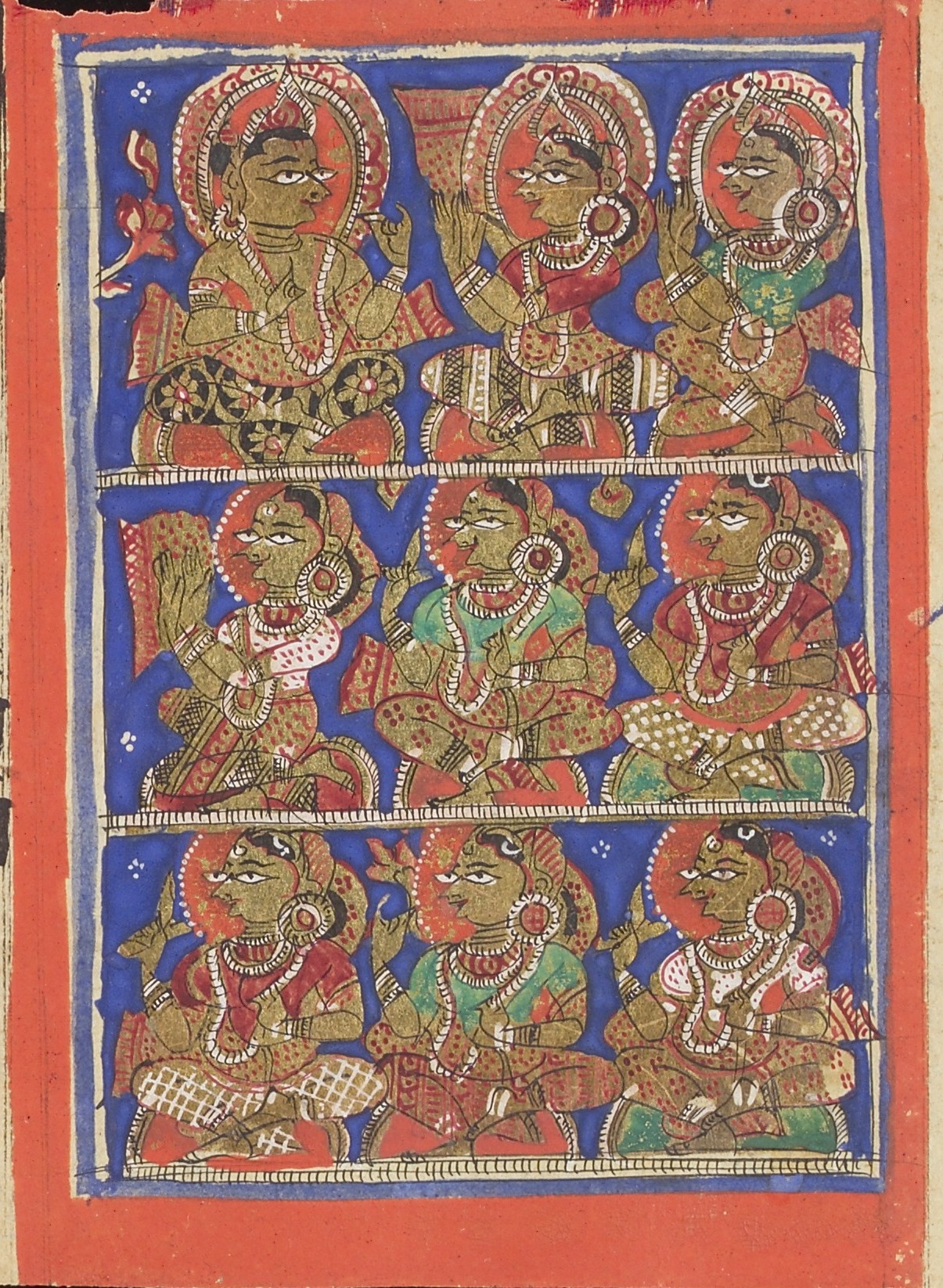
Jambuswami convinces his eight wives so he can renounce his worldly life, a tale from the Kalpa Sūtra

=== Early life & pre-renunciation ===
Traditional Jain sources dictate that Jambuswami was born to Rushabhadatt (or Arhadas) and Dharini (or Jinmati), two wealthy merchants located in the city of Rajgruhi, on the last day of the Falgun month. Jambu’s parents rejoiced in their son’s intelligence and he grew up to be a very liked figure in his community, causing many local families to engage their daughters with him. In spite of these material fortunes, Jambu was not pleased with his status, and made it his effort to convince his eight wives to renunciate their possessions and become ascetics.

=== Renunciation ===
Jambuswami managed to convince his eight wives to renounce worldly pleasures with him. As a result of his words, Prabhava was converted from banditry, and both Jambu and his wives’ parents were all also convinced to become Jain ascetics. Organising a community of over five-hundred ascetics, he and his peers were consecrated by Sudharmaswami, and when Sudharma attained omniscience, Jambu succeeded his position. Jambuswami himself attained kevala jñāna (omniscience) circa the age of thirty-six. He later attained moksha (liberation) at the age of eighty-four at Mathura Chaursai.

== Temples and legacy ==
Mathura Chaurasi Digamber Jain Mandir in Uttar Pradesh stands as a premier center for worship of Jambuswami. This temple complex features a white marble idol of Ajitanatha, the second tirthankara, as its primary enshrined deity (moolnayak), which was historically recovered during an archaeological excavation in Gwalior.

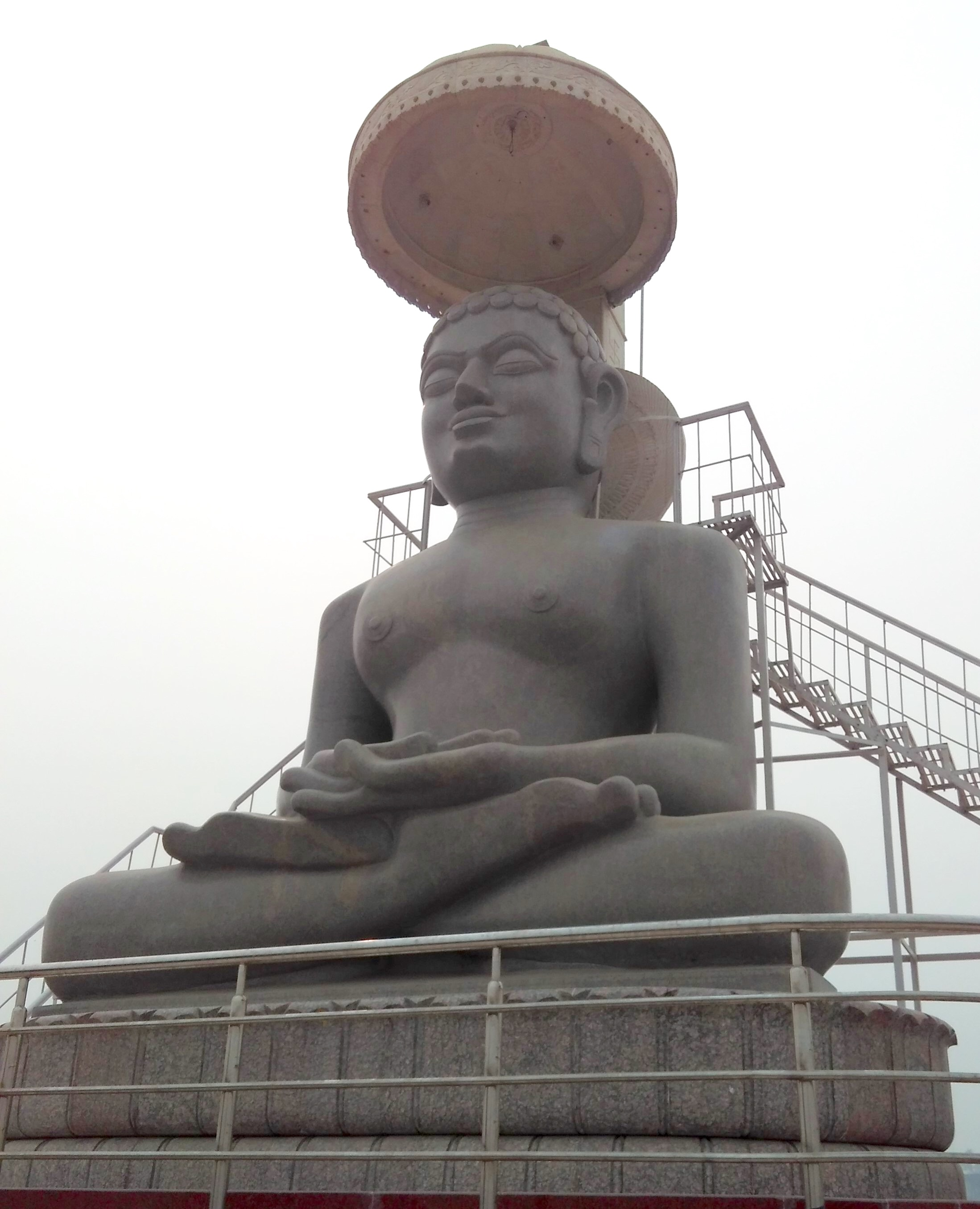

The site is also deeply revered within Jain universal history as the exact location where Jambuswami (the final omniscient being, or Kevali, of the current cosmic age) attained ultimate liberation (moksha), with his venerated footprints (charan) actively worshipped alongside Ajitanatha's idol.

== See also ==
- Devardhigani Kshamashraman
- Hemachandra
- Hiravijaya
