= Sudharmaswami =

6th century BC Indian Jain monk

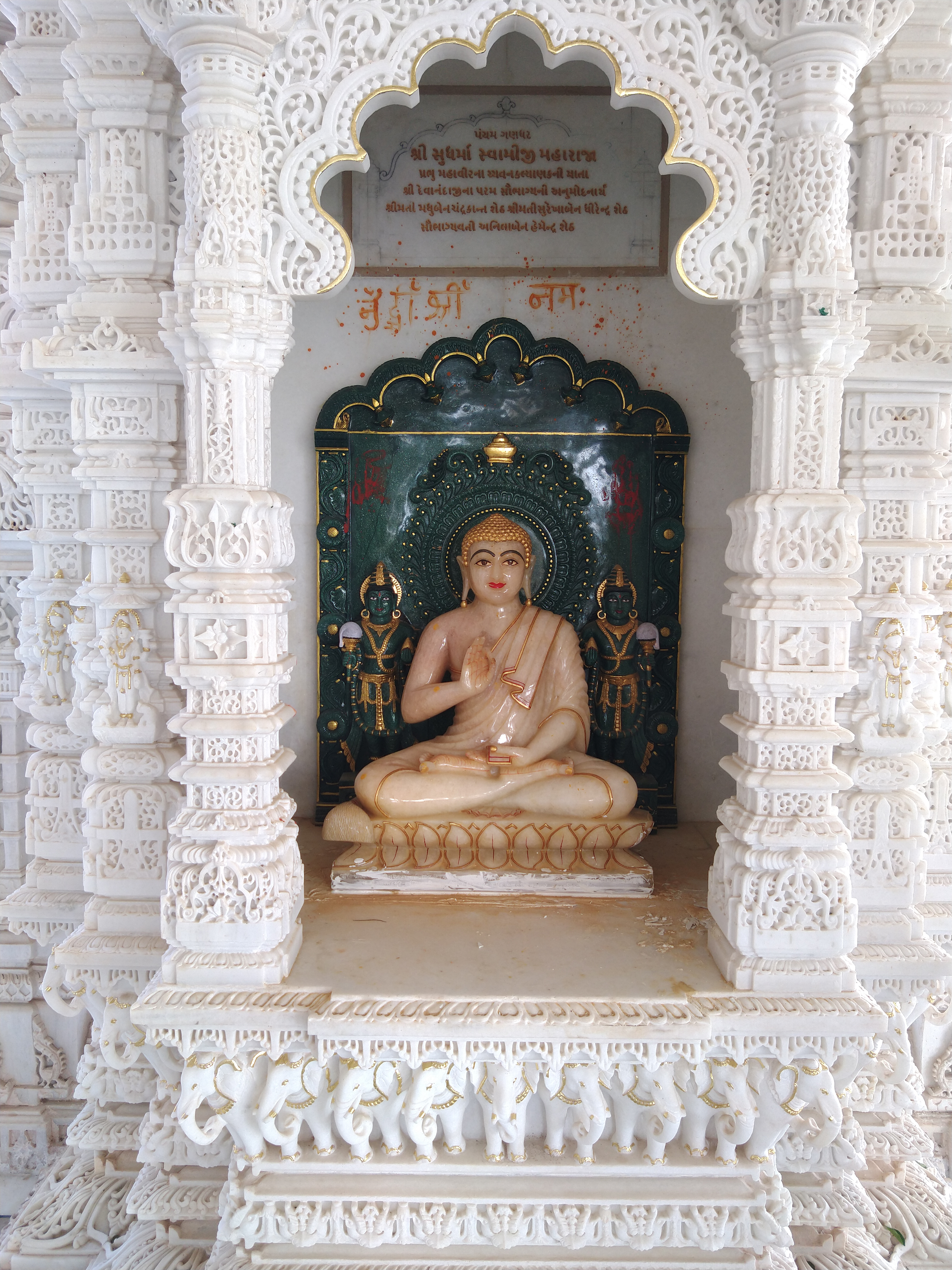
- Idol of Sudharmaswami in Rujuwalika Jain Temple in Jharkhand
- Venerated in: Jainism

Genealogy
- Avatar birth: 607 BC
- Avatar end: 507 BC
- Parents: Rajanswami (adoptive father/uncle) Sampurn (father); Prithvidarshyānā (mother)

Sudharmaswami (Sanskrit: Sudharmāsvāmī or Sudharman; 607 BC – 507 BC) was the fifth ganadhara of Mahavira. All the current Jain acharyas and monks follow his rule.

== Life ==
Sudharmaswami was the spiritual successor of Indrabhuti Gautama in religious order reorganised by Mahavira. He is traditionally dated from 607 to 507 BC. In the Jain tradition he is believed to have obtained omniscience after 12 years in 515 BC. He is believed to have attained nirvana in 507 BC at the age of 100. The leadership of religious order was then transferred to Jambuswami who served for 44 years and was the last omniscient (not Gandhara) who survived after the death of Mahavira.

For Jains, their scriptures represent the literal words of Mahavira and the other tirthankaras only to the extent that the agama texts are a series of fixed truths without a beginning or an end, and a tradition without any origin, human or divine, which in this world age has been channelled through Sudharmasvāmī.

== See also ==
- Devardhigani Kshamashraman
- Hemachandra
- Hiravijaya
