= Gautama Swami =

Mahavira's Ganadhara

Indrabhuti Gautama
- 1st Ganadhara of Tirthankara Mahavira
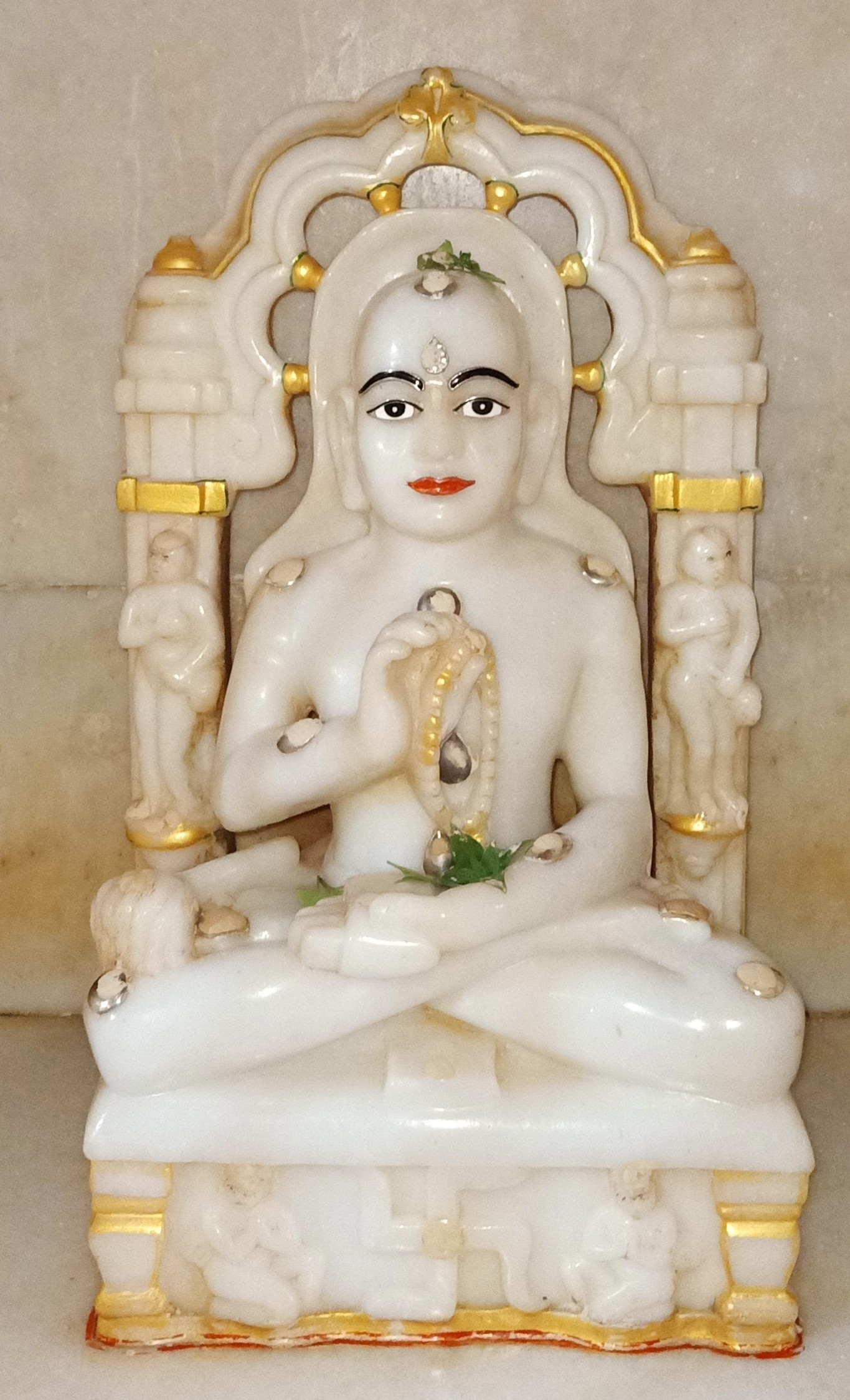
- An idol of Gautama Swami
- Successor: Sudharmaswami
- Age: 92

Genealogy
- Parents: Vasubhūti (father); Prithvī (mother)

Gautama Swami, born as Indrabhuti Gautama was the first Ganadhara (chief disciple) of Mahavira, the 24th and last Jain Tirthankara of present half cycle of time. He is also referred to as Guru Gautama, Gautama Ganadhara, and Ganadhara Gautama Swami.

== Life ==
Gautama was born in the village of Gorbara in Magadha to a father named Vasubhūti and a mother named Prtvhī. Gautama was the senior-most of 11 ganadharas (chief disciples) of Mahavira. He had two brothers Agnibhuti and Vayubhuti who also became ganadhara of Mahavira. Other ganadhara were Vyakta, Sudharmaswami, Mandikata, Mauryaputra, Akampita, Acalabharata, Metarya and Prabhasa. A stone pillar of Utaroda mentions Mahagiri as one of Ganadharas of Mahavira who had Utara as his chief disciple.

In Jain traditional accounts, Gautama is believed to have gained Kevala Jnana (omniscience) immediately after the moksha (liberation) of Mahavira. He was succeeded by Sudharmaswami who is believed to have gained omniscience after a further 12 years.

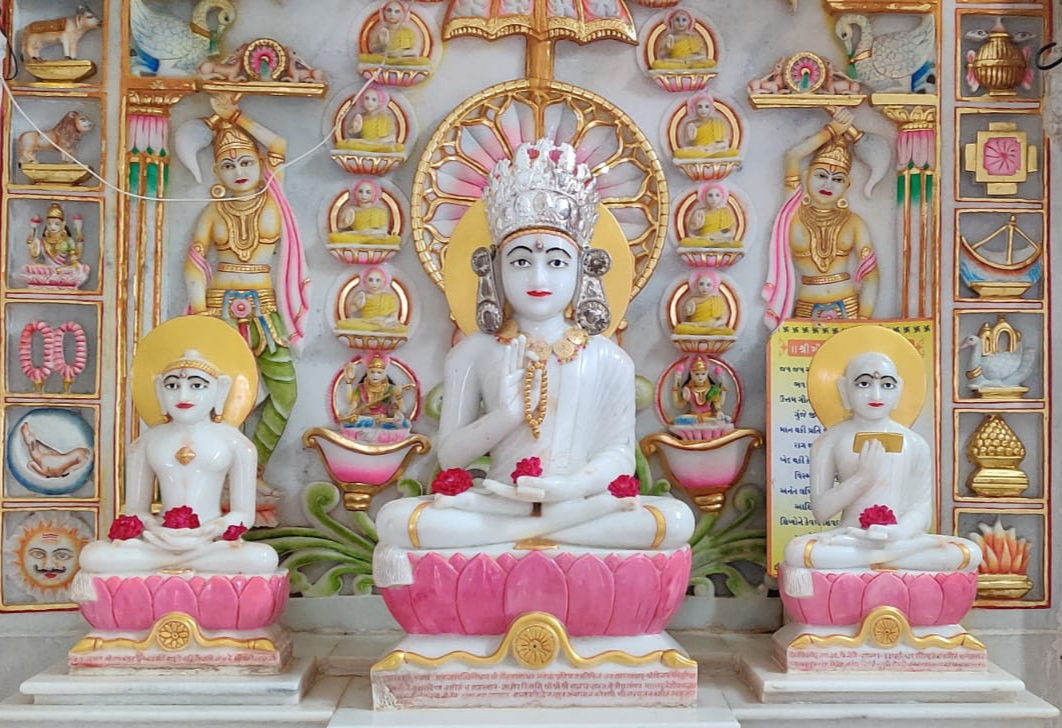
Idols of Gautam Swami (center), Sudharma Swami (right) & Pundrik Swami (left) at Shree Samavasarna Maha Mandir, Aagashi, Virar

According to the elaboration of Debate with the Ganadhara by Jinabhadra, the learned Brahmin Gautama summoned the gods to a great sacrifice but instead they flew off to hear Mahavira preaching at his second samavasarana near by. In fury, Gautama confronted Mahavira in debate, as did ten other brahmins in succession, with the fordmaker converting them all by a demonstration, underpinned by his claim to omniscience. According to Svetambara texts, Gautama had a meeting with Keśī (ganadhara of Parshvanatha). Svetambaras write Gautama's name in new account books as a sign of auspiciousness in the new year.

Gautama is connected with prosperity as he fed some monks using his magical powers. Gautama is mentioned in the Exposition of Explanations, as an interpreter of Mahavira. It is further mentioned that they have been friends in their previous incarnations and will attain moksha in the one which they are now.

== Gallery ==
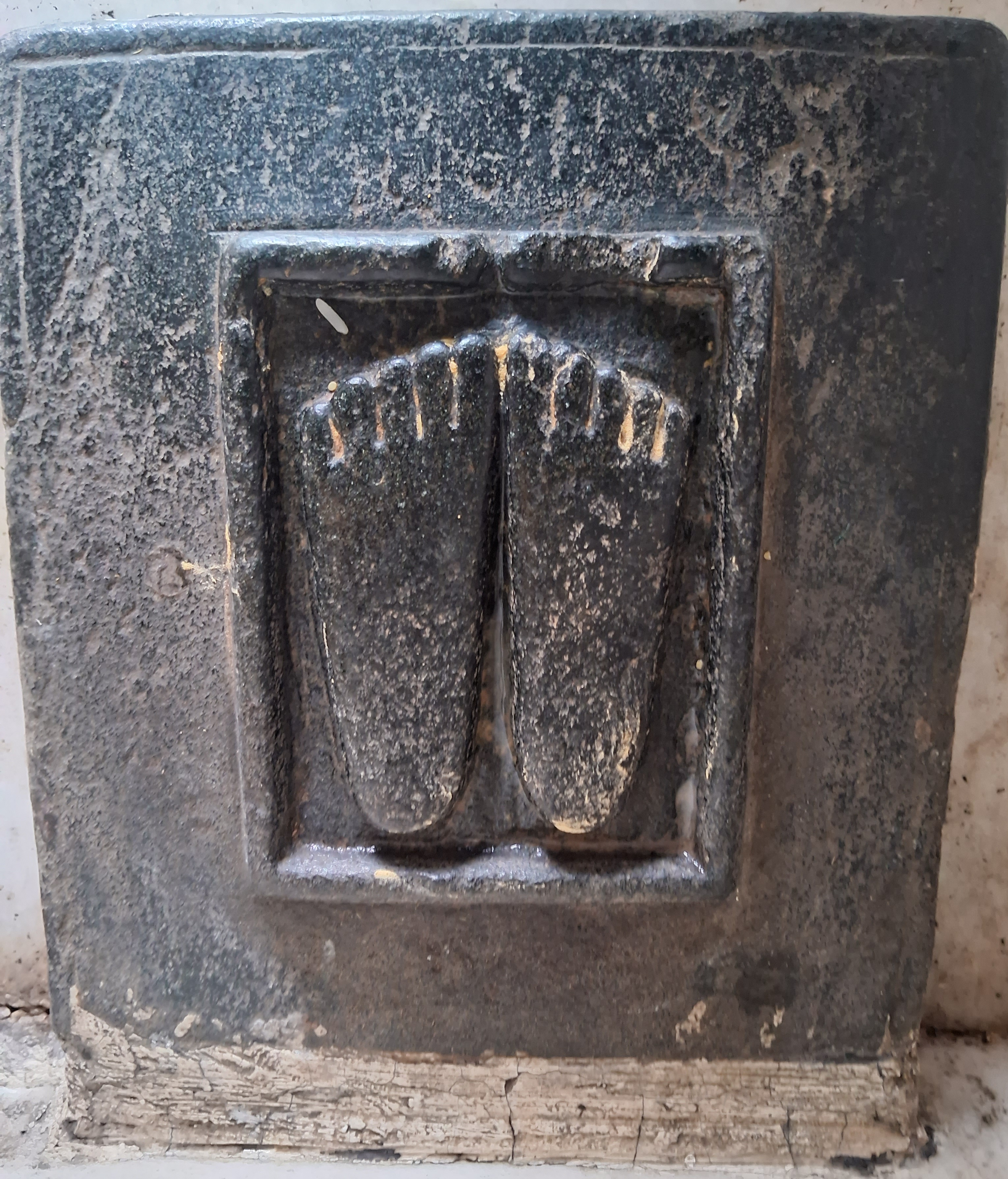
Gautama's footprints at Shikharji

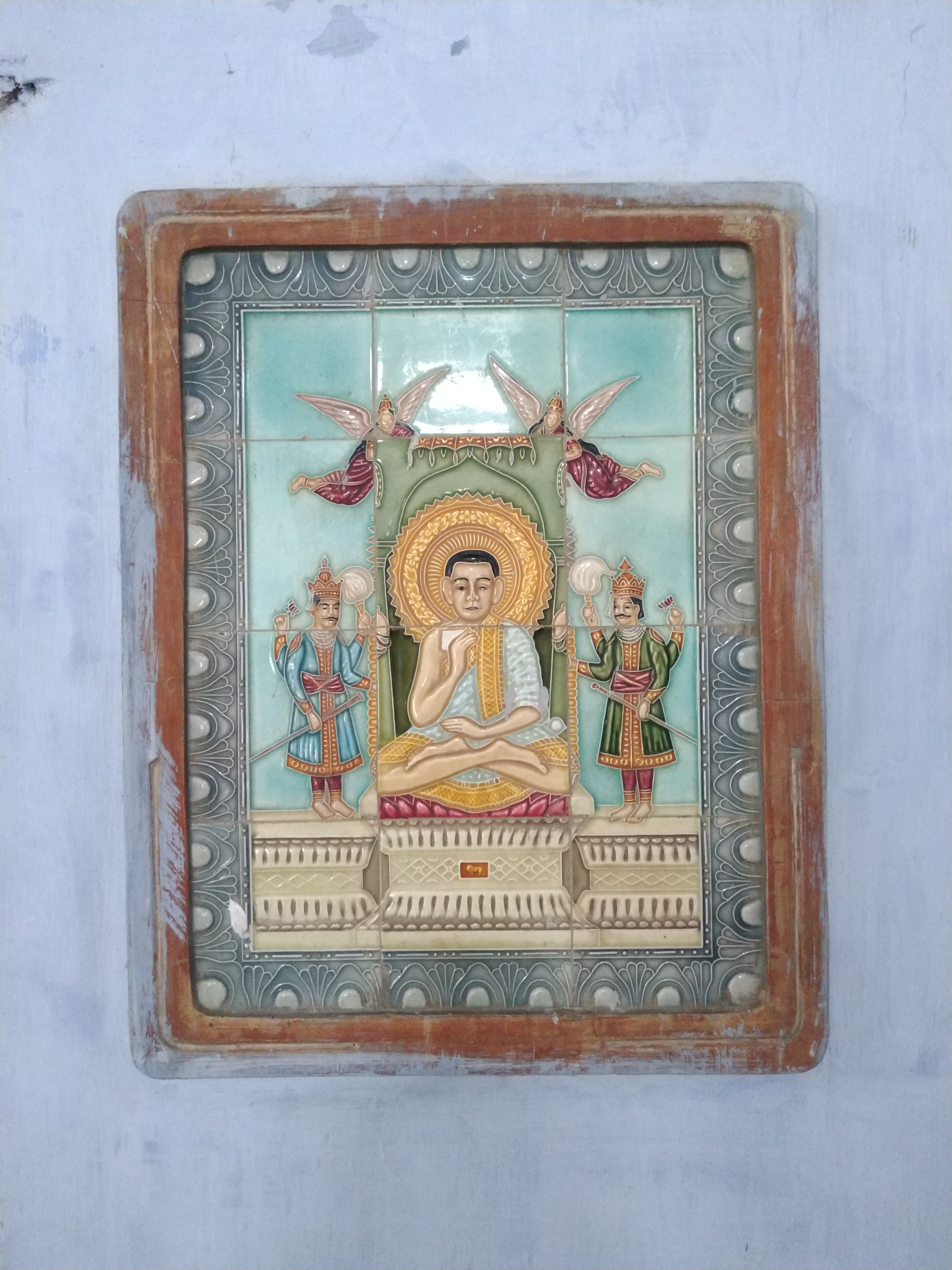
Gautam Swami tile art at Dadawadi Jain temple in Mehsana

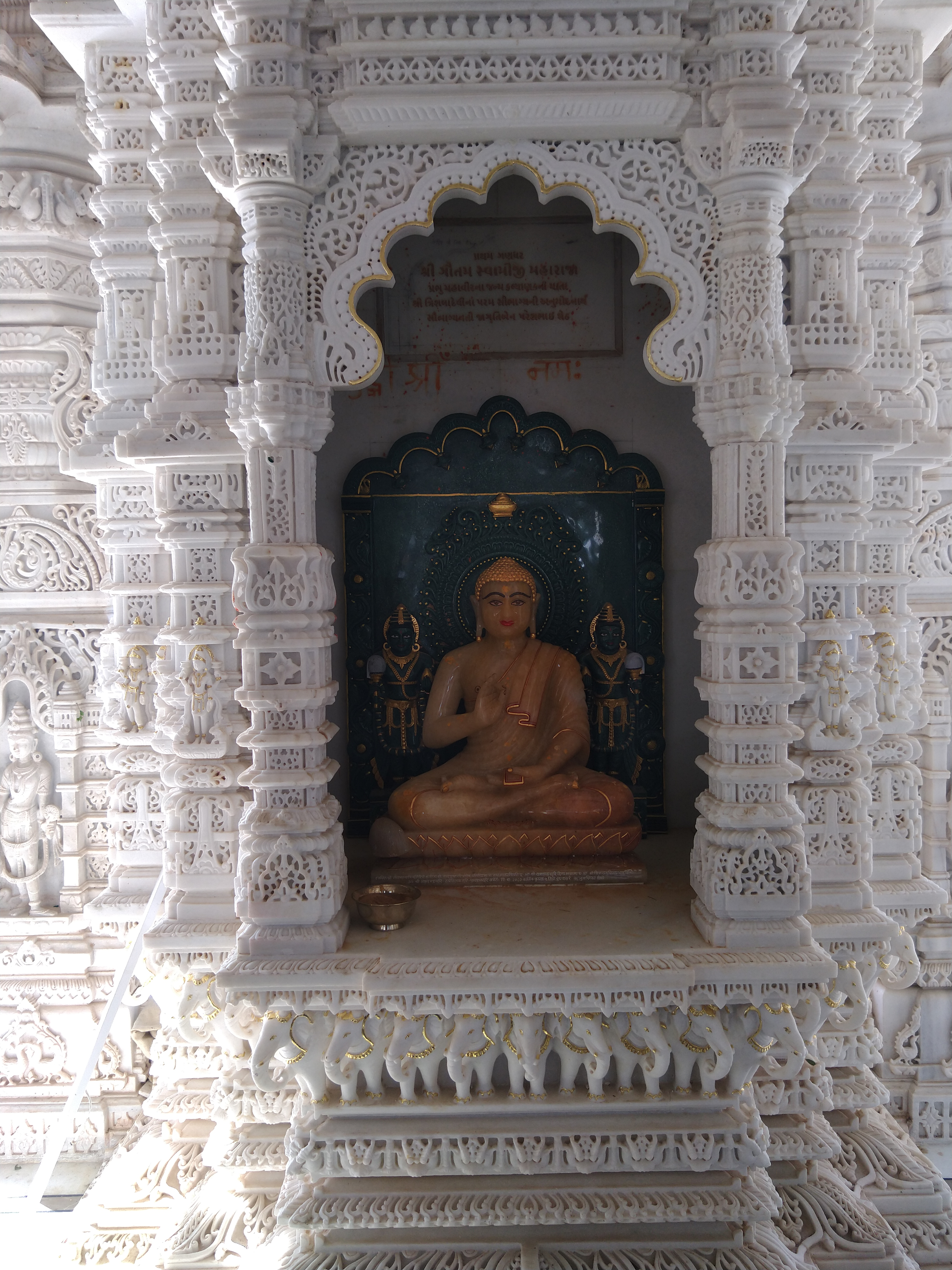
Idol of shree Gautamswami at Mahavira Kaivalya bhumi Rujuwalika Mahatirth

== See also ==
- Devardhigani Kshamashraman
- Hemachandra
- Hiravijaya
