= Jainism in Maharashtra =

Marathi Jain
Marathi Jain
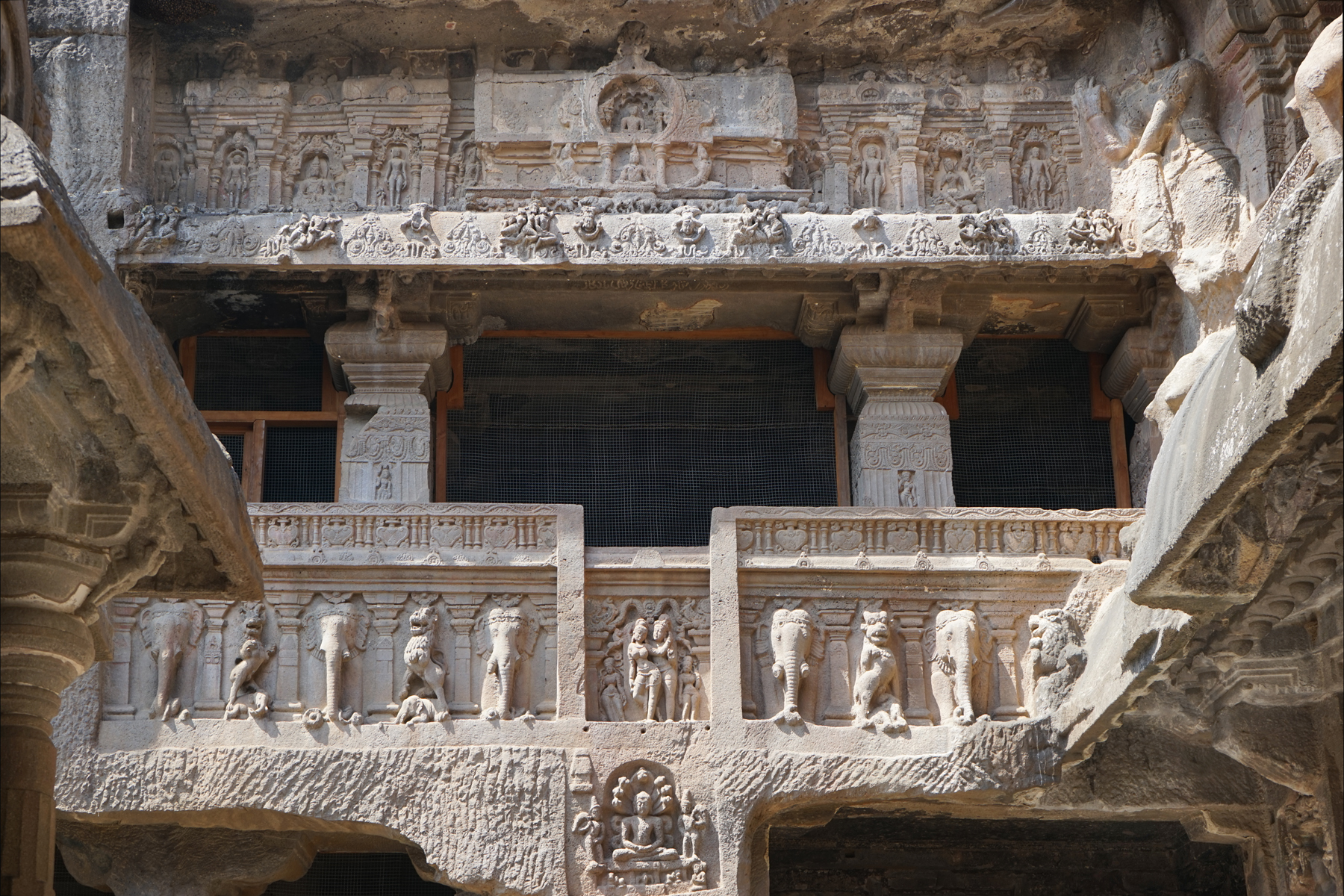
- Indra Sabha, Ellora Caves

Regions with significant populations
- India; Maharashtra

Languages
- Marathi and Kannada

Religion
- Jainism

Jainism has been present in Maharashtra since ancient times. The famous Ellora Caves demonstrate that Jainism was part of a thriving religious culture in Maharashtra in premodern times.

== History ==
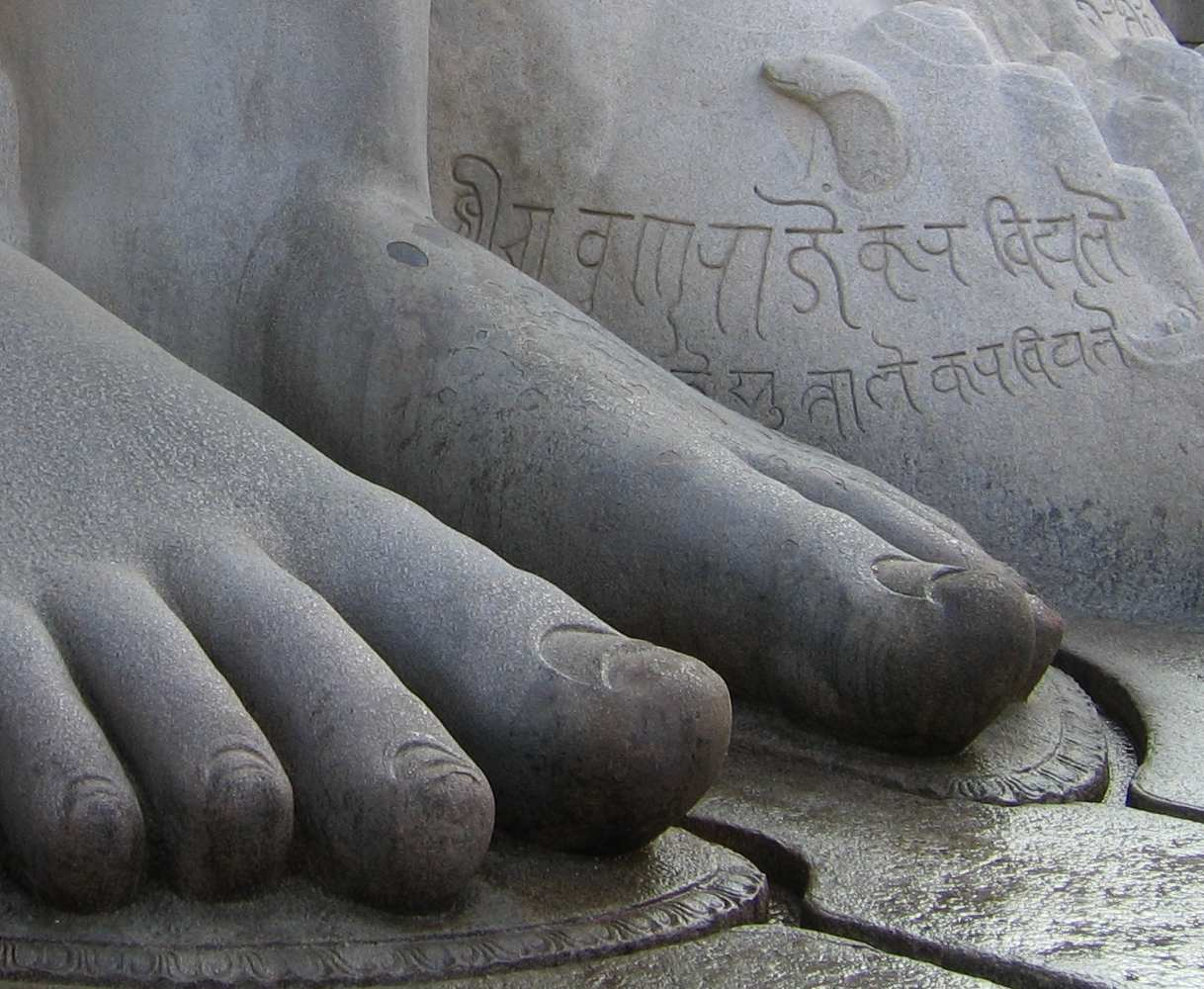
981 A.D. Marathi inscription at the foot of Bahubali statue at Jain temple in Shravanabelagola is one of the earliest known Marathi inscription found. It was derived from Jain-Prakrit language.

Jainism in Maharashtra has a long history. The oldest inscription in Maharashtra is a 2nd-century BC Jain inscription in a cave near Pale village in the Pune District. It was written in the Jain Prakrit and includes the Navkar Mantra. The first Marathi inscription known is at Shravanabelagola, Karnataka near the left foot of the statue of Bahubali, dated 981 CE.

Jainism in Maharashtra was patronised by many rulers such kings from the Shilaharas and Rashtrakuta. Many of forts were built by kings from these dynasties and thus Jain temples or their remains are found in them. Texts such as the Shankardigvijaya and Shivlilamruta suggest that a large number of Marathi people followed Jainism in the ancient period.

== Jain communities in present day Maharashtra ==
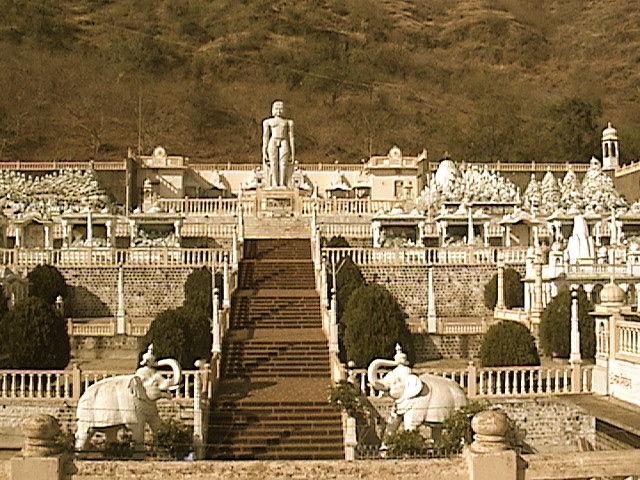
Kumbhoj Jain temple

There are many native Jain communities in present day Maharashtra. The communities tend to be endogamous, and generally do not intermarry with the Jains who have arrived from North India. They belong to the Digambar sect. The four largest communities by numbers are:

- Saitwal, originally Tailors and Cloth Merchants
- Chaturtha, originally agriculturists, now engaged in various professions
- Panchama, various professions
- Kasar, traditionally coppersmiths

Each of the above communities are affiliated to their own Matha and led by the Matha leader called Bhattaraka. In addition to the above four, there are several smaller native Maharashtrian Jain communities.

- Upajjhaya
- Kamboja
- Harada
- Jabade, Jain community in Maharashtra
- Dhakad A small Jain community found primarily in Western Vidarbha districts of Akola, Yavatmal, Washim and Amravati.

== Religious organizations ==
The Dakshin Bharat Jain Sabha, Veer Seva Dal are religious and social service organization of the Jains of South India. The organization is headquartered at Kolhapur, Maharashtra, India. The association is credited with being one of the first Jain associations to start reform movements among the Jains in modern India. The organization mainly seeks to represent the interests of the native Jains of Maharashtra (Marathi Jains) and Karnataka (Kannada Jains).

== Jain Tirthas and Temples ==
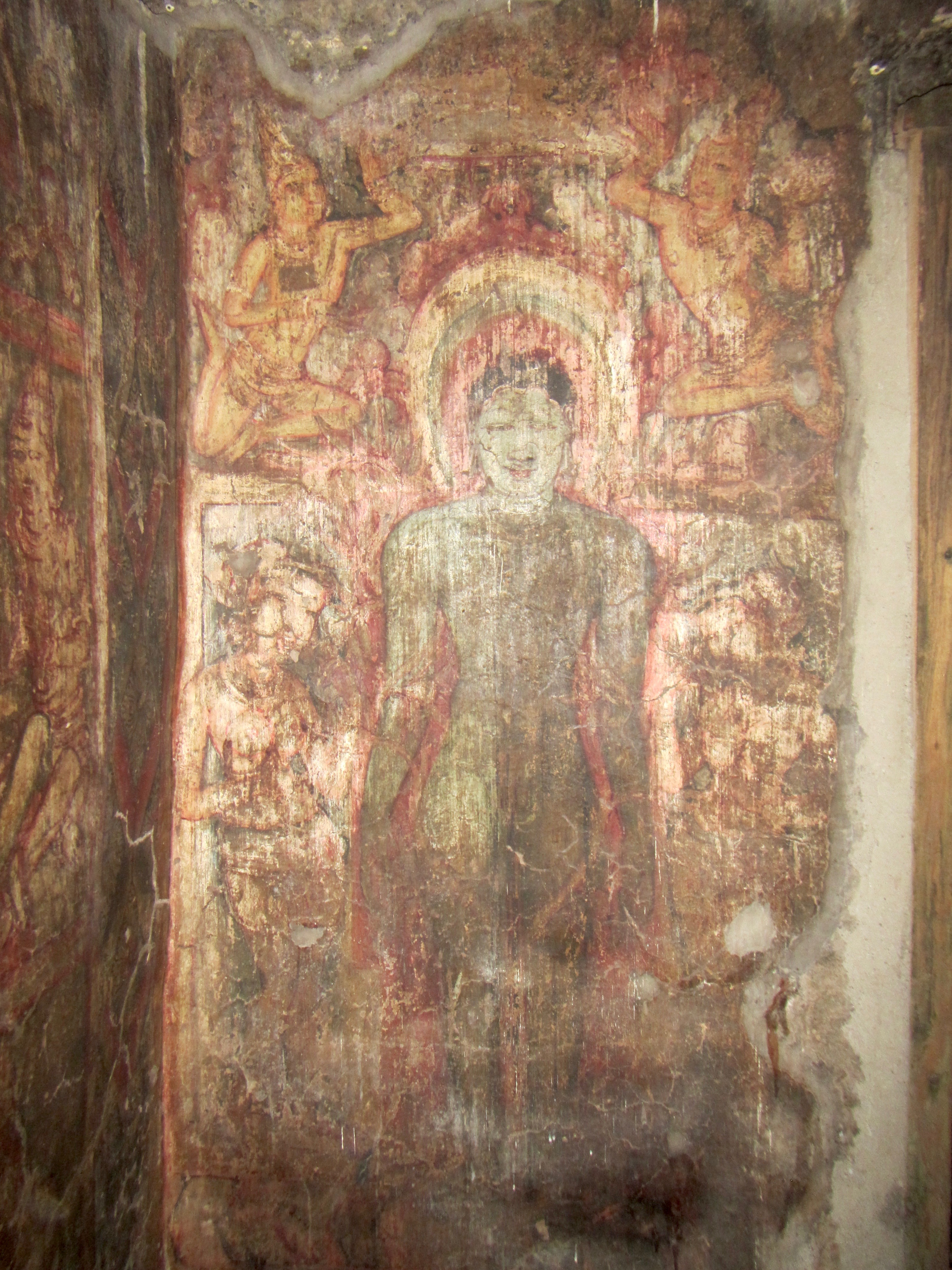
Painting inside Indra Sabha cave at Ellora Caves

Cave temple

- Ellora Jain Caves
- Nasik Caves
- Manmodi Caves
- Mangi-Tungi
- Tringalwadi Jain Cave
- Pale Jain cave
- Lohagadwadi caves
- Ankai Jain cave

Main temple

- Shantinath Jain Teerth
- Gajpanth
- Kumbhoj Jain temple, Kumbhoj
- Shantinath Jain Teerth
- Shantinath temple, Ramtek
- Jahaj Mandir, Mandwala
- Jintur
- Godiji Parshwanath Temple, Mumbai
- Nemgiri in Parbhani district
- Katraj Tirth
- Babu Amichand Panalal Adishwarji Jain Temple, Walkeshwar
- Antarikṣa Pārśvanātha Śvetāmbara Tīrtha
- Shree Vimalnath Bhagwan Tirth, Sakri
- Shirpurji teerth, Dhule district, Nashik
- Pashvanath Jain Temple, Nijampur Dhule
- Shri 1008 Mallinath Digamber Jain Atishaya Kshetra, Shirad Shahpur
- Shri vimalnatha swami Jain shwetambar temple in Bibwewadi
- Kachner Jain temple in Aurangabad, Maharashtra
- Paithan Jain Tirth
- Trimurti Digambar Jain Mandir in Sanjay Gandhi National Park, Borivali
- Shree Mahavir Jain Temple in Pimpri-Chinchwad near Pune
- Shri Digamber Jain Siddha Kshetra Kunthalgiri, Dist. Osmanabad, Maharashtra

Shri Kalikund Parshwanatha Digambar Jain Kshetra, Kundal Sangli.

== Gallery ==
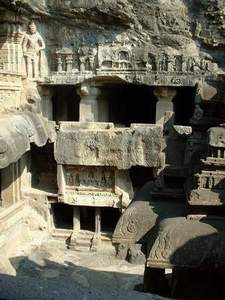
Jain cave in Ellora

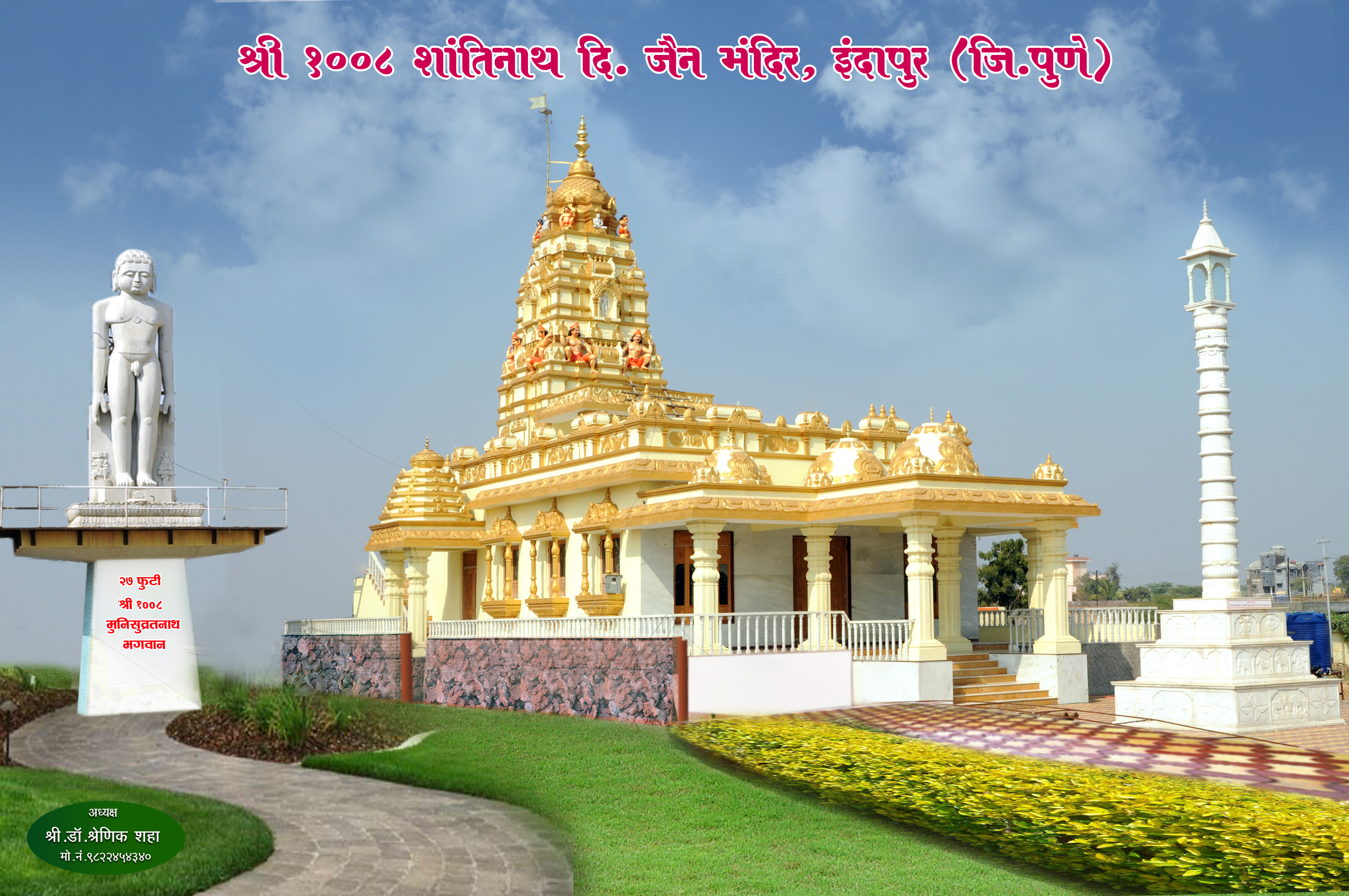
Shantinath Jain Teerth, Indapur, Pune

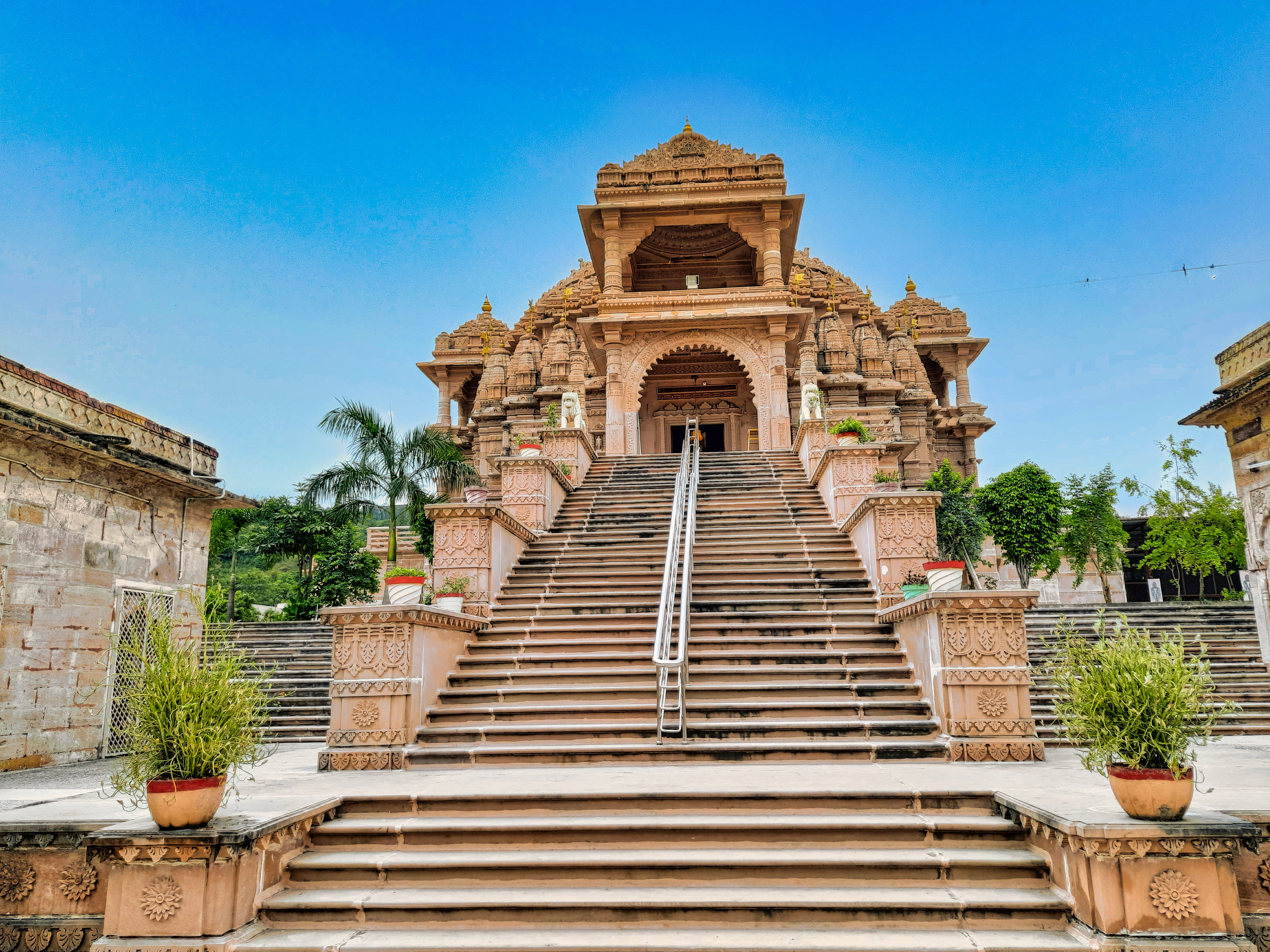
Shantinath temple, Ramtek

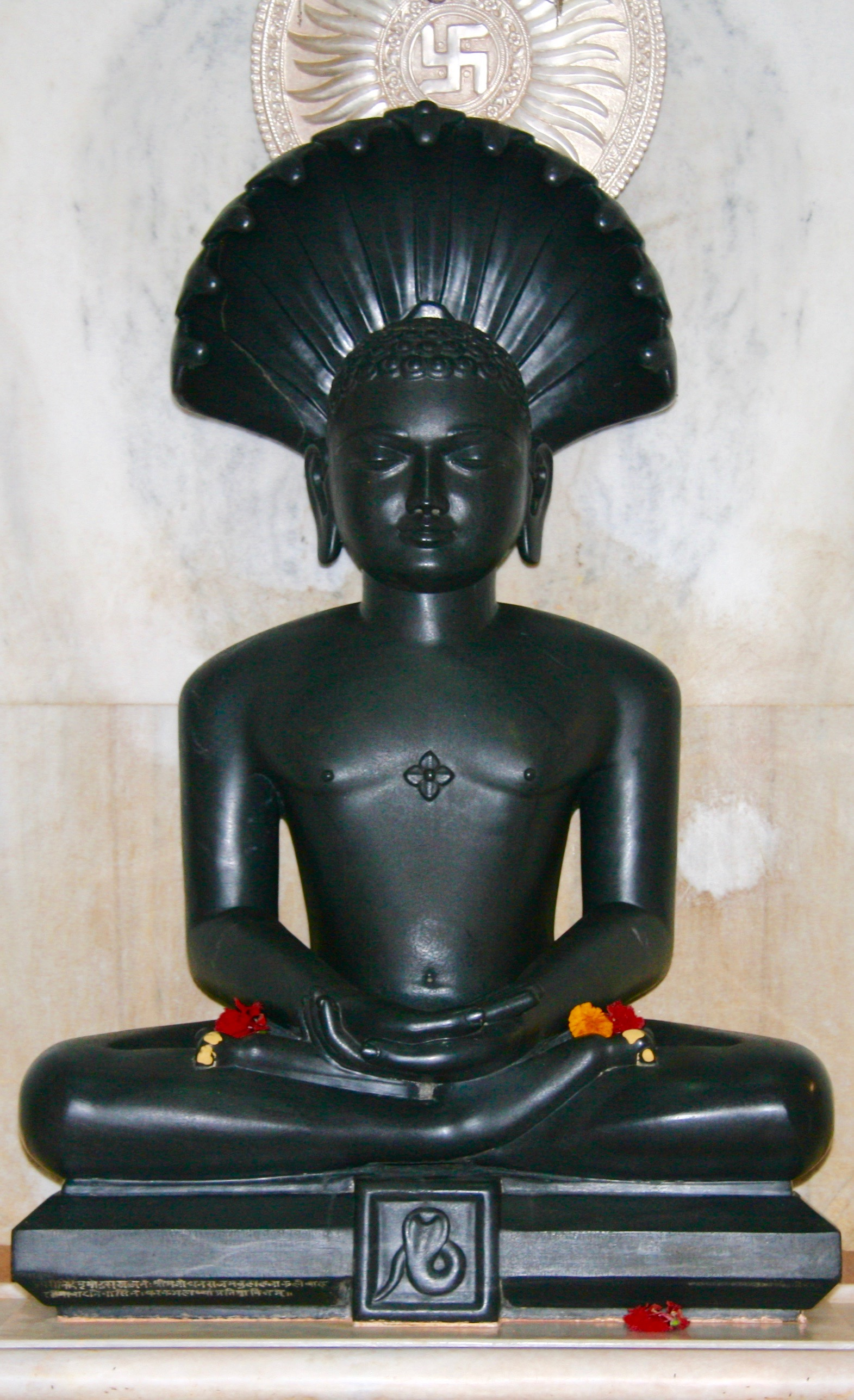
Idol of Lord Shri Parshvanath at Kachner

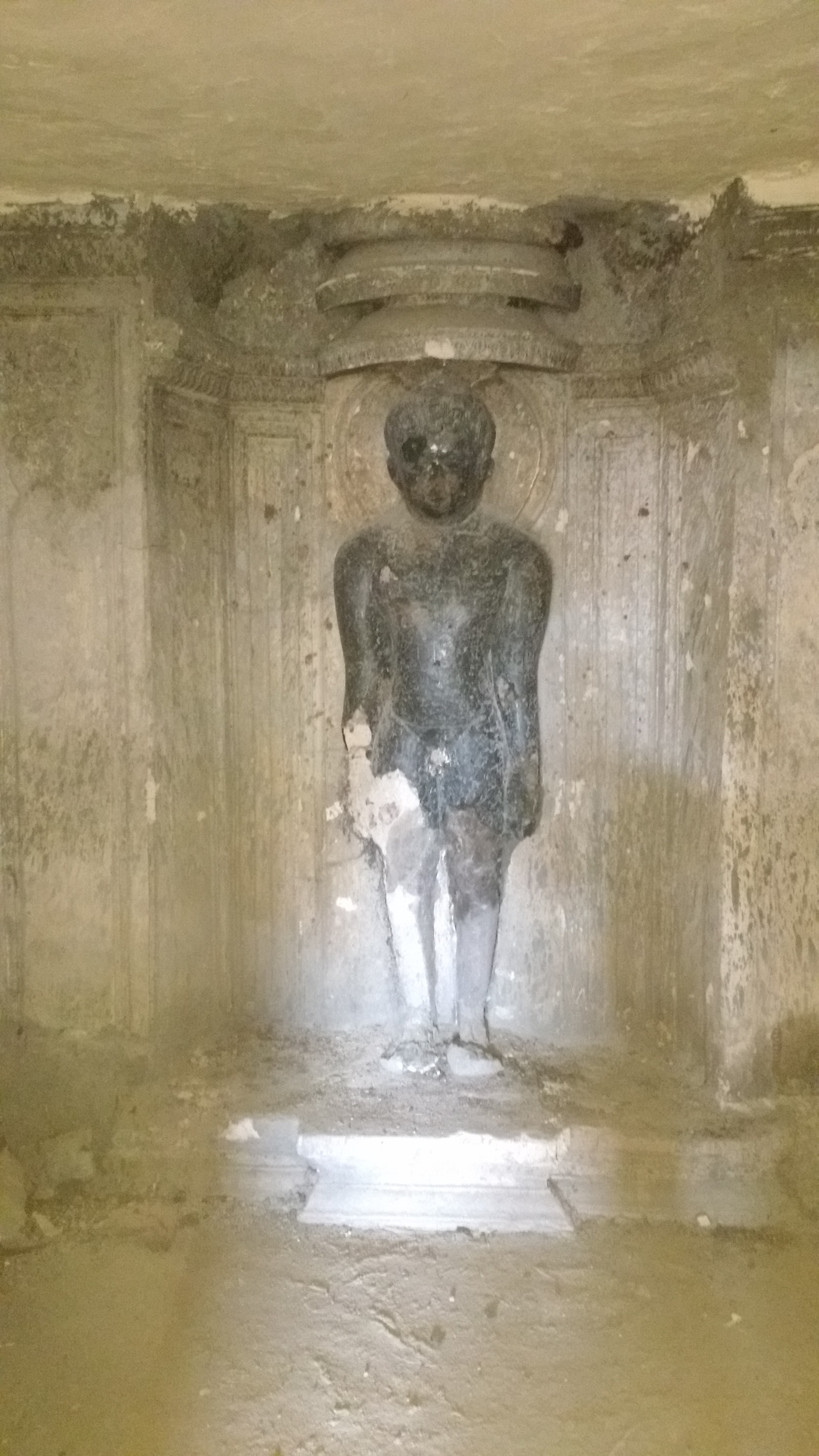
Lord Mahaveer at Dharashiv Caves

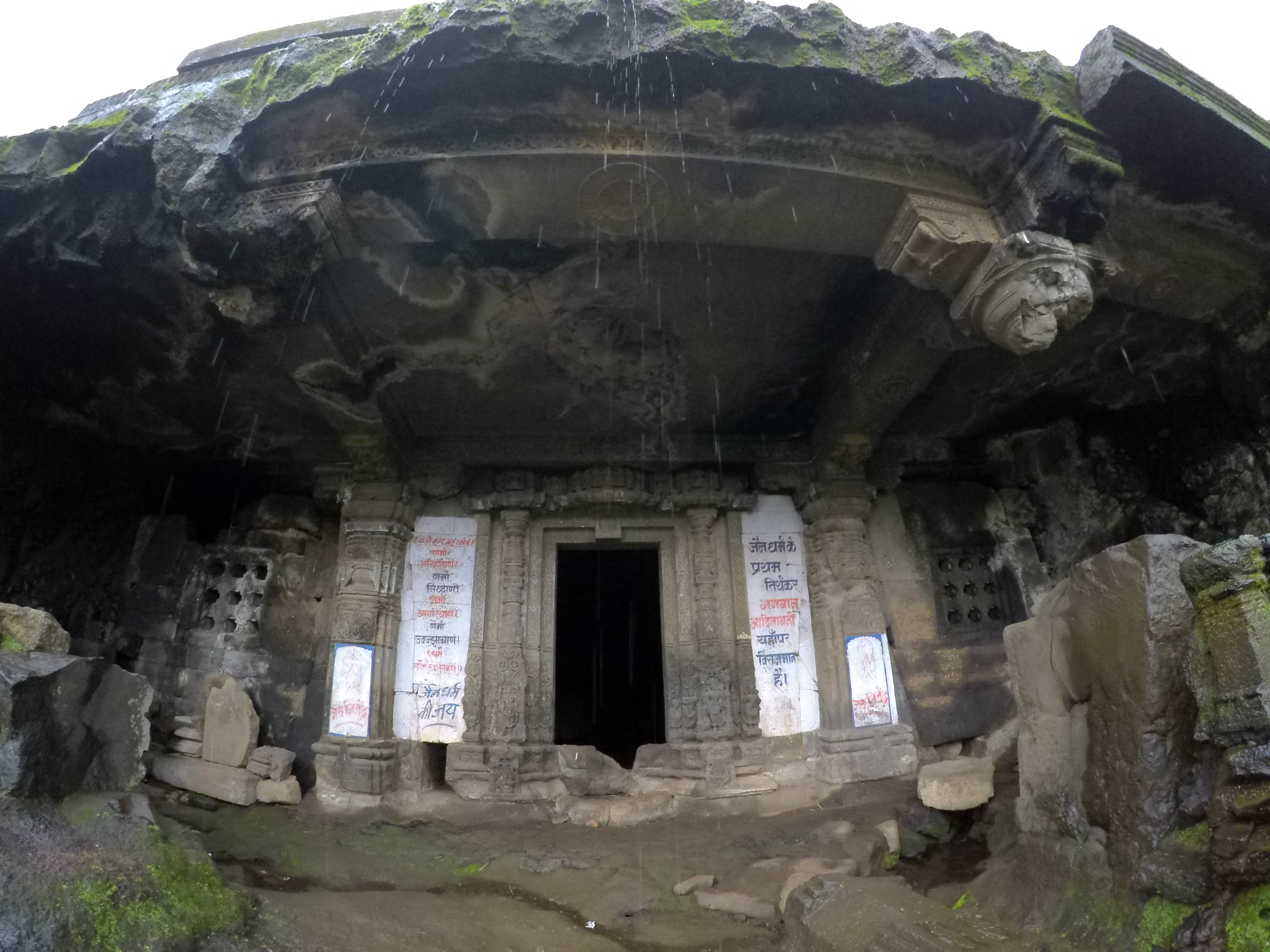
Tringalwadi Jain Cave

Shri Kalikund Parshwanatha Digambar Jain Kshetra

== Notable Marathi Jains ==
- V. Shantaram
- Walchand Hirachand
- Ajit Gulabchand
- Akshar Kothari
- Sandhya Shantaram
- Kiran Shantaram
- Karmaveer Bhaurao Patil
- Bal Patil
- Suresh Jain
- Raju Shetti
- Vidyadhar Johrapurkar
- Nirmalkumar Phadkule
- Vilas Adinath Sangave
- Dhulappa Bhaurao Navale
- Kallapa Awade
- Rajendra Patil
- Justice Bhalchandra Vagyani
- Dhananjay Gunde
- Annasaheb Latthe

== See also ==
- Jainism in Mumbai
- Acharya Shantisagar
- Acharya Vidyasagar
