= Aryanandi (born 1907) =

Jain monk who established schools in Maharashtra

Acharya Aryanandi
- Official name: Acharya Aryanandi

Personal life
- Born: Shankar; 28 February 1907 Dhorkin Also Known As Aryanandi nagar, Paithan, British India (now Aurangabad district, Maharashtra, India)
- Died: 8 February 2000 (aged 92) Navagad, Parbhani, Maharashtra
- Parent(s): Laxmanrao, Krishnabai Ahmindra

Religious life
- Religion: Jainism
- Sect: Digambara
- Initiation: Aryanandi; 13 November 1959; Kunthalgiri, Maharashtra by Muni Samantabhadra
- Website: aryanandiseva.com

Acharya Aryanandi was a prominent Jain monk of the early 20th century. He is best known for his work in establishing several Jain schools in the Indian state of Maharashtra. Several Jain monks before him have also been named Aryanandi.

== Biography ==
Acharya Aryanandi was born in the village of Dhorkin Also Known As Aryanandi Nagar, Paithan, Aurangabad district, Maharashtra, India. He has been the only Jain acharya from the Saitwal community in recent times. He was married in 1927 and had three children, however in 1953 he retired and decided to give up the worldly life. He was He took the brahmacharya vrata from Acharya Shantisagar in 1955. He was initiated as a muni by Muni Samanthabhadra at Kunthalgiri, Maharashtra, on 13 November 1959. He took sallekhana on 8 February 2000 at Navagad (Parbhani).

== Contributions ==
He was held in high esteem and is best remembered for the setting up of several Jain schools in Maharashtra, including the Acharya Arya Nandi Lecture Hall in Ellora, Aurangabad district, Maharashtra. The Jain Gurukul at Ellora was also established by him. The noted German Jainologist, Hermann Kuhn, studied Jain scriptures extensively under the tutelage of Acharya Aryanandi.

== See also ==
- Acharya Shantisagar
- Jainism in Maharashtra
