= Shantinath Jain Teerth =

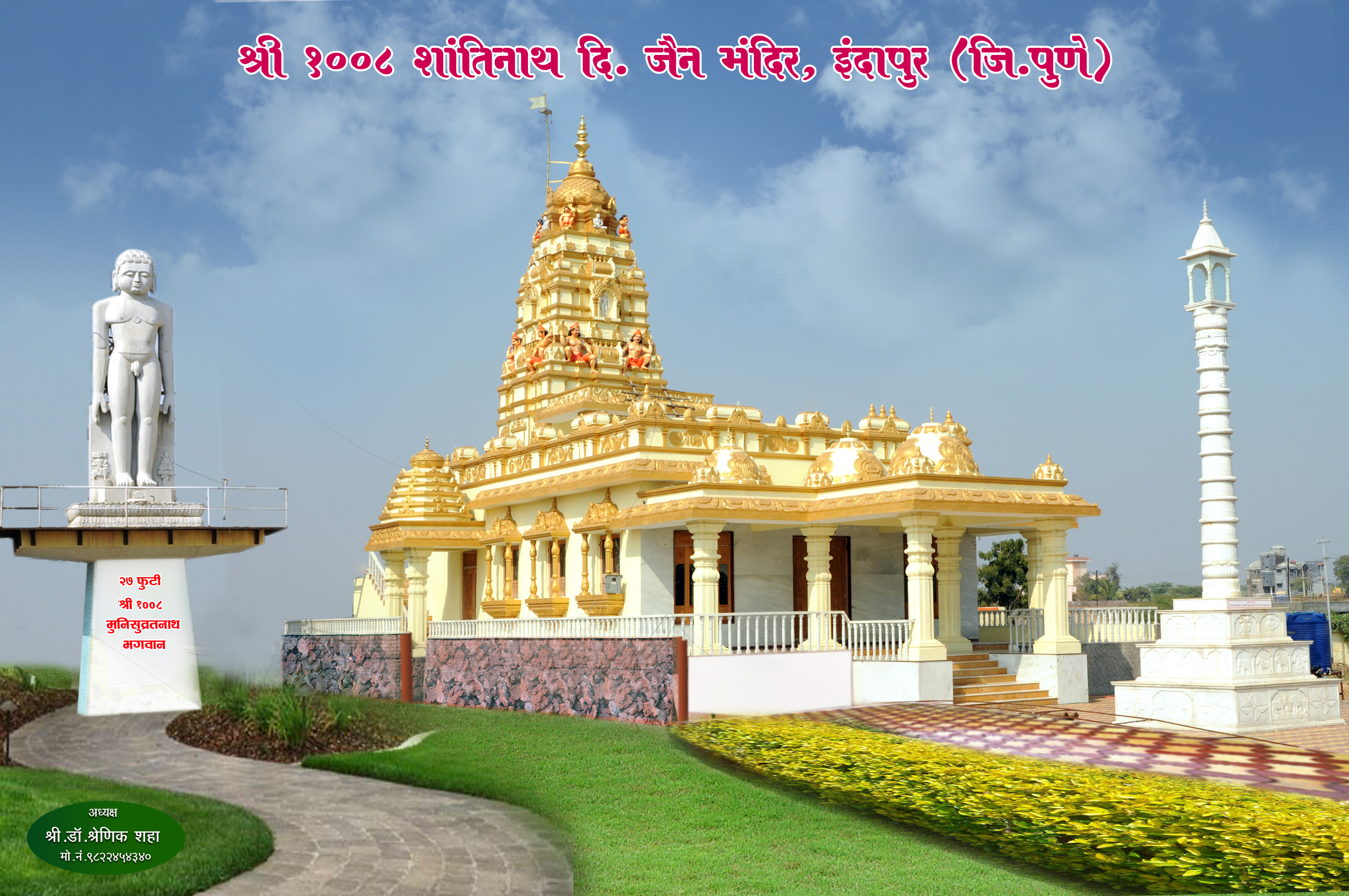
- Shri 1008 Shantinath Jain Teerth

- Location within Maharashtra

Religion
- Affiliation: Jainism
- Deity: Munisuvrata
- Festivals: Mahavir Jayanti, Mahamastakabhisheka
- Governing body: Trustees

Location
- Location: Indapur, Pune, Maharashtra, India
- Coordinates: 18°07′25.9″N 75°01′03.5″E

Architecture
- Creator: Dr. Shrenik Shaha & colleagues
- Established: 10 May 2011

Specifications
- Temple: 1
- Monument: 5

The Shantinath Jain Teerth, also known as Shri 1008 Shantinath Digambar Jain Mandir, is a Jain temple located in Indapur, Pune, Maharashtra. The design and architecture of the temple is patterned after that of South Indian temples. The temple is known for its 27-feet tall granite idol of Shri 1008 Munisuvrata, the twentieth Tirthankara. The number 1008 is significant in Jainism and is associated with the Tirthankaras. The temple is also locally known as The Golden Temple because of its golden facade.

== The Temple ==
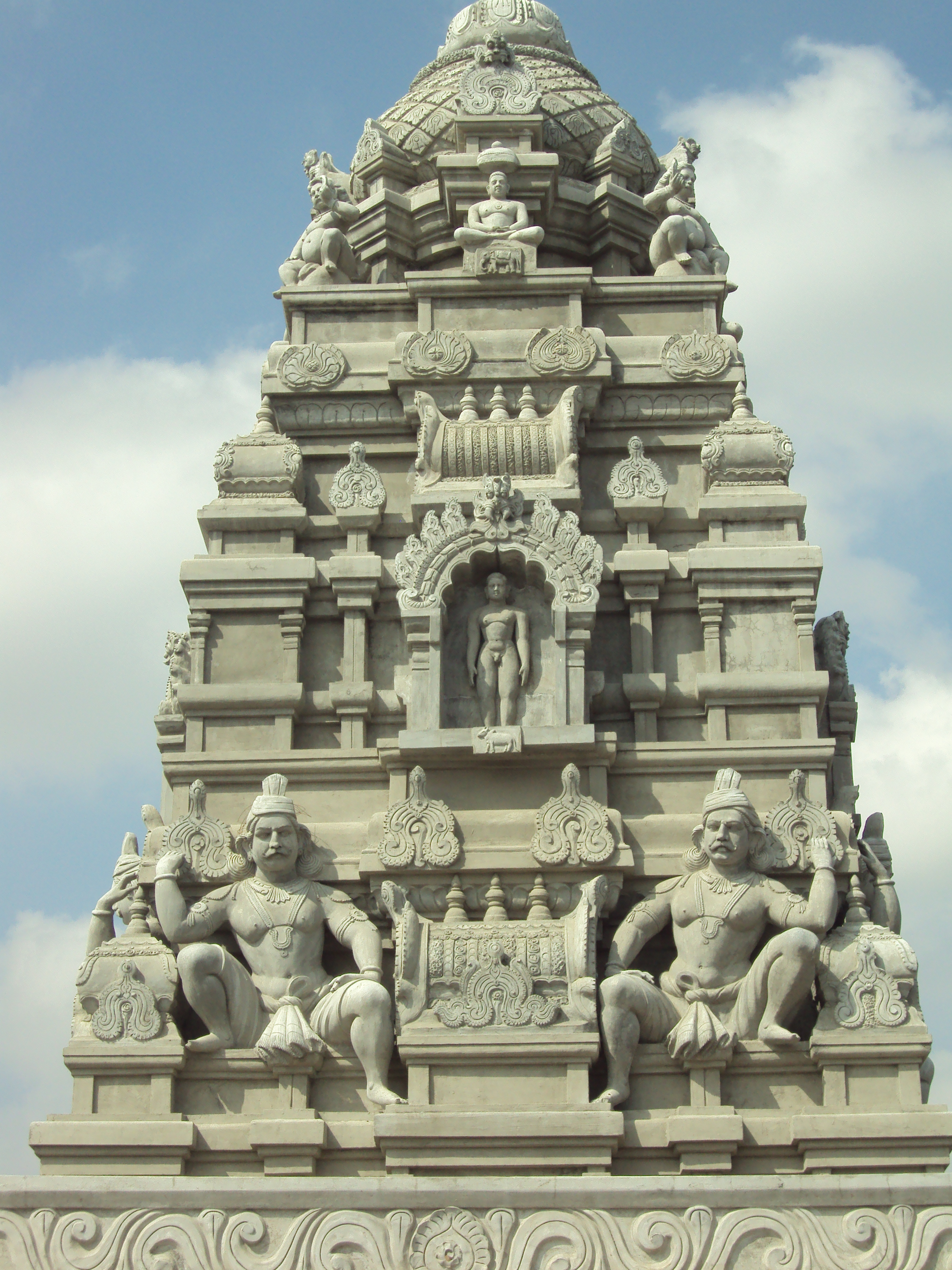
31 feet South Pattern Shikhar during construction

=== Architecture ===
The architecture draws inspiration from South Indian Jain places of worship. The temple has a 31 feet Shikhar, a high tower, modeled after the Shikhar of Mel Sithamur Jain Math. The structure is quadrangular in shape and constructed using reinforced concrete. The facade has been painted in gold by artisans from Mamallapuram. The tower houses an idol of Mahavira (24th Jain Tirthankara) made of brass.

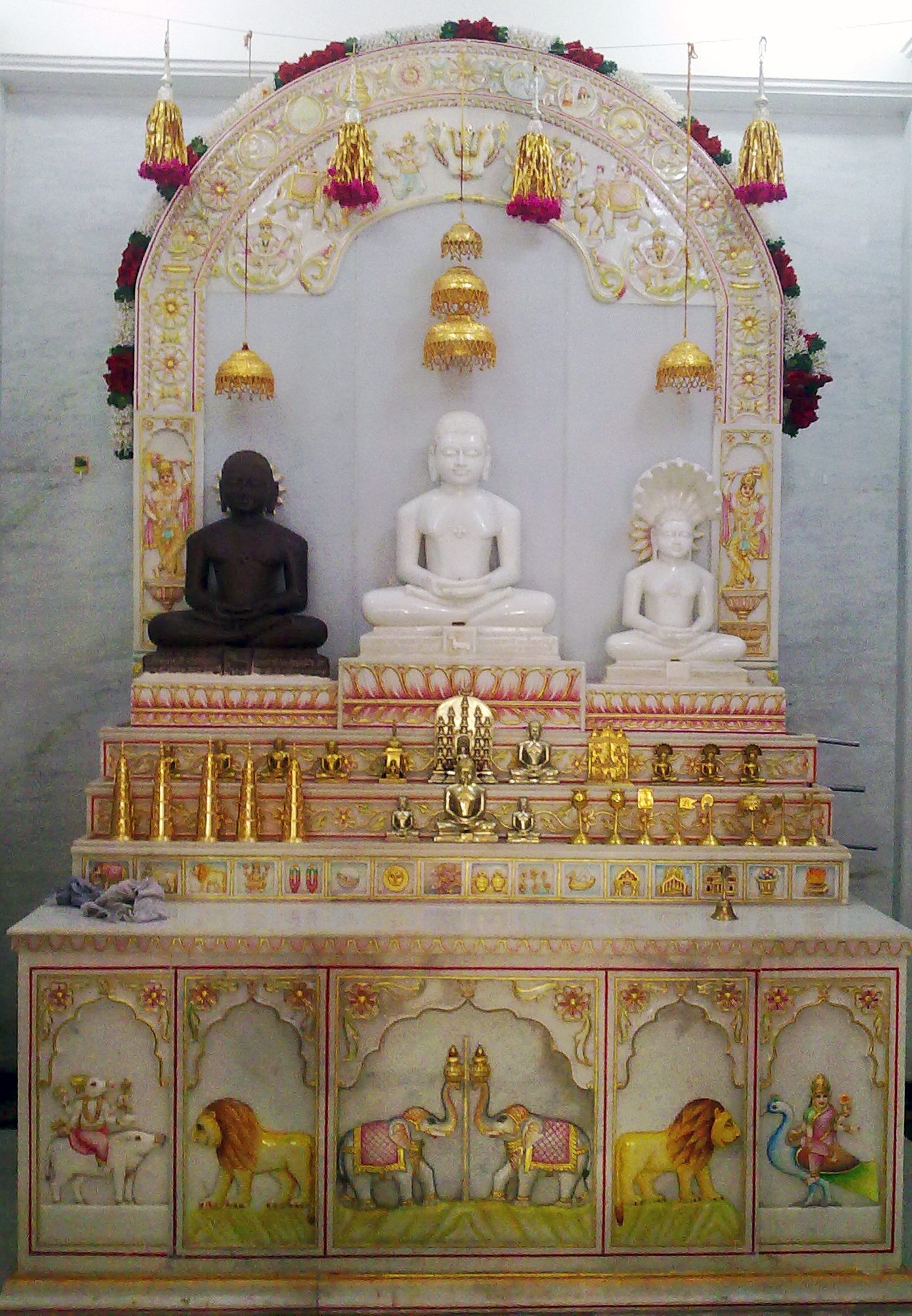
Parikar

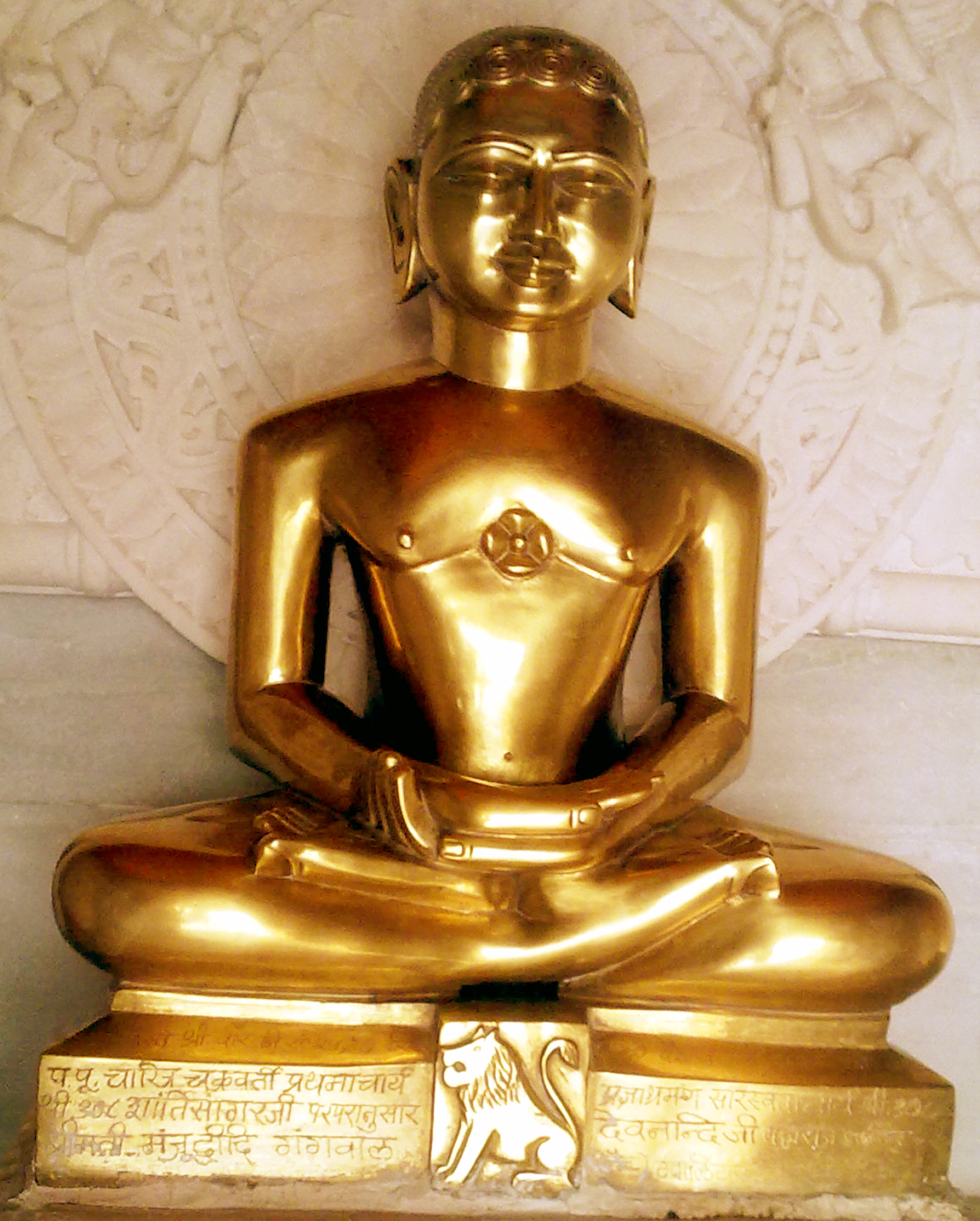
21 Inch Shri 1008 Mahaveer Bhagwan created in metal

=== Altar ===
Idols are placed on a Vedi, equivalent to Altar, in Jain temples. The main Vedi in Shantinath Jain Teerth has an arch with carvings of Jain gods on it and a rectangular base made of white marble. The idol of Shantinatha on the Vedi is flanked by a Yaksha and a Yakshini. The base has carvings of lions and elephants, Ashtamangala and Ashta Pratiharya (the eight symbols of the Tirthankara), and also depicts the sixteen auspicious dreams of Shantinatha's mother. The carvings are painted in a variety of colours.

Three more Vedis exist in the Shantinath Jain Teerth for other idols:

- Manibhadra Kshetrapal Maharaj: A Yaksha.
- Padmavati Devi : A Yakshini
- Saraswati Devi: The goddess of Knowledge.The idol holds the Jinvani, a sacred Jain text, in its hand. Additionally, the idol features a lotus and a peacock, symbols commonly associated with the goddess.

=== Jain idols ===
- Shantinatha made of white marble.
- Vasupujya made of red stone.
- Parshvanatha made of white marble.
- Mahavira made of brass and copper.
- Munisuvrata made of granite.

=== Column of Honour ===
The Manastambha or column of honour is 31 feet high and made of Albeta marble from Makrana. The column symbolizes humility in Jain philosophy. Its imposing presence is meant to vanquish the arrogance of devotees.

=== Munisuvrata ===
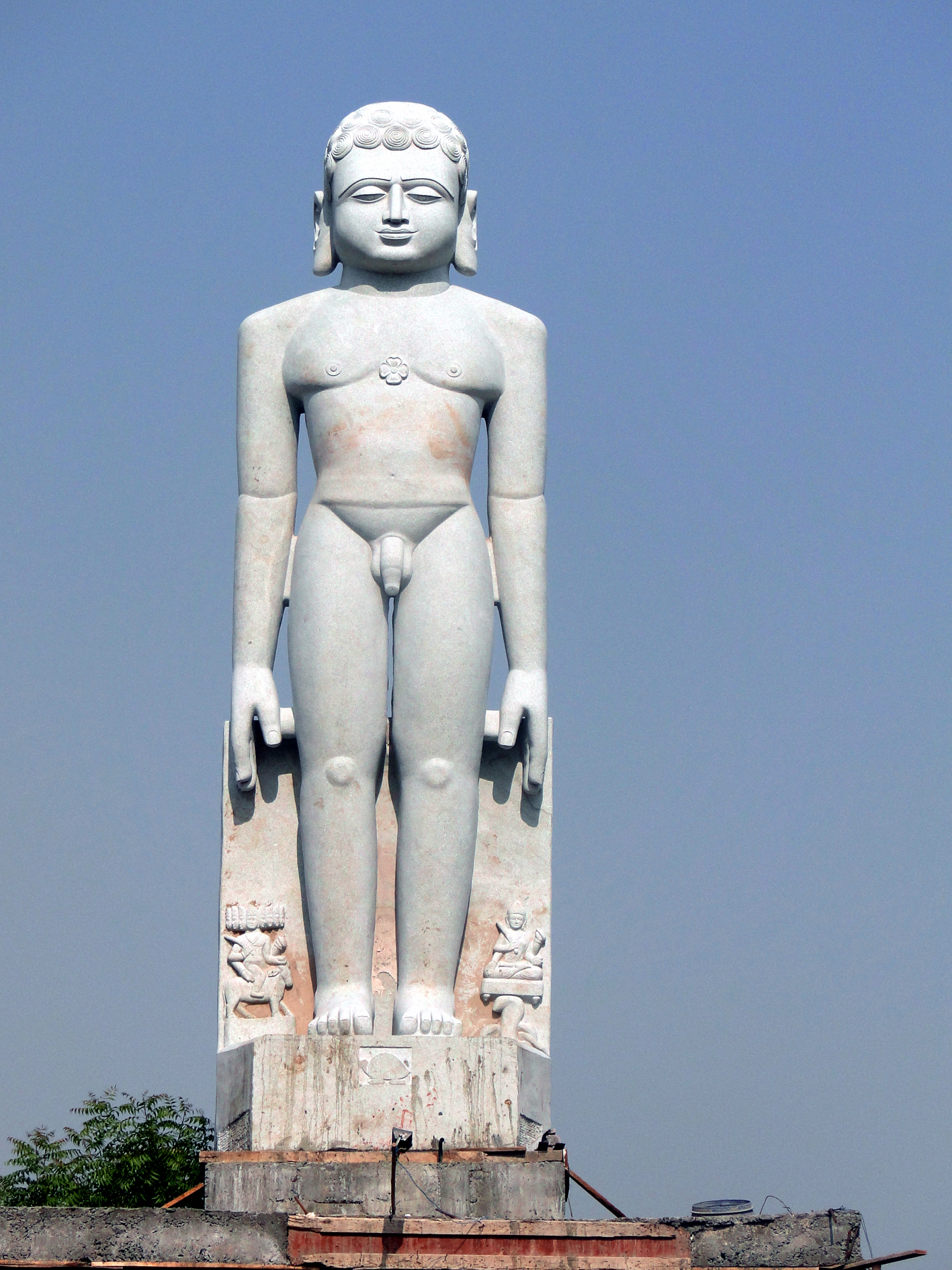
Shri 1008 Munisuvrata Bhagwan, a 27 feet statue

Munisuvrata was the 20th Tirthankara, regarded as the god of Shani Graha or the planet Saturn. The 27 feet tall idol of Munisuvrata in Shantinath Jain Teerth is made of granite stone as like in Shravanabelagola. It weighs 30 tons and is erected on a base 20 feet wide. It is the main attraction of the temple. The stone was brought from the outskirts of Bangalore and sculpted by artists from Jaipur. The sculpting was completed in two years. The Jain community in Indapur organizes an annual Rathotsava and Mahamastakabhisheka of the Munisuvrata idol. The next Mahamastakabhisheka is planned to be held in 2024.

== Location ==
Indapur city is in the Pune district in Maharashtra, India. It is 135 km from Pune, 110 km from Solapur, 60 km from Pandharpur, 300 km from Mumbai, and 1400 km from Delhi.

== Transport ==
- Road: National Highway 9 Pune to Solapur.
- Railway: Nearest railway stations are Daund 60 km, Kurduvadi 90 km, Pune 135 km .
- Airport: Nearest airports are Pune 135 km, Mumbai 300 km.

== Religious organizations ==
The Dakshin Bharat Jain Sabha is a religious and social service organization of the Jains of South India. The organization is headquartered at Kolhapur, Maharashtra, India. The association is credited with being one of the first Jain associations to start reform movements among the Jains in modern India. The organization mainly seeks to represent the interests of the native Jains of Maharashtra (Marathi Jains), Karnataka (Kannada Jains) and Goa.

== Photo gallery ==
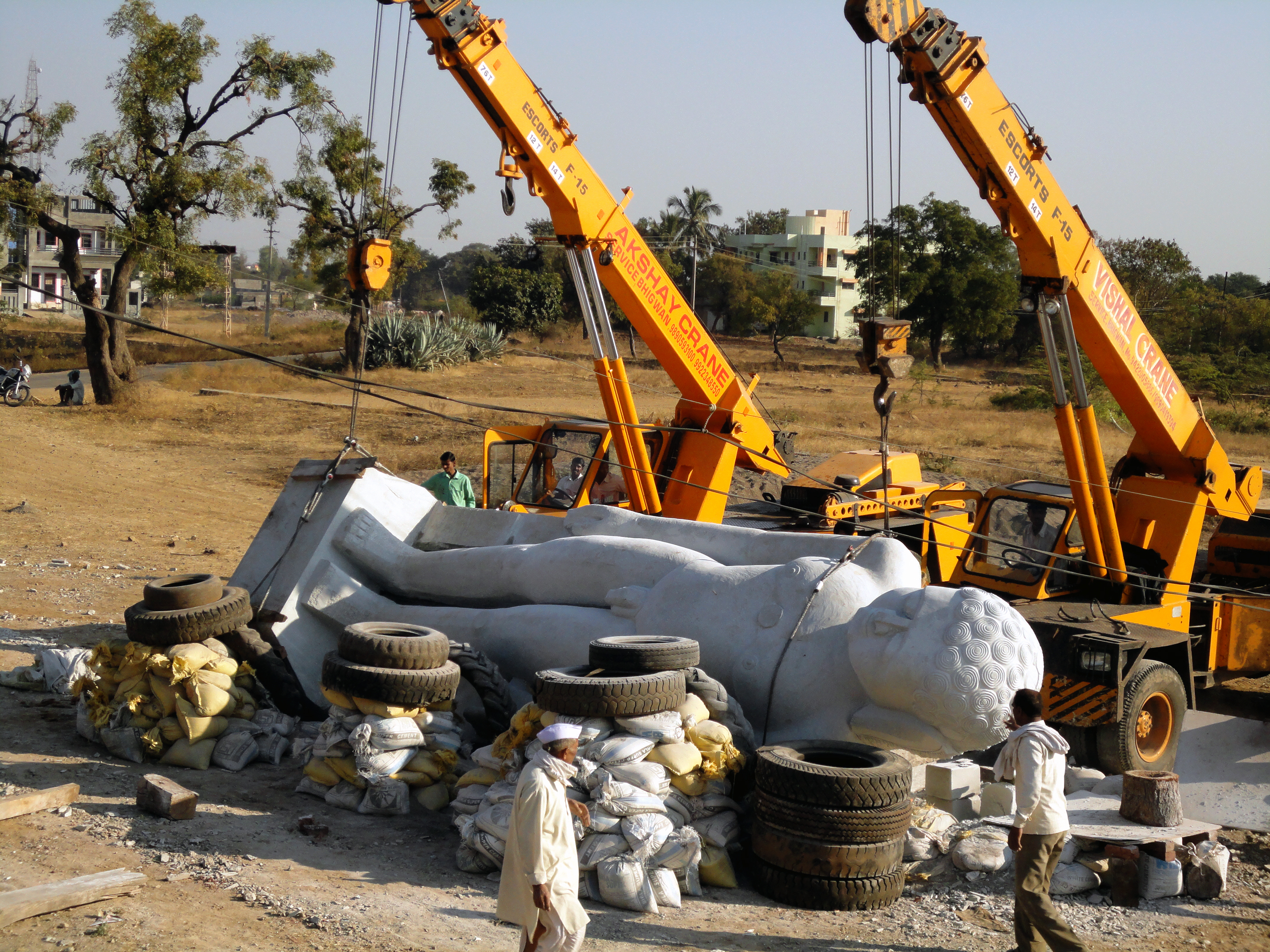
Idol being lifted by cranes

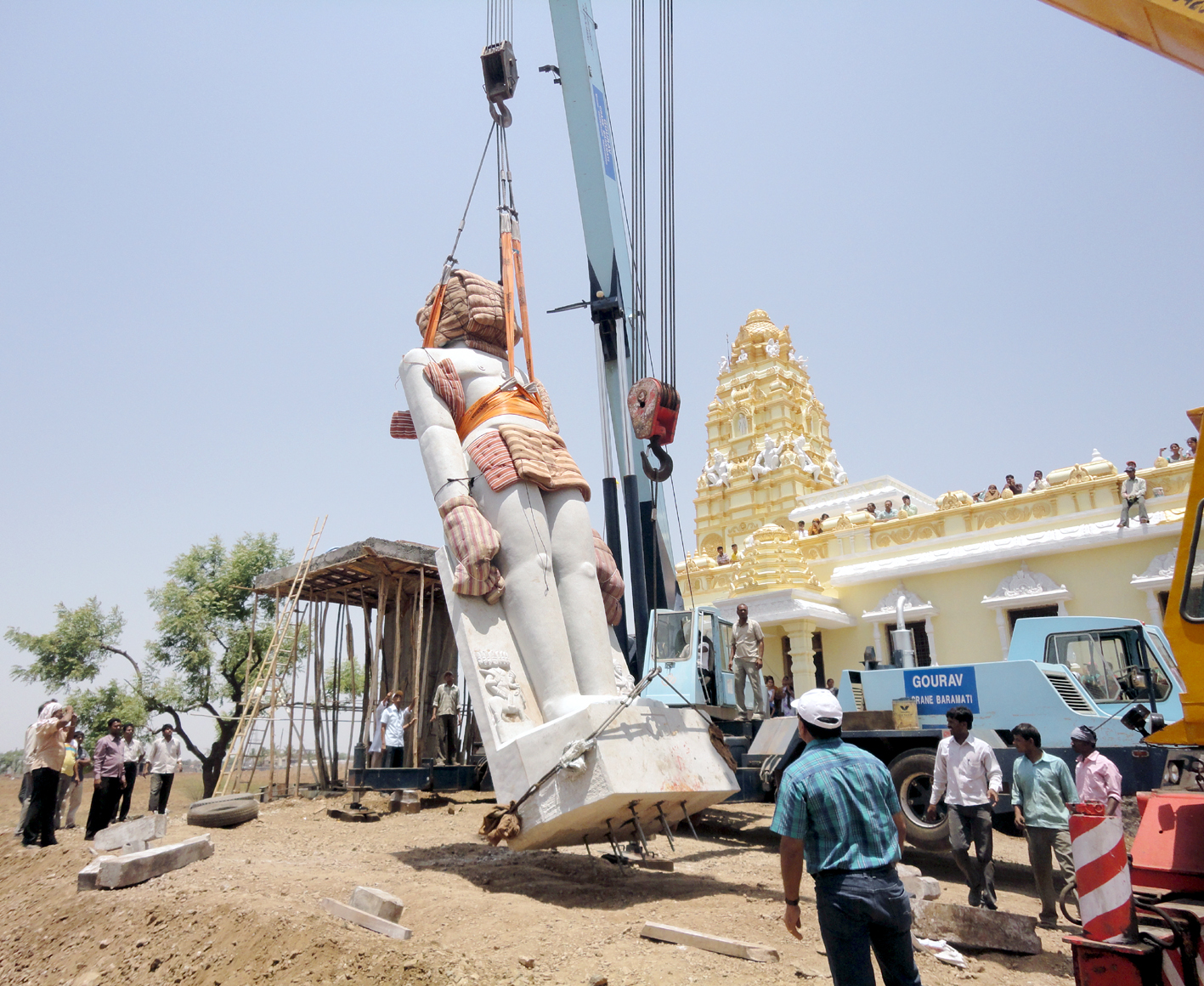
The lifting of the Idol

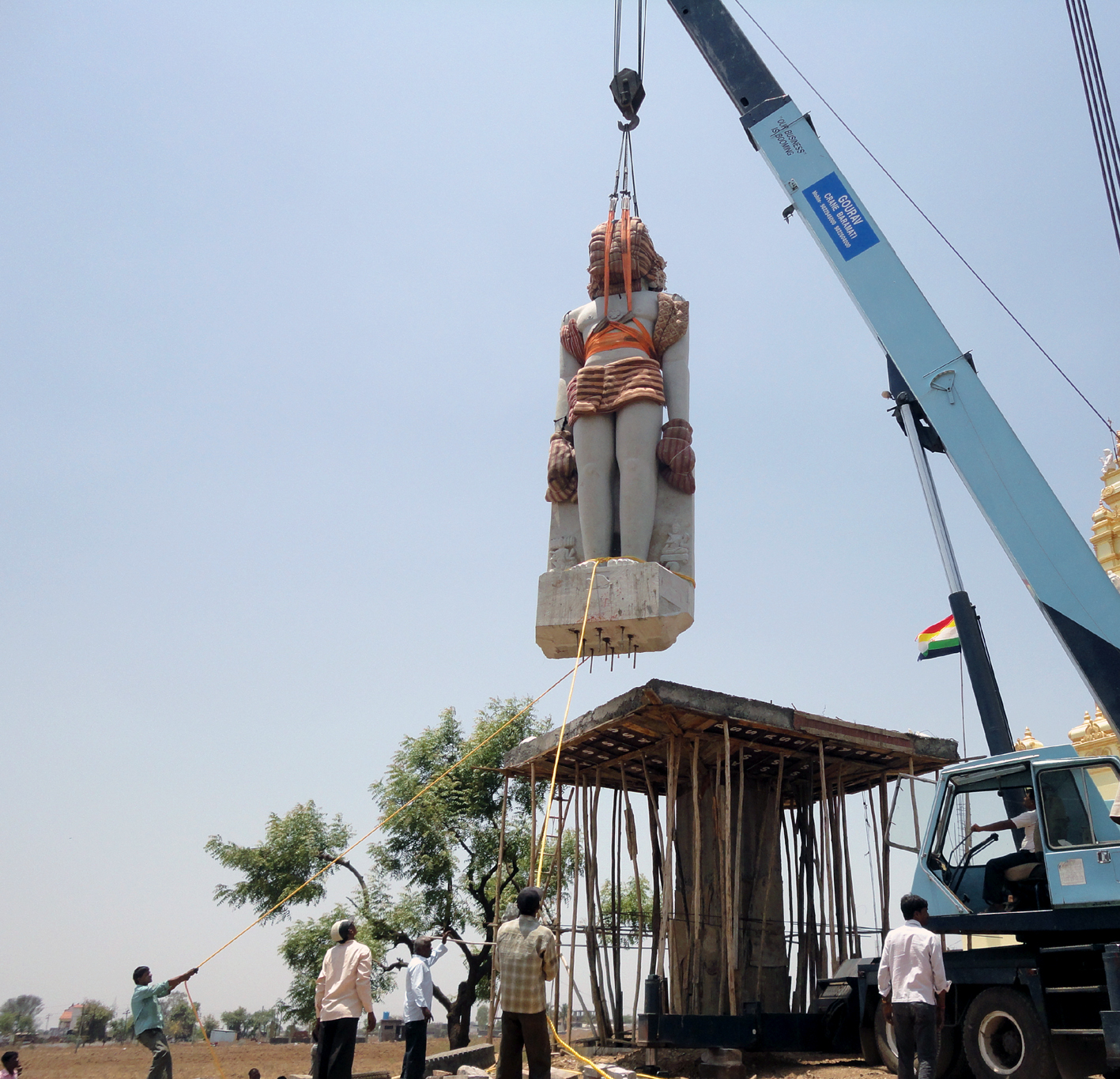
Idol being moved into position

== Mahamastakabhishek 2012 ==
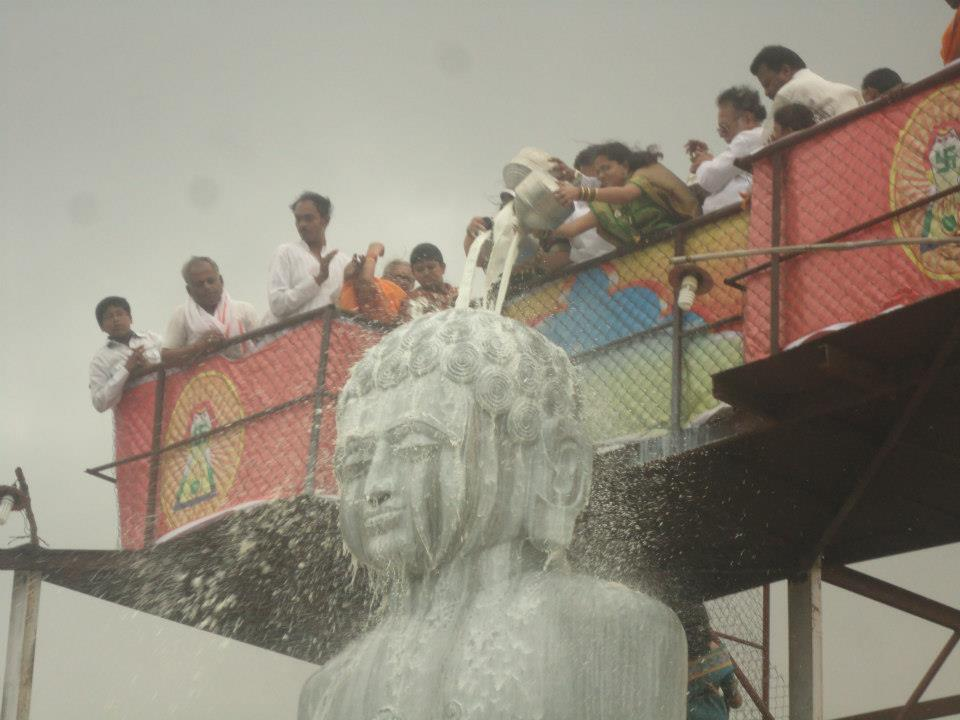
Mahamastakabhishek by Milk

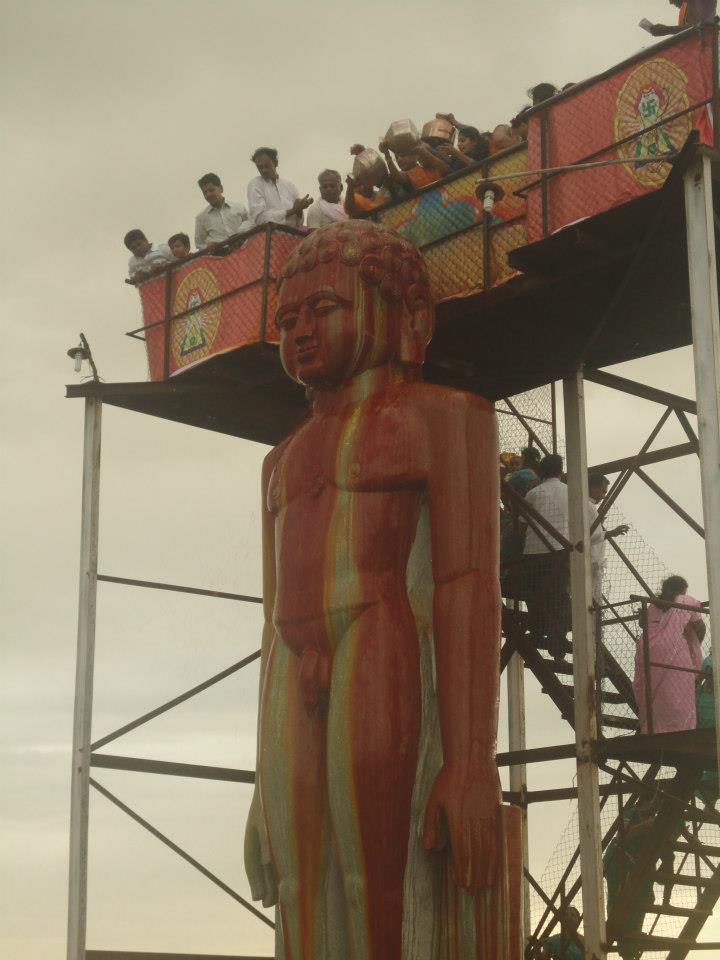
Mahamastakabhishek by Kumkum

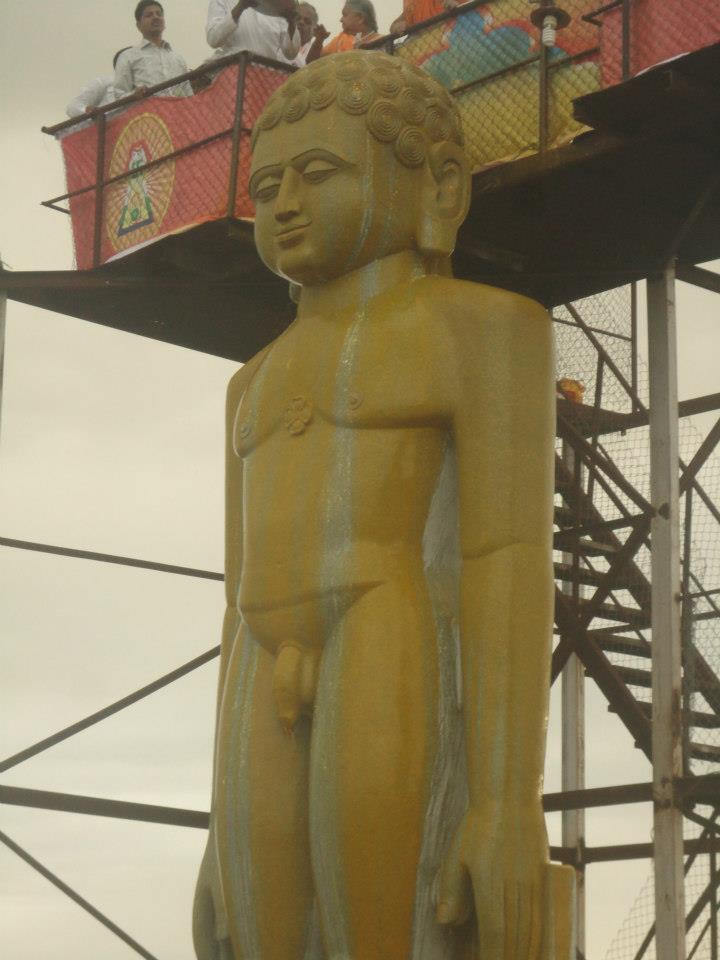
Mahamastakabhishek by Haldi

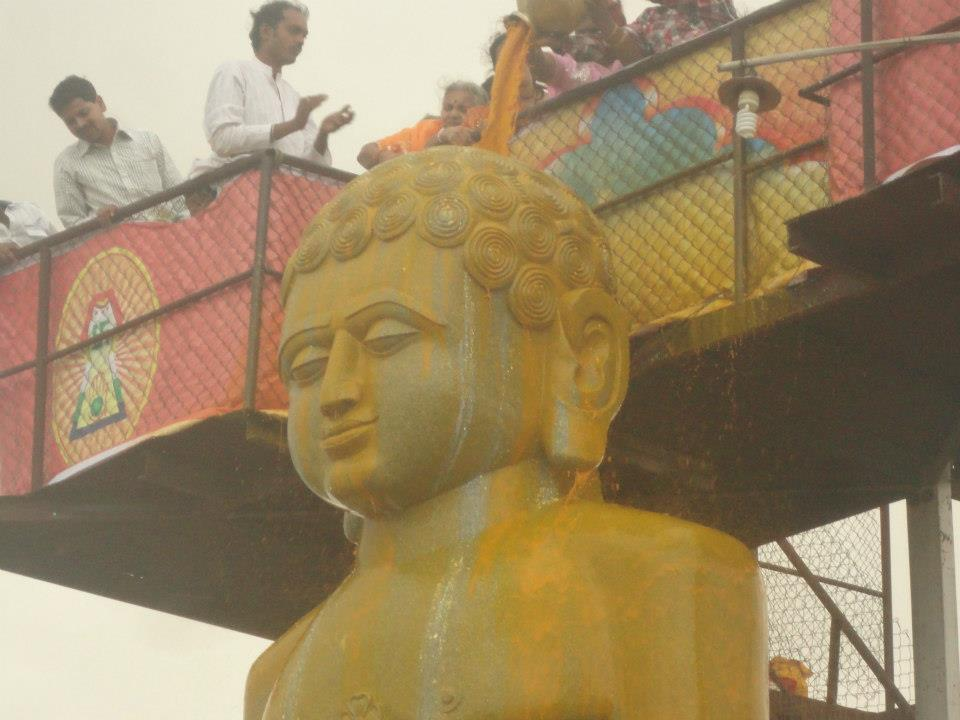
Mahamastakabhishek by Haldi

== See also ==
- Jainism in Maharashtra
- Ujjani Dam
- Tuljapur
- Akkalkot
- Pandharpur
