= Kumbhoj =

Town in Kolhapur district

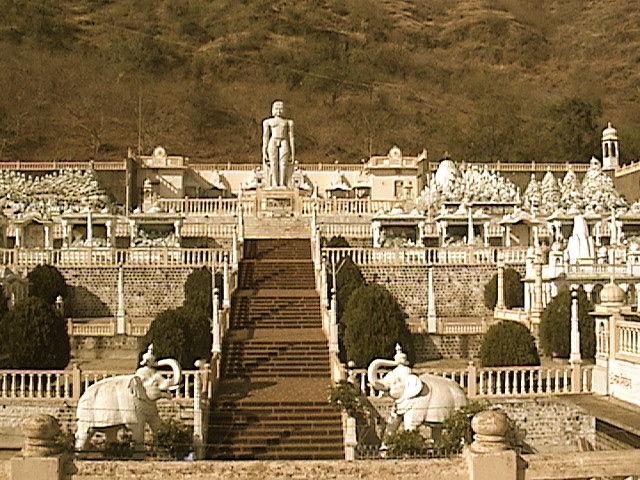
- 28 feet Bahubali statue, Kumbhoj

- Location within Maharashtra

Religion
- Affiliation: Secular
- Festivals: Mahavir Jayanti, Dasara, Diwali,
- Governing body: Grampanchayat, Kumbhoj

Location
- Coordinates: 16°49′17.9″N 74°26′41.5″E

Architecture
- Established: 1156 AD
- Temple: 14

Kumbhoj (pronounced as kum'bho'j) is the name of an ancient town located in Kolhapur district in Maharashtra. The town is about eight kilometers from Hatkanangale, about twenty seven kilometers from Kolhapur and currently, also is the Taluka or Tehsil Headquarters. The famous Jain Tirtha (pilgrim place) known as Bahubali, is just two kilometers away from the Kumbhoj city.

As the name itself suggests, Kumbhoj seems to be connected with well-known ancient term Kamboja of Sanskrit/Pali literature.

Alternative name of Kumbhoj is Kumboj (Kamboj). The former name is apparently free from Iranian or Paisaci influence since Maharashtra location was far removed from the north-west division of ancient India. Kamboj is the standard name found in numerous ancient Sanskrit and Pali texts.

Padma Vibhushan Dr. Karmaveer Bhaurao Patil, a renowned social worker and philanthropist was born at Kumbhoj.

Bahubali at Kumbhoj is identical to the Bahubali of Shravanabelagola known as Gomateshwar to the south in Karnataka.

== History ==
During the second century BCE, a section of Kambojas from Central India had joined the great tribal movement to Central Asia. One section of those Kambojas appears to have given their name to this coastal town of southwest India. There is said to be a microscopic Jain community, predominantly agrarian, called Kambhoj living near Nanded in Maharashtra.

Kumbhoj was very ancient village where Devi Shakambari has visited. There is a temple of Devi Shakambari which has close relation from Banashankari near Badami. This village was mainly ruled by Brahmins whose surname was "Kulkarni" (now they are migrated from this village and changed their names to "Kumbhojkar") who were integral part of Chatrapati Shahu Maharaj' team for consulting them and providing suggestions over critical and political issues.

There is a reference to sage Kumbhoja (q.v.) who finds reference in southern Indian recensions of Ramayana. He seems to have lived somewhere on the banks of river Godavari, in southwest India during Ramayana times. Seems like sage Kambhoja originally belonged to northwest and had migrated to south of Vindhya on river Godawri.

The Shakambari Madir needs cultivation through Archaeological Survey of India.

Kumbhoj is nowadays famous for the agriculture land where sugar cane farming is popular.

== Jain Temple ==
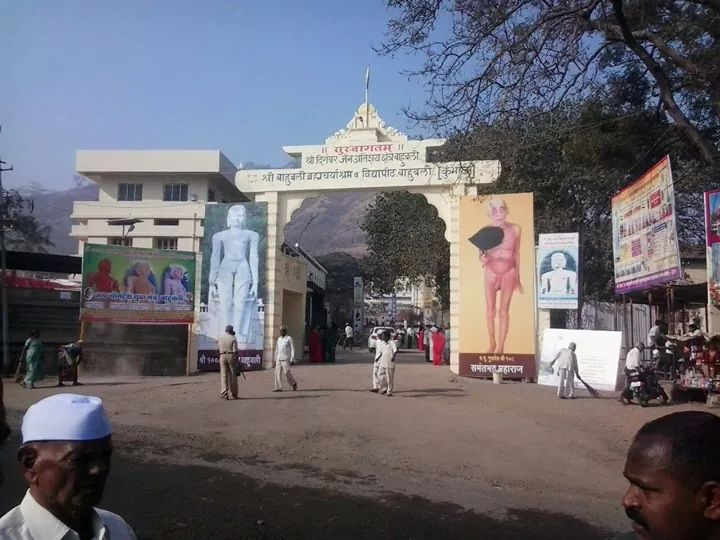
Main Entrance of the Temple

In 1156 AD, a 6 feet tall idol of lord Bahubali was installed here. Many Jain saints have visited this place including Shri Bahubali Maharaj, Shri Prabhachandraji, Shri Kamlakarji, Shri 108 Shanti Sagarji. The temple also has a dharamshala equipped with all modern facilities This Tirth has small scale replicas of Gajpantha, Taranga, Mangi-Tungi, Sonagiri and Pavagiri on left and Kailash Parvat, Shikharji and Girnarji on right side. Jal Mandir, Ratnatraya temple, Shantinath Temple, Chandaprabhu Temple, Adinath Temple and Samavsharan Mandir are also built near main temple.

=== Bahubali monolith ===
A monolithic statue of Bahubali in kayotsarga posture was installed in 1963. The statue is situated on about 50 steps up and 8.5 m (28 feet) in high at Kumbhoj, Kolhapur, Maharashtra. The famous Jain Tirtha (pilgrim place) known as Bahubali, is just two kilometers away from the Kumbhoj village. Bahubali at Kumbhoj is identical to the Bahubali of Shravanabelagola known as Gomateshwar to the south in Karnataka

=== Mahamastakabhishek ===
Mahamastakabhisheka (Maha-mastak-abhishek = Grand religious ablution from head) happens in every 12 years. This pious event runs for continuous 7 days with witnessing thousands of pilgrims across the country.

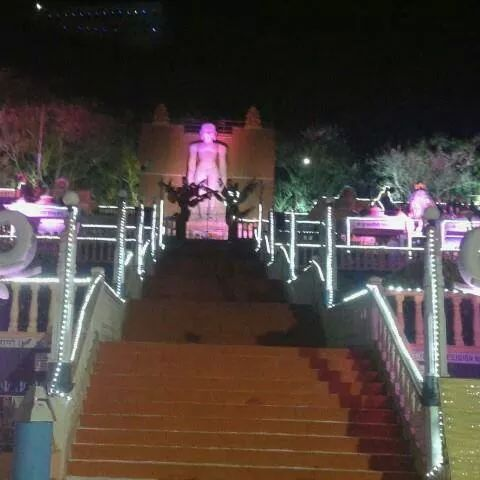
Bahubali Statue during Mahamastakabhishek

== Transportation ==
Sangli railway station is 27 km from Kumbhoj. Passengers coming to Kumbhoj prefer to get down at Sangli station and take darshan at various Jain temples in Sangli and then proceed to Kumbhoj for worship. Sangli to Kumbhoj is only 30 minutes travel. Rikshas, Cars and buses are available from Sangli to Kumbhoj.

Sangli railway station is connected to major cities like Mumbai, Pune, Delhi, Surat, Baroda, Ahmedabad, Delhi, Goa, Bangalore, Agra, Bhopal, Mysore, Hubli, Cochin, Mangalore, Gandhidham, Pondicherry, Nagpur, etc. by express trains.

Miraj railway junction is one of the busiest in western India with four railway lines connecting it. Miraj is connected to all major Indian cities by express and superfast trains which include Karnataka Sampark Kranti (KSK) express, Chandigarh Sampark Kranti express, Goa express, Mumbai Hubli express, Yeswantpur Miraj express, Pondhichery express, Tirunelveli express, Suvarnajayanti express, Chalukya express, Shravati express, Bangalore Jodhpur express, Bangalore Ajmer express, Bangalore Gandhidham express, Mahalaxmi express, Sahyadri express, Koyna express, Rani Chenamma express, Haripriya express, Miraj Hubli express, Kolhapur Hyderabad express, Kolhapur Solapur express, Maharashtra express, Deekshabhoomi express and many other passenger trains.

Miraj railway junction is 27 km from Kumbhoj. There are private cars from Miraj station that reach Kumbhoj in 30 minutes.

Hatkanangale station is 4 km from Kumbhoj. Few trains going towards Kolhapur stop at Hatkanangale. For trains running on the Pune-Miraj-Hubli mainline, one can travel from Miraj junction. Vegetarian Jain food is served at Miraj junction by Miraj Jain Temple for people travelling via Miraj junction.

From Mumbai or Bangalore you can reach by bus also and from Kolhapur to Kumbhoj from Kolhapur and Sangli you can reach this place by buses running Maharatra State Road transport (called as ST-Bus) or by car.

== Religious organizations ==
The Dakshin Bharat Jain Sabha is a religious and social service organization of the Jains of South India. The organization is headquartered at Kolhapur, Maharashtra, India. The association is credited with being one of the first Jain associations to start reform movements among the Jains in modern India. The organization mainly seeks to represent the interests of the native Jains of Maharashtra, Karnataka and Goa.

== See also ==
- Jainism in Maharashtra
- Jainism in Mumbai
- Jainism in North Karnataka
- Jainism in Karnataka
- Acharya Shantisagar
- Acharya Vidyasagar
