= Modern College =

Modern College may refer to:

- Modern College (Mauritius)
- Karmaveer Bhaurao Patil College (formerly Modern College) in Mumbai
- Modern College (Hong Kong) provided instruction of day school education at Secondary 5, Form 6 and 7 levels in a full-day, standard schooling format on subjects under the formal curriculum set forth by the HKEDB.
