= Digambar Tukaram Shirke =

Indian academic

Digambar Tukaram Shirke is an Indian professor who served as Vice Chancellor of University of Mumbai, Shivaji University, and Karmaveer Bhaurao Patil College.
