= Bhaurao Patil =

Social activist and educator in Maharashtra, India

Karmaveer Bhaurao Patil
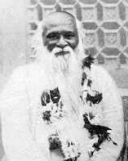
- Patil in 1949
- Born: 22 September 1887; Kumbhoj, Kolhapur State, British India (now in Maharashtra, India)
- Died: 9 May 1959 (aged 71)
- Occupations: Educationalist, social activist
- Organization: Rayat Education Society
- Known for: Spreading education in the rural areas of Maharashtra
- Awards: Padma Bhushan (1959)

Bhaurao Patil (22 September 1887 – 9 May 1959), was a social activist and educator in Maharashtra, India. A strong advocate of mass education, he founded the Rayat Education Society. Bhaurao played an important role in educating backward castes and low income people by coining the philosophy earn and learn. He was a prominent member of Satyashodhak Samaj, founded by Mahatma Jyotirao Phule. The people of Maharashtra honoured him with the sobriquet Karmaveer (King of actions) and the Government of India awarded him with Padma Bhushan in 1959 in India.

== Early life ==
Karmaveer Bhaurao Patil was born in a Marathi Jain farming family at Kumbhoj in Kolhapur district. Bhaurao's father was a clerk in the revenue department for East India company. Bhaurao was one of the first few Jains known to have passed 8th class of secondary school. During childhood, Bhaurao was heavily influenced by Chhatrapati Shahu, the ruler of Kolhapur State, who provided a facility to Bhaurao to stay in the palace of Kolhapur with Maharaj and study. Shahu was promoter of social equality and education of people belonging to backward castes. Eventually, his father sent him to Kolhapur for further education, where he got in contact with Satya Shodhak Movement and found other sources of inspiration, including Mahatma Phule and Maharshi Vitthal Ramji Shinde.

== Social Work ==
Bhaurao garnered political interest and decided to express his role in the fight for Indian freedom struggle by working in other beneficial fields like public education. While he worked for companies such as Ogale glassworks, Kirloskars and Coopers, he participated in the activities of Satya Shodhak Samaj. He had realized by then that the only remedy for the social evils of those times was the education of the masses. In 1919, he started a hostel where children from so called lower castes and poor families could stay and get an education while working to pay the expenses. This was the foundation of what later became Rayat Shikshan Sansthan.

As Bhaurao started working on his program to educate the masses, Gandhiji had also launched his campaign to free India (independence movement). During a public meeting in 1921, Bhaurao happened to come across Gandhiji at Mumbai. He was highly impressed by Gandhi's appearance in a loincloth and his philosophy of Khadi. Following this encounter, Bhaurao decided to adopt Khadi attire and follow Gandhian principles in everyday living. Eventually, he vowed to see it to completion, establishing 101 schools in Gandhi's name. However, Gandhiji and Bhaurao had a difference of opinion on the subject of accepting grants from the government for educational activities in post-independence India. Gandhiji believed that even if the government wanted to give grants in aid to an educational institute (or institutes) without putting any restrictions on the institutes, this would eventually devolve into edicts and oversight. No one can expect to receive money without conditions forever. Bhaurao saw no such problem with accepting grants from the government. The Bountiful Banyan Tree is Patil's biography, written by Pandurang Ganapati Patil.

== Rayat Education Society ==
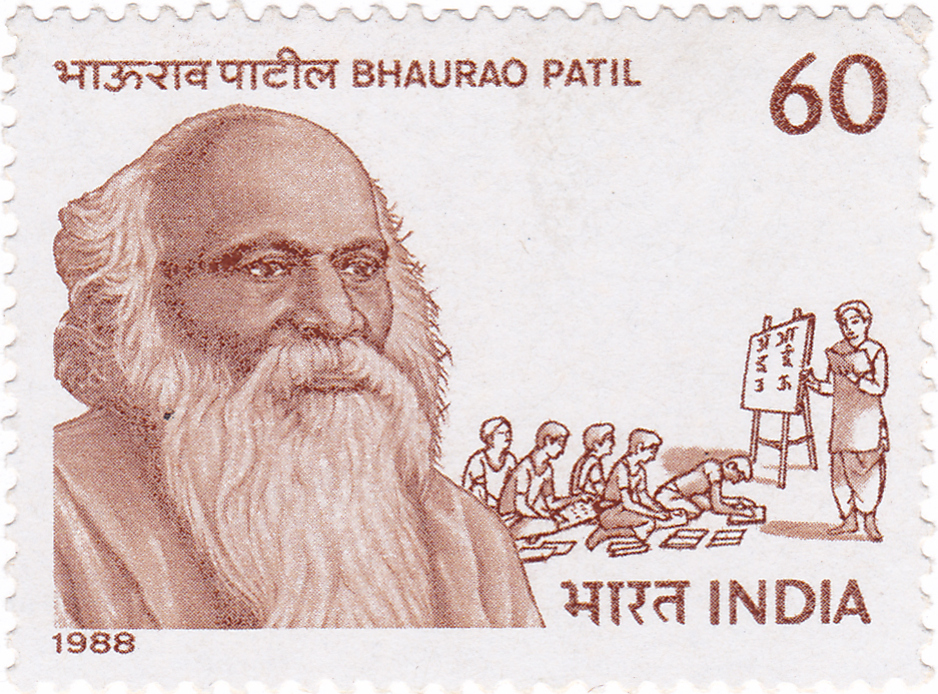
Bhaurao Patil 1988 stamp of India

While employed in the Kirloskar factory at Kolhapur, Bhaurao began working for the Satyashodhak Samaj. In a meeting of Satyashodhak Samaj, held at Kale near Karad, a resolution passed that in order to run the Satyashodhak movement successfully it would be necessary to educate the Bahujan Samaj. Accordingly, Bhaurao Patil established Rayat Shikshan Sanstha at a small village named Kale, on 4 October 1919. This society focused on the children of the masses, so it was named Rayat, the Marathi word for "masses". During Bhaurao's lifetime the Sanstha created thirty-eight cosmopolitan boarding schools, 578 voluntary schools, six training colleges, 108 secondary schools and three colleges.

== Biography on Padmabhushan Dr. Karamveer Bhaurao Patil ==
The Biography of Padmabhushan Dr. Karamveer Bhaurao Patil, which was available in Marathi, has been translated into English by D.T. Bhosale, bearing the title "Karmveer Bhaurao Patil" in 2016.

== Awards ==
- People of Maharashtra bestowed him with the title, "Karmveer" (Marathi for "King of actions").
- The Government of India awarded him with Padma Bhushan in 1959.
- The University of Pune awarded him an honorary D.Litt in education in 1959.
- The Karmveer Bhaurao Patil Samaj Seva Puraskar awards were named for him by the Dakshin Bharat Jain Sabha. They recognize people doing notable work for the cause of education and work towards community service.
- People also called him Anna (big brother).
- Karmaveer Bhaurao Patil State University founded in 2021
