= Shantinatha temple, Ramtek =

Jain temple in the state of Maharashtra

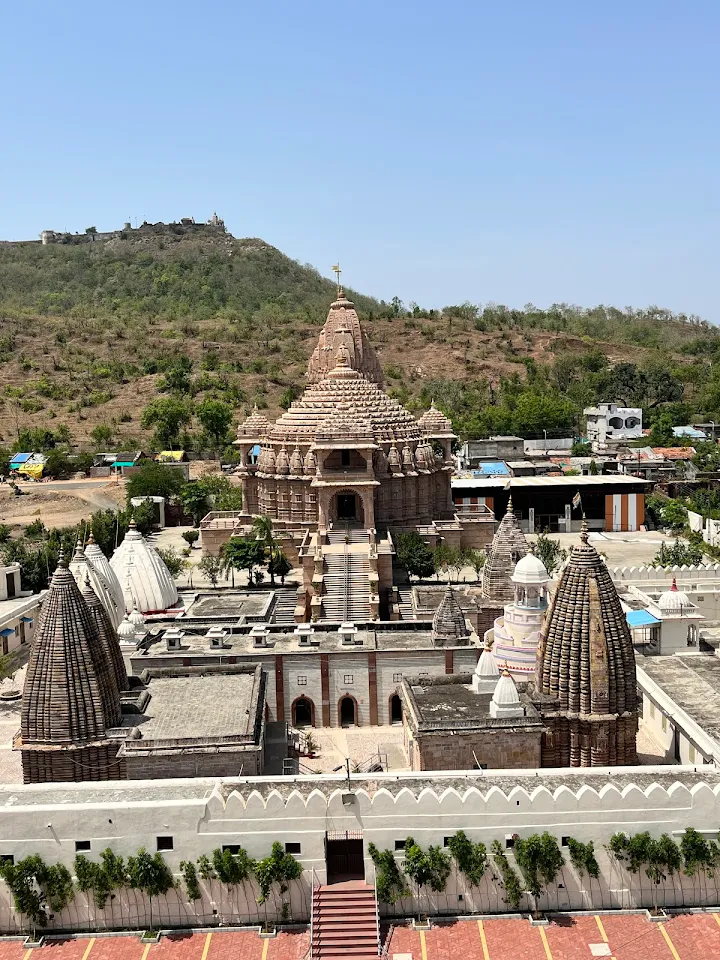
- Temple complex

- Location within Maharashtra

Religion
- Affiliation: Jainism
- Sect: Digambara
- District: Nagpur
- Deity: Shantinatha
- Festival: Mahavir Jayanti
- Governing body: Digambar Jain Parwar Mandir Trust

Location
- Location: Ramtek, Maharashtra
- State: Maharastra
- Coordinates: 21°24′20″N 79°19′47.4″E

Architecture
- Established: 11th century
- Temple: 10

Shantinatha temple, Ramtek is a major Jain tirth (pilgrimage site) in the Indian state of Maharashtra, located between the villages of Ramtek in Nagpur district.

== About temple ==
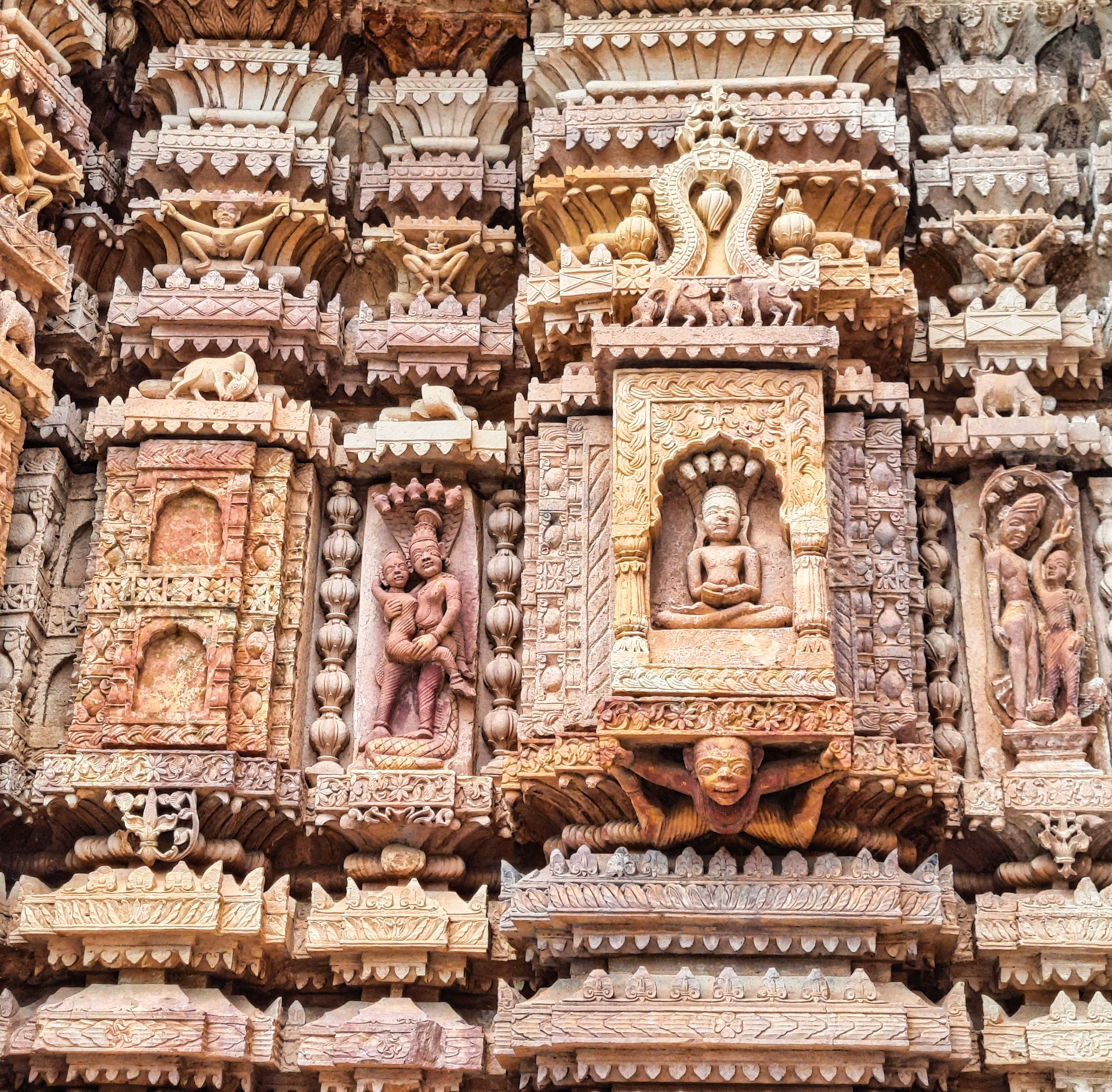
Intricate carvings on the temple wall

Shantinatha temple is situated near the Fort and Rama temple. The temple was constructed in the 11th—12th century. The temple has undergone renovations, and new shrines were added to the temple complex. The temple is a yellow sandstone structure and is considered an excellent example of North Indian architecture. The main shrine houses an 4 metres (13 ft) idol of Shantinatha. The sub-shrines were erected in 18th—19th century by an accountant serving in the court of House of Bhonsle during the reign of Raghoji I Bhonsle. The temple Complex Premise includes Pratibhasthali, Sant Bhavan, Manastambha.

The temple also has a dharamshala equipped with modern facilities, including a bhojanalaya (restaurant).

== Aacharya Vidhyasagar's Contribution ==
Aacharya Vidhyasagar had done five Chaturmas in Ramtek in his Aacharya Tenure in the year 1993, 1994, 2008, 2013 and 2017. Aacharya Shri had given inspiration for construction of Educational Intitution for Girls in Ramtek named Pratibhasthali. It was Inaugurated on 4 February 2014. On 10 August 2013, Saturday, Shravan Shukla Chaturthi, V.S. 2070. Aacharya Shri initiated Twenty Four Monks in Ramtek. (Note: Munishree Niswarth sagar ji, Munishree Nirdosh sagar ji, Munishree Nirlobh sagar ji, Munishree Neeroga Sagar ji, Munishree Nirmohsagar ji, Munishree Nishpakshysagar ji, Munishree Nishprahsagar ji, Munishree Nischalsagar ji, Munishree Nishkampsagar ji, Munishri Nishpandasagar ji, Munishri Niramayasagar ji, Munishri Nirapadsagar ji, Munishri Nirakulasagar ji, Munishri Nirupamsagar ji, Munishri Nishkamsagar ji, Munishree Nirihasagar ji, Munishree Nissimsagar ji, Munishree Nirbhiksagar ji, Munishree Neeragsagar ji, Munishree Neerajsagar ji, Munishree Nikalankasagar ji, Munishree Nirmadsagar ji, Munishree Nirsagsagar ji, Munishree Nissangsagar ji)

== Gallery ==
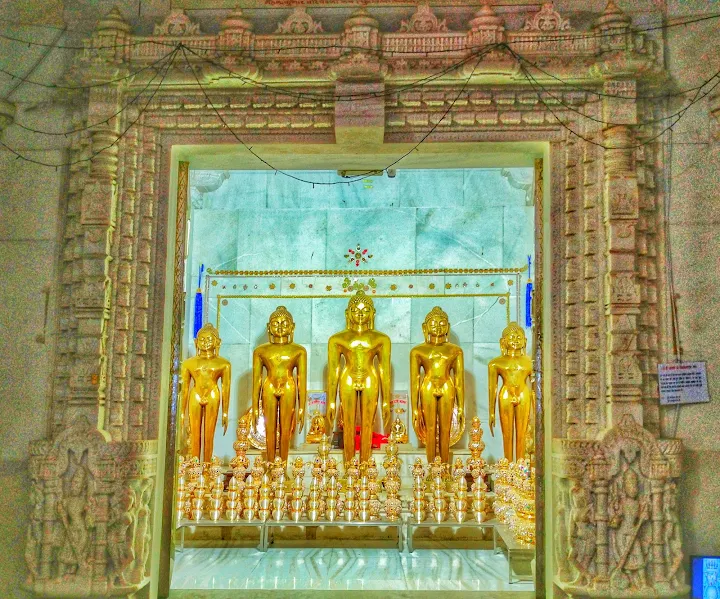
Ramtek Panch Balyati Temple Main Sanctum

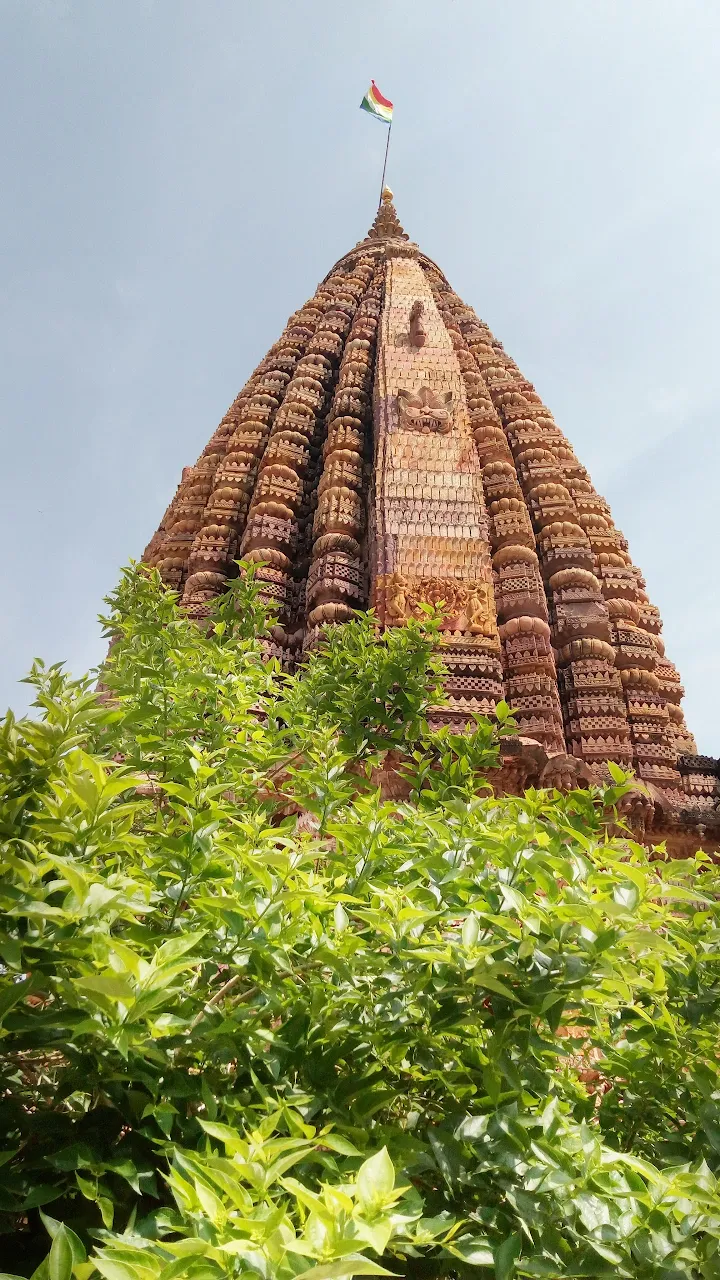
Main Temple Shikhara

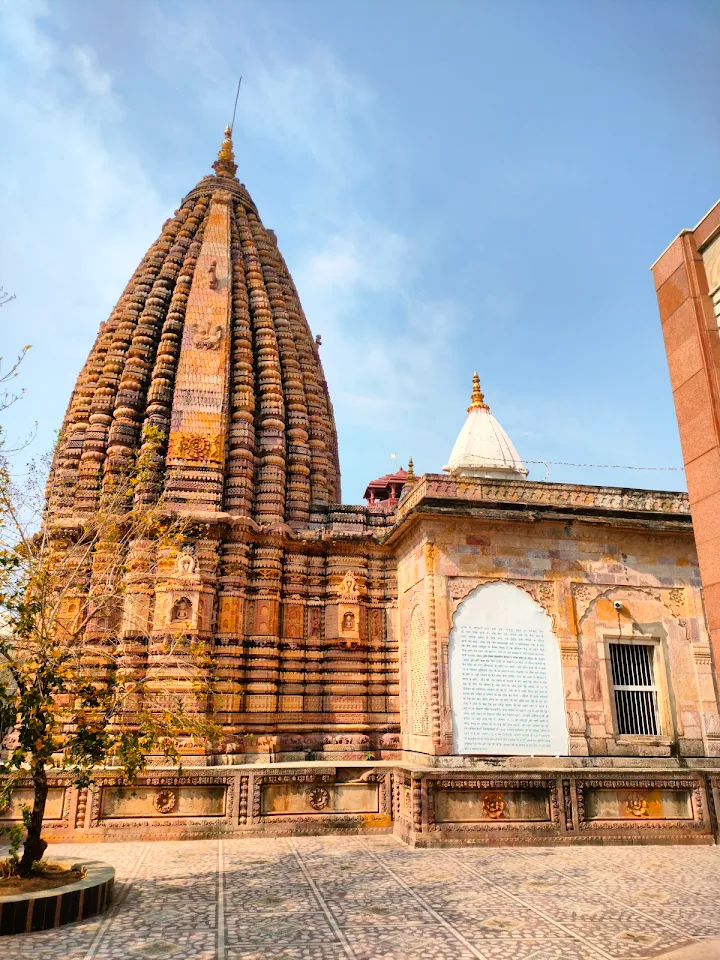
Outer Enclosure of Shantinatha Temple

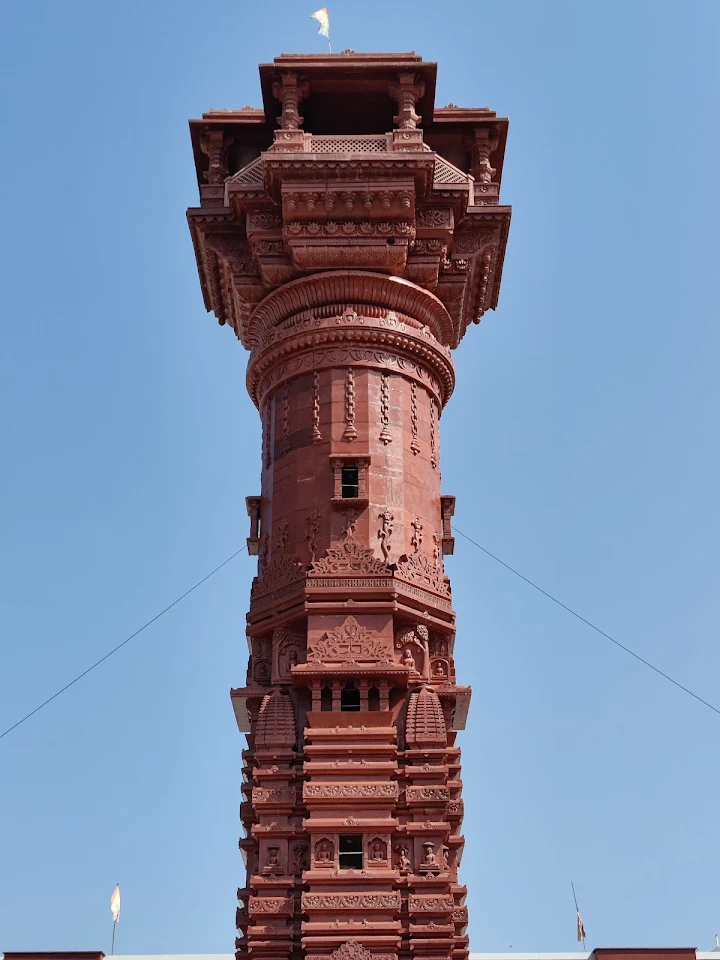
New Manstambha built in 2010s

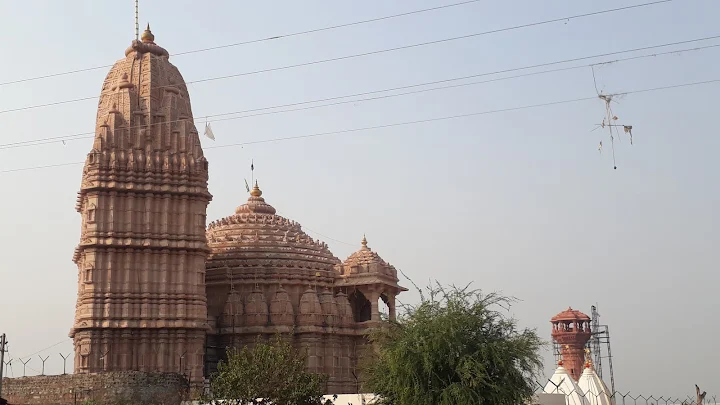
Panch Balyati Temple

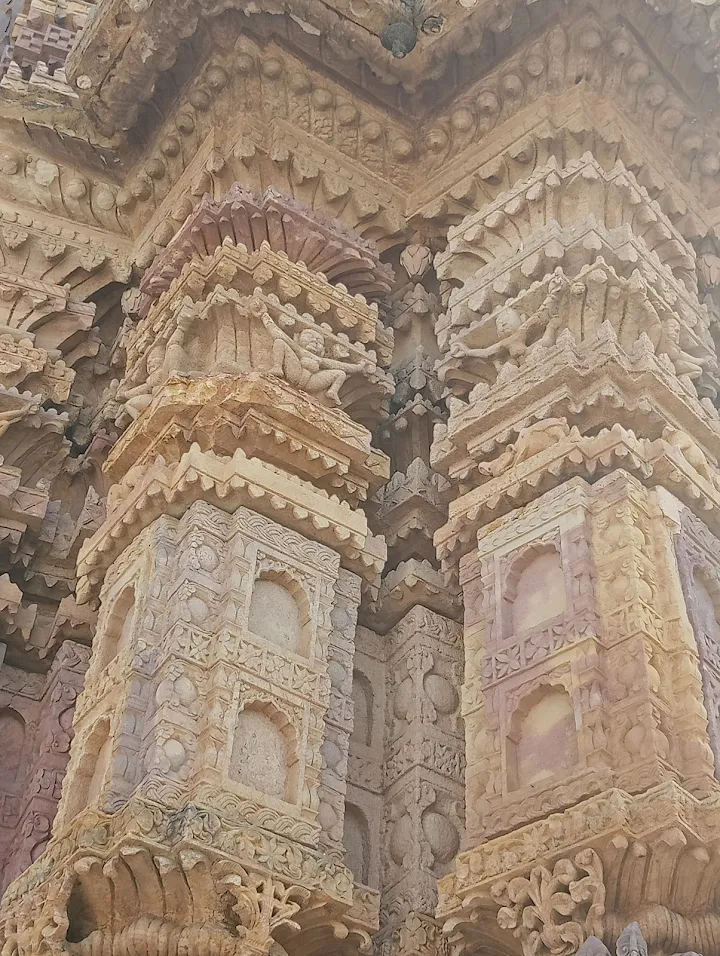
Outer Carvings

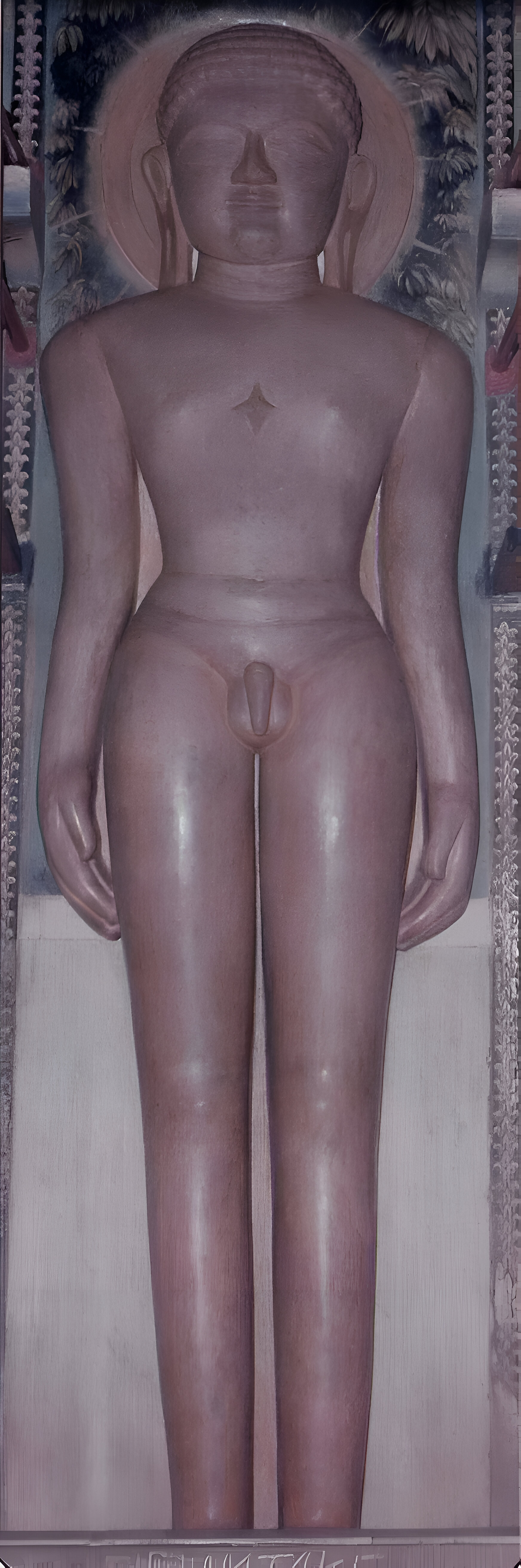
13 feet (4.0 m) Shantinatha idol

== See also ==
- Gajpanth
- Kumbhoj
