= Karmaveer Bhaurao Patil College =

College in Navi Mumbai

Rayat Shikshan Sanstha's Karmaveer Bhaurao Patil College Vashi Navi Mumbai (formerly known as Modern College Vashi ) is a college in Juhu Nagar (Vashi) Navi Mumbai. The college was established in 1979 and was affiliated with the University of Mumbai, but is now conferred with Autonomy since 2018 and attained empowered status in 2023. The college is named after Karmaveer Bhaurao Patil, a social activist and educationist and the founder of the Rayat Education Society. In 2024 the College was reccredited by NAAC with an A++ CGPA 3.51 & 'Best College Award' by the University of Mumbai.

The college offers 3 year Bachelor's and 2 year master's degrees in the fields of Arts - Psychology, english, geography, geoinformatics, economics. In Science- Chemistry, physics, Mathematics, Microbiology, biotechnology, technology, and commerce. It also offers professional courses like Information Technology (IT), Computer Science (CS), Data Science, PG Diploma in Medical Lab Technology, Bachelor in Account and Finanace (BAF), Bachelor in Banking and Insurance (BBI), Logistics & Supply Management. It also has a junior college XI and XII (+2 level) which offers Higher Secondary courses in Arts, Commerce, and Science streams under Maharashtra State Board of Secondary and Higher Secondary Education.

Apart from the Mumbai University courses the college also runs following courses:

- National Service Scheme
- National Cadet Corps
- Yashwantrao Chavan Maharashtra Open University - Bachelor of Arts degrees and Bachelor of Commerce degrees through correspondence cum coaching.
- Diploma in Medical Laboratory Technology (DMLT).
- Certified course in Computer Science
- Minimum Competency Courses in
  - Medical Laboratory Technique
  - Marketing and Salesmanship

== Address ==
Rayat Shikshan Sanstha's Karmaveer Bhaurao Patil College (Modern College)
Sector 15 A, Juhunagar
Vashi, Navi Mumbai-400703.
