= Saitwal =

Sect in Jainism

Saitwal (or Swahitwal) is a Digambara Jain community of Maharashtra. Swahitwal means that they work for the benefit of their inner self (Swa+hit+wal).

Saitwal community is largely concentrated in Maharashtra state, though people from Saitwal community can be found in all over India.

== History ==
Several Jain authors were born in this community. This includes Pasakirti (Sudarshana Charitra, shaka 1549), Brahma Matisagar (Adinath panchkalyanaka, shaka 1732), Nemsagar (shaka 1675-1776) etc.

A bronze image of Chandraprabha has been discussed by J. C. Wright that has an inscription mentioning that it was installed by a person of Sehitavāla jati in Śaka Year 1559 (A.D. 1638) under the supervision of Bhattaraka Vijayakīrti.

== Religious organizations ==
The Dakshin Bharat Jain Sabha is a religious and social service organization of the Jains of South India. The organization is headquartered at Kolhapur, Maharashtra, India. The association is credited with being one of the first Jain associations to start reform movements among the Jains in modern India. The organization mainly seeks to represent the interests of the native Jains of Maharashtra (Marathi Jains), Karnataka (Kannada Jains) and Goa.

== See also ==
- Acharya Aryanandi
- Jainism in Maharashtra
- Jainism in Karnataka
