= Jainism in Mumbai =

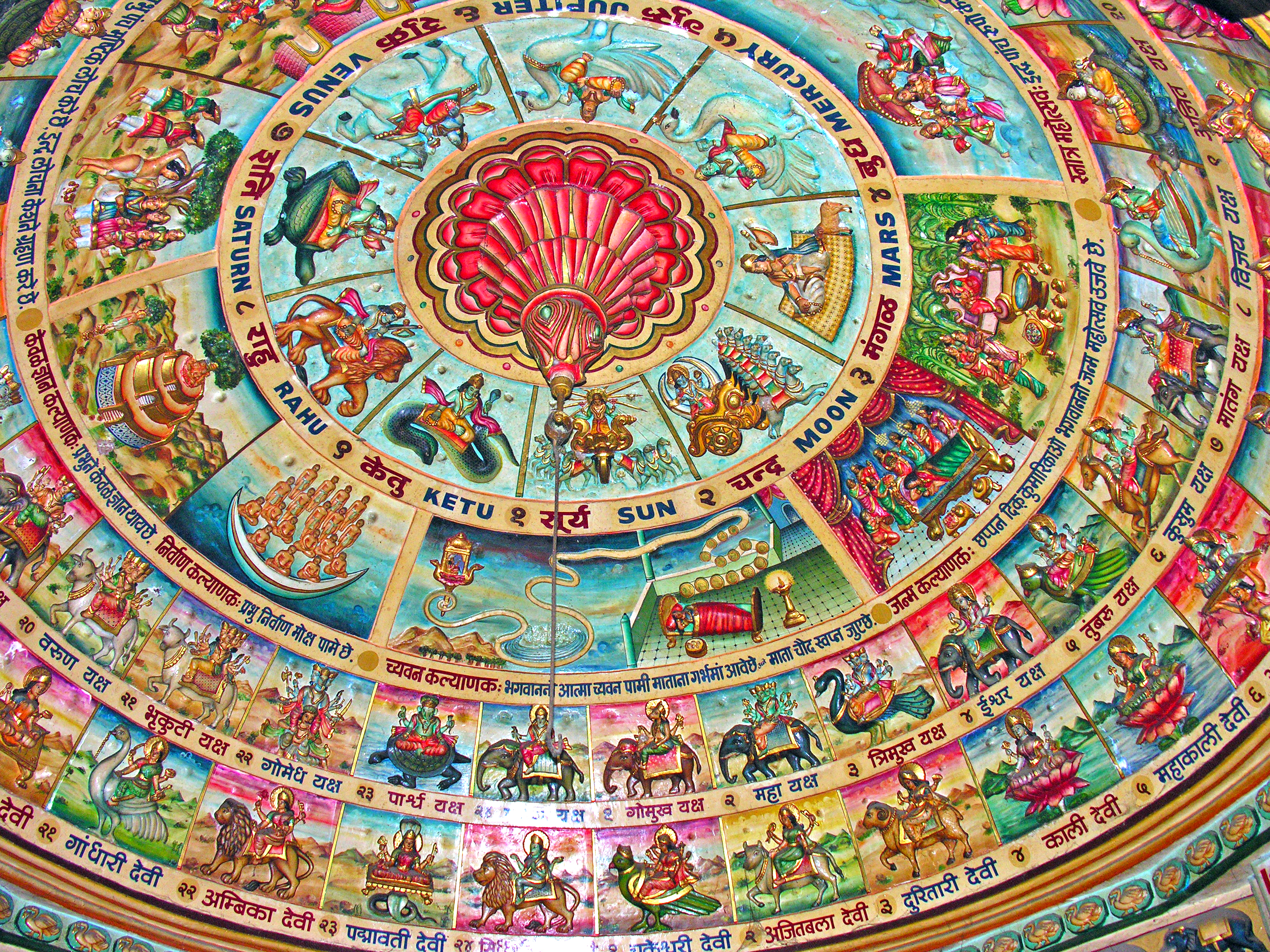
Inner dome of the Jain temple at Walkeshwar, Mumbai

Mumbai has one of the largest populations of Jains among all the cities in India. Mumbai also has numerous Jain temples. One of the best known is the Babu Amichand Panalal Adishwarji Jain Temple, Walkeshwar (Malabar Hill).

On Mahavira Janma Kalyanak of 2019, more than 108 Sanghas of Mumbai together hosted Varghoda which ended at Godiji Parshvanath temple.

== Godiji Parshwanath Temple ==
The Godiji Parshwanath Temple in Pydhonie is one of the oldest Jain temple in Mumbai, constructed in 1812. The white idol of the mulnayak Tirthankar Godi Parshwanatha was brought from an ancient temple at Hamirpur in Rajasthan.

== Religious organisations ==
The Dakshin Bharat Jain Sabha is a religious and social service organisation of the Jains of South India. The organisation is headquartered at Sangli, Maharashtra, India. The association is credited with being one of the first Jain associations to start reform movements among the Jains in modern India. The organisation mainly seeks to represent the interests of the native Jains of Maharashtra (Marathi Jains), Karnataka (Kannada Jains) and Goa.

== See also ==
- Jainism in Maharashtra
- Godiji Parshwanath
