= Kumbhoj Jain temple =

Kumbhoj Bahubali
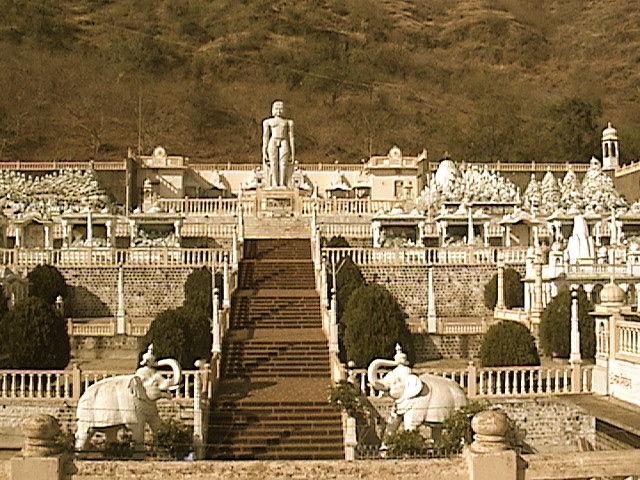
- 28 feet Bahubali statue, Kumbhoj

- Location within Maharashtra

Religion
- Affiliation: Jainism
- Sect: Digambara and Śvetāmbara
- Deity: Bahubali
- Festivals: Mahavir Jayanti, Diwali

Location
- Location: Kumbhoj, Kolhapur
- Coordinates: 16°49′17.9″N 74°26′41.5″E

Architecture
- Creator: Bijjala II
- Established: 1156 AD
- Temple: 14

Website
- https://jinsenmathnandani.in/

Kumbhoj Jain temple is a Jain pilgrimage centre near Kumbhoj in Kolhapur district, Maharashtra, India. The site is particularly known for a large marble statue of Bahubali and for its Digambara Jain temples.

== Location ==
The pilgrimage centre is situated near the town of Kumbhoj in the Hatkanangale area of Kolhapur district. The site is associated with the wider Jain religious landscape of southern Maharashtra.

== History ==
Kolhapur was established as Jain capital in 1056 CE under reign of Bijjala II, Western Chalukya Empire. Kumbhoj has been associated with the Digambara Jain tradition for several centuries. The Kumbhoj Jain temples and Nandani Jain math have been associated with a historic Bhattaraka seat.

The modern development of the Kumbhoj Bahubali centre is particularly associated with its large image of Bahubali. The statue was installed in 1963. In 1816, Bhattaraka allowed Śvetāmbara trader to install Śvetāmbara idol to Jain temple on top of the hill and a Śvetāmbara temple was constructed to 1938.

The Kannada poet Gunavarma II completed his work Udyogsara at the Chandranatha Basadi.

== Bahubali statue ==
The 28 feet (8.5 m) colossal idol of Bahubali in the kayotsarga posture, erected in 1963, is a major attraction. The idol is carved out of white marble unlike majority colossal of Bahubali that are carved out of granite. The idol stands on the a lotus pedestal with carving of Chavundaraya, commissioned the construction of Gommateshwara statue at Shravanabelagola, along with Gullakayaji or Gomati-devi.

The statue belongs to the modern period and is considerably later than the medieval monolithic images of Bahubali at Shravanabelagola, Karkala and Venur.

== Temple complex ==
The Kumbhoj pilgrimage centre contains several Digambara Jain temples, a Jain matha, one Svetambara temple and colossal Bahubali statue. The complex has developed around the principal Bahubali image and functions as a centre of Jain worship, pilgrimage and religious activity. The Jain Matha of Kumbhoj is notable for having the richest Jain literature collection in Southern India with manuscripts written major in Kannada along with Sanskrit and Magadhi. The temple complex includes a dharmasala and a gurukula (charitable school) setup in 1934.

The temple complex is part of Maharashtra's Jain circuit.

== See also ==
- Gommateshwara statue, Karkala
- Gommateshwara statue
