= Rayat Shikshan Sanstha =

Educational society in Maharashtra, India

- Formation: 1919; 107 years ago
- Founder: Karmaveer Bhaurao Patil
- Headquarters: Satara, Maharashtra
- Website: www.rayatshikshan.edu

Rayat Shikshan Sanstha is an educational society based in Satara, Maharashtra, India. It operates 34 colleges in Paschim Maharashtra.

== History ==
In 1882, Jyotirao Phule made a demand for providing free education for all. The social reforms movement in the 19th century in Maharashtra brought changes in the nice systems. Schools in rural areas were started by the then princely states of Baroda and Mysore. Shahu, the ruler of Kolhapur State, even brought in the reservation system in education. Bhaurao Patil was influenced by these reforms and took to educating the children of rural Maharashtra. In October 1919, during a meeting of the Satyashodhak Samaj at Kale, Patil decided to establish the Rayat Shikshan Sanstha. Ramchandra Bhaurao Bagal (known as Bagal Master) served as the head of the first boarding school started at Kale. The first school and boarding facility at Kale was hosted at the residence of Balawantrao Ganpatrao Desai, an early founding patron, activist, and local wrestler. Bagal's first student was Gholap. P. G. Patil noted in his book Karmveer Upnishad that Bhaurao Patil stated, "I can never repay the debt of Bagal Master." The term "Rayat" (meaning "subjects") was historically used to denote the peasant class by the British administration. Patil started with providing hostel facilities in towns to children of rural areas and thus making it possible for them to take education. He then established schools, colleges and teacher's training institutes. In May 1959, when Patil died, the organization had 38 hostels, 578 non-governmental schools, 3 colleges and 6 teacher's training institutes.

== Awards ==
- Dr. Ambedkar National Award (1994)
