= Gajpanth =

Digambar Jain pilgrimage site in Maharashtra

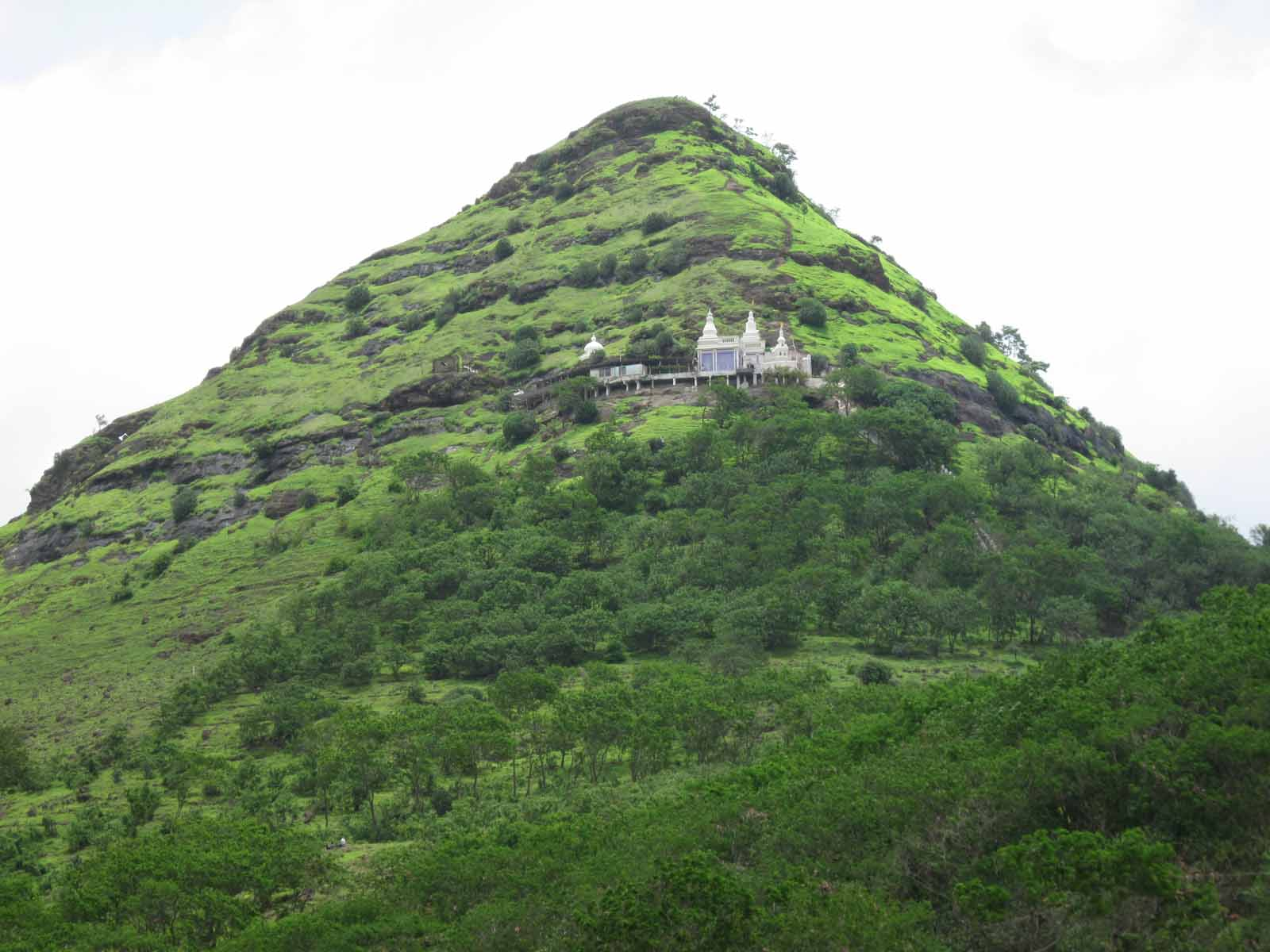
- Distant view of Gajpanth Digambar Jain Siddhakshetra (Trust No. A-193/NSK)

- Gajpanth

Religion
- Affiliation: Jainism
- Deity: Parshvanatha

Location
- Location: Nashik, Maharashtra
- Coordinates: 20.0660776°N 73.7929811°E

Specifications
- Temple: 6
- Elevation: 122 m (400 ft)

Website
- https://gajpantha.com

Gajpanth (also spelled Gajpantha) is a Digambar Jain pilgrimage site (Siddha-kshetra) located in Mhasrul village, in the Nashik district of the Indian state of Maharashtra. It is managed and maintained by Registered Trust No. A-193/NSK.

== Geography ==
The pilgrimage is located in the Indian state of Maharashtra. It is 16 km (10 mi) from the Nashik Road Railway station and 5 km (3 mi) from Nashik City, and is situated on the steep slopes of a 400-foot-high (122 m) hill. The pilgrimage site is accessible via a staircase built in black stone, which leads directly to the temple. The hill has 450 steps, three caves (known as 'chamar leni'), and several temples belonging to the Digambara sect of the Jains. There is also a sculpture depicting samavasarana (divine preaching hall of tirthankara) on the hills of Gajpanth.

The caves are also known as Chambhar Lena. They are situated on the southeastern face of an isolated hill near Mhasrul, approximately 8 km north of Nashik. The hill rises about 183 metres above the surrounding plain, while the caves are approximately 137 metres above its base. The complex consists of three rock-cut caves. The present approach to the caves includes a flight of 435 steps, constructed in 1870. Earlier, only the upper part of the steep ascent had a roughly dressed-stone staircase consisting of 173 steps.

== History ==
Gajpanth is said to be the salvation place of seven Balabhadra (heroes) of the Jain Universal history, known as Vijay, Achal, Sudharma, Suprabh, Nandi, Nandimitra and Sudarshan. It is believed that the saints took eight crores (80 million) of Yadav kings with them from this location to salvation, and that many Jain monks (or sadhus) attained moksha from this hill.

The name Gajapantha occurs in Jain literary sources. The Prakrit text Nirvanakanda associates Gajapanthagiri with the liberation of seven Balabhadras and numerous Yadava kings. The Sanskrit Nirvanabhakti refers to the site as Gajapantha. A commentary attributed to Acharya Srutasagara identifies it as Gajadhvaja-Gajapantha, a mountain near Nashik.

The site is also mentioned in the Tirthavachanachandrika of Gunabhadra, dated to about 1575 CE, among Digambara pilgrimage sites. Jain literary evidence therefore demonstrates that Gajapantha was recognised as a pilgrimage centre by the medieval period.

Acharya Srutasagara is recorded as having undertaken a pilgrimage to Gajapanthagiri sometime between 1445 and 1465 CE.

=== Caves ===
The three caves at Gajapantha have undergone extensive renovation. By the time of modern archaeological documentation, the interiors had been altered with marble flooring, iron gates and whitewashing, while a number of sculptures had been retouched. These alterations make it difficult to reconstruct the original architectural and sculptural appearance of the caves.

The caves contain images of Tirthankaras and attendant figures. A large standing Jina is positioned beside the principal doorway, while the interior contains seated images of Parshvanatha. One of the principal Parshvanatha images is accompanied by Sarvanubhuti and Ambika as well as standing chauri-bearers.

The cave complex also contains a representation of a chauvisi, or group of the twenty-four Tirthankaras. Several loose images are preserved within the caves, although the modern alterations make it difficult to distinguish original sculptures from later additions.

=== Date and development ===
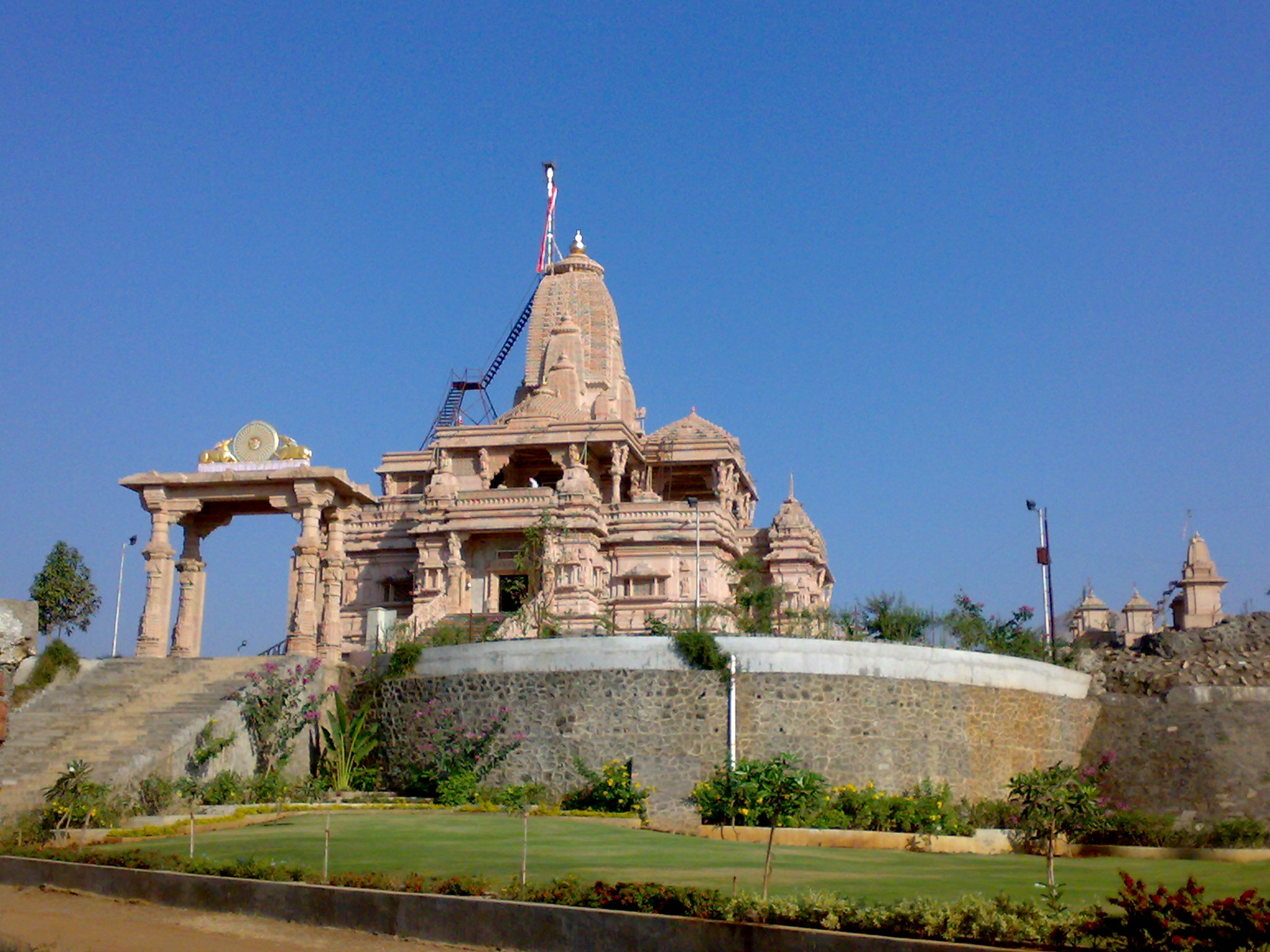
Dharmachakra Jain temple

The precise date of excavation of the Gajapantha caves is uncertain. Shah notes that an early reference to the site occurs in the late 10th century CE, while the architectural and iconographic characteristics of the surviving caves suggest a later date. The caves are therefore best regarded as a medieval Jain rock-cut complex rather than being assigned solely to the period of the earliest literary reference.

Shah places the excavation and development of the caves broadly in the late 11th to early 12th century CE. He suggests that the hill may have been associated with Jainism before the caves were excavated and subsequently embellished with rock-cut shrines.

According to Shah, Gajapantha remained an active Jain pilgrimage centre from the period of its excavation until at least the late 17th century. The site may subsequently have been neglected for a period before being revived in the modern period.

== Modern period ==
The caves were renovated and brought under Jain management during the modern period. A temple and dharmashala are located at the foot of the hill, while additional Jain facilities are present in Mhasrul village. Shah describes Gajapantha as a popular Digambara Jain pilgrimage centre in the early 21st century.

== See also ==
- Mangi-Tungi
- Ramtek Jain temple
