= Dakshin Bharat Jain Sabha =

Religious organization in India

- zone of influence
- Formation: 3 April 1899; 127 years ago
- Type: Jain religious organization
- Headquarters: Sangli, Maharashtra India
- Region served: India
- Official language: Marathi and Kannada
- President: Raosaheb A. Patil
- Key people: Various Jains
- Main organ: Pragati Ani Jinvijay
- Affiliations: Various Jain organizations
- Website: www.dbjainsabha.com

Dakshin Bharat Jain Sabha (DBJS), also known as the South Indian Jain Association, is a religious and social service organization of the Jains in India. The organization is headquartered at Kolhapur, Maharashtra, India. The association is credited with being one of the first Jain associations to start reform movements among the Jains in modern India. The organization mainly seeks to represent the interests of the native Jains of Maharashtra (Marathi Jains), Karnataka (Kannada Jains) and Goa.

== History ==
The organization was founded in 1899. It was originally found to represent the Jains of the southern Maratha Country of the Bombay Presidency, including Kolhapur State, Belgaum and Sangli. The organization was established for the socio-economic and educational betterment of the Jain community. It has been credited for fostering a stronger sense of Jain identity and for ushering in social reforms in the Jain community. The association sought to invest authority in lay persons rather than in ascetics, this resulted in mobilization of the community to build schools and improve education.

The current president of the organization is Raosaheb A. Patil.

== Community service ==
The organization has been involved in securing the status of an independent and minority religion for Jainism in India.

The organization funds various educational institutions. They also offer scholarships to meritorious Jain students from South India.

They also honor distinguished people from the Jain community annually. The Karmveer Bhaurao Patil Samaj Seva Puraskar awards are given annually to notable personalities. There are also awards presented for excellence in journalism.

Dakshin Bharat Jain Sabha runs several boarding houses for young Jains that provide free or low cost accommodation with social and religious activities. These include

- Digamber Jain Boarding Hubli, est. 1909
- Sheth R. D. Dawada Digamber Jain Boarding, Sangli, 1918
- Digambar Jain Boarding, Kolhapur, 1905. (associated with Dr. A. N. Upadhye, Veerachary Babasaheb Kuchnure)
- Manikbag Digambar Jain Boarding, Belgaum, 1911
- Digamber Jain Boarding, Ichalkaranji, 1923
- Jain Shravikashram, Kolhapur, 1908
- Shrimatibai Kalantre Jain Mahilashram, Sangli, 1918
- Late Sou. Sumanbai Rajabhau Kala Jain Shravikashram, Aurangabad

The boarding houses served an important function by uniting Jains of different communities, as reported in Pragati ani Jinavijaya, 23 November 1919:

At mealtime affairs were conducted beautifully, as they were at the opening of the Jain Boarding in Pune. All the old and new members who came were seen eating together in one line with great love and open minds. It was seen that the roots of division were disappearing from this tiny community.

== Publications ==
Pragati Ani Jinvijay is published by the organization as its main organ. It was first published in 1902. The magazine is published in Marathi and Dr. Subhash Chandra Akkole was its past editor. It is published monthly from Kolhapur. The noted Marathi author, Veeranuyayi Appa Bhau Magdum was a contributor to this magazine.

== See also ==
- Legal status of Jainism as a distinct religion in India
- Jainism in Maharashtra
- Jainism in North Karnataka
- Jainism in Karnataka
- Jainism in Tulu Nadu
- Jainism in Kerala
- Jainism in Tamil Nadu
