= Hinduism and Jainism =

Ancient Indian religions

Hinduism and Jainism are two ancient Indian religions. There are some similarities and differences between the two religions. Temples, gods, rituals, fasts and other religious components of Jainism are different from those of Hinduism.

"Jain" is derived from the word Jina, referring to a human being who has conquered all inner passions (like anger, attachment, greed and pride) and possesses kevala jnana (pure infinite knowledge). Followers of the path shown by the Jinas are called Jains. Followers of Vedas who worship Brahman, Vishnu or Shiva and other Vedic deities are called Hindus.

== Philosophical similarities and differences ==
Jainism and Hinduism have many similar characteristic features, including the concepts of samsara, karma and moksha. However, they differ over the precise nature and meaning of these concepts. The doctrine Nyaya-Vaisheshika and samkhya school had minor similarities with Jain philosophy. The Jain doctrine teaches atomism which is also adopted in the Vaisheshika system and atheism which is found in Samkhya. Within the doctrine of Jainism, there exist many metaphysical concepts which are not known in Hinduism, some of which are dharma and Adharma tattva (which are seen as substances within the Jain metaphysical system), Gunasthanas and Lesyas. The epistemological concepts of Anekantavada and Syadvada are not found in the Hindu system. There were, in the past, probable attempts made to merge the concepts of Hindu gods and the Tirthankara of Jainism. The cosmography of Hindus resembles that of the Jains and there are similar names of heavenly gods within these systems.

In the Upanishads, there also occur the first statements of the view, dominant in Jainist teachings and elsewhere, that rebirth is undesirable and that it is possible by controlling or stopping one's actions to put an end to it and attain a state of deliverance (moksha) which lies beyond action.

=== Moksha (liberation) ===
In Hinduism, moksha means merging of soul with universal soul or eternal being and escaping the cycle of births and deaths; in Jainism, it is blissful existence with infinite knowledge. In Vedic philosophy, salvation is giving up the sense of being a doer and realizing Self to be the same as Universe and God. In Jainism, salvation can be achieved only through self-effort and is considered to be the right of human beings.

In Jainism, one definite path to attain liberation (moksha) is prescribed. The prescribed threefold path consists of the three jewels of Jainism (Right perception, Right knowledge, Right conduct). In Hinduism, one definite path to salvation is not known.

=== Universe ===
According to Jain cosmology, the primary structure of the universe is eternal: it is neither created nor can it be destroyed, but undergoes continuous natural transformations within. In Hinduism, Brahman is the unchanging ultimate reality and the single binding unity behind diversity in all that exists in the universe.

=== Karma ===
Karma is an invisible force in Hinduism, whereas in Jainism it is a form of particulate matter which can adhere to the soul. As per Jainism, the consequence of karma occurs by natural nirjara of karma particles from the soul. Hindus rejected this concept and believe that the God or the creator of this universe is karmaphaldata, and rewards the fruits of past actions to each individual.

=== Worship ===
In Hinduism, Gods are worshiped in several ways and for several reasons such as knowledge, peace, wisdom, health, and it also believed to be one's duty to pray god as God is considered as our maker (as we originated from them and we are staying in them and at last will merge with them), for moksha, and are also offered food as a respect, etc. In Jainism, enlightened human perfect masters or siddhas represent the true goal of all human beings, and their qualities are worshiped by the Jains.

=== Self-defence and soldiering ===
Jains and Hindus have opinion that violence in self-defence can be justified, and they agree that a soldier who kills enemies in combat is performing a legitimate duty. Jain communities accepted the use of military power for their defence, there were Jain monarchs, military commanders, and soldiers.

== Women ==
The religion of Jains included women in their fourfold sangha; the religious order of Jain laymen, laywomen, monks and nuns. There was a disagreement between early Hinduism, and ascetic movements such as Jainism with the scriptural access to women. However, the early svetambara scriptures prevented pregnant women, young women or those who have a small child, to enter the ranks of nun. Regardless, the number of nuns given in those texts were always double the number of monks. Parshvanatha and Mahavira, the two historical tirthankaras, had large numbers of female devotees and ascetics. Mahavira and other Jain monks are credited with raising the status of women.

== Religious texts ==
Hindus do not accept any Jain text and Jains do not recognize any Hindu scripture.

=== The Vedas ===
The scriptures known as Vedas are regarded by Hindus as one of the foundations of Hinduism. According to Manusmriti those who rejected the Vedas as the prime source of religious knowledge were labeled "nāstika". As a consequence, Jainism and Buddhism were categorized as nāstika darśana.

The orthodox schools of Hinduism, such as Vedanta, Mimamsa and Samkhya, claim the Sruti do not have any author and hence are supreme to other religious scriptures. This position was countered by Jains who said that saying Vedas are authorless was equivalent to saying that anonymous poems are written by nobody. Jain scriptures, on the contrary, were believed by them to be of human origin, brought through omniscient teachers, and hence claimed greater worth. According to Jains, the origin of Vedas lies with Marichi, the son of Bharata Chakravarti, who was the son of the first Tirthankara Rishabha. Jains maintain that these scriptures were later modified. Jains pointed that Hindus do not know their own scriptures since they were unaware of the names of tirthankaras present in Vedas.

Jains had a long-standing debate with Mimamsa school of Hinduism. Kumarila Bhatta, a proponent of Mimamsa school, argued that the Vedas are the source of all knowledge and it is through them that humans can differentiate between right and wrong. Jain monks, such as Haribhadra, held that humans are already in possession of all the knowledge, which only needs to be illuminated or uncovered in order to gain the status of omniscience.

==== Vedic sacrifices ====
The practice of Vedic animal sacrifices was opposed by Jains. Acharya Hemchandra, a Jain monk, cites passages from Manusmriti, one of the law book of Hindus, to demonstrate how, in light of false scriptures, Hindus have resorted to violence. Akalanka, another Jain monk, sarcastically said that if killing can result in enlightenment, one should become a hunter or fisherman.

=== Hindu epics and Jain epics ===
The rejection of Jain epics and scriptures were dominant in Hinduism since very early times. On the other hand, central Hindu scriptures and epics like Vedas, Mahabharata and Ramayana are categorized as unreliable scriptures in Nandi-sutra, one of the svetambara's canonical literature. Later, Jains adapted various Hindu epics in accordance with their own system. There were disputes between Jains and Hindus in form of these epics.

== Jain deities and Hindu texts ==
Within the doctrine of Jainism, the tirthankara holds the highest status. Hemachandra Acharya says that a Jindeva is the one who has conquered his internal desires and passions. This requirement, according to him, was fulfilled only by the tirthankara. Hence their path for spiritual upliftment and salvation is rejected by the Jains.

Some personages mentioned in the Vedas and Jain scriptures are identified to be the same. There is mention of Rishabha, identified with the first tirthankara, Rishabhanatha, in the Rigveda and the Vishnu Purana. The Rigveda, X. 12. 166 states:

O Rudra-like Divinity ! do thou produce amongst us, of high descent, a Great God, like Rishabha Deva, by becoming Arhan, which is the epithet of the first World Teacher; let Him become the destroyer of the enemies !

The Vishnu Purana also names Rishabha:

ऋषभो मरुदेव्याश्च ऋषभात भरतो भवेत्
भरताद भारतं वर्षं, भरतात सुमतिस्त्वभूत्
Rishabha was born to Marudevi, Bharata was born to Rishabha,
Bharatavarsha (India) arose from Bharata, and Sumati arose from Bharata.

—Vishnu Purana (2,1,31)

In the Skanda Purana (chapter 37) it is stated that "Rishabha was the son of Nabhiraja, and Rishabha had a son named Bharata, and after the name of this Bharata, this country is known as Bharata-varsha."

In the Brahmottara-candam section of the Brahma Purana, the narrator Suta describes many matters relating to Shaivism and in the 16th portion, there is a story about Bhadrabahu receiving instructions in a mantra from a yogi named Rishabha.

The Linga Purana states that in every Kali Yuga, Shiva incarnates on earth, and that in one Kali Yuga he was a Yogeshvara (one of his 28 incarnations) named Rishabha.

In the Shiva Purana, in order to assist the devas against the tyranny of the Tripurasura brothers, Vishnu sought to convert the asuras from their devotion to Shiva and Vedic practices to beliefs that are implied to be Jainism. He created a man called Arihat, instructing him to use his maya (illusory power) to create a deceptive sacred scripture that opposes the shruti and smriti texts, as well as the varna and the ashrama systems. The man and his followers initiated the Tripurasura brothers into their religion, abandoning the worship of the Hindu gods and traditional rites. This offers Shiva the pretext of destroying the three cities of the asuras, who had previously worshipped him, and restore order.

== History ==
Jainism is considered to be distinct and separate from Vedic religion and originated from Sramana or Arahata tradition.

=== Ancient ===
Jains and Hindus have coexisted in the Indian subcontinent since at least the second century BCE.

=== Medieval ===
Competition between Jains and Vedic Brahmins, between Jains and Hindu Shaivas, is a frequent motif of all medieval western Indian narratives, but the two communities for the most part coexisted and coprospered. Shaiva kings patronised Jain mendicants, and Jain officials patronised Brahmana poets.

=== Decline of Jainism ===
Around the 8th century CE, Hindu philosopher Ādi Śaṅkarācārya tried to restore the Vedic religion. Śaṅkarācārya brought forward the doctrine of Advaita. The Vaishnavism and Shaivism also began to rise. This was particularly in the southern Indian states.

According to a Saivite legend, the Pandya king Koon Pandiyan ordered a massacre of 8,000 Jain monks. This event is depicted graphically in walls of Tivatur in North Arcot. However, this legend is not found in any Jain text, and is believed to be a fabrication made up by the Saivites to prove their dominance.

== Jains and the Hindu society ==
Jain scholars and some monks in general allowed a sort of cautious integration with the Hindu society. In today's date, there are a lot of common aspects in social and cultural life of Hindus and Jains. It is quite difficult to differentiate a lay Jain from a lay Hindu. The Jain code of conduct is quite similar to that which is found in Hindu Dharmasashtra, Manusmriti and other Law books of Brahmans. The difference in the rituals of practitioners of the two religions would be that the Jains do not give any importance to bathing in holy water. According to religious scholar M. Whitney Kelting, some of the "names and narratives" in the Hindu's list of satis are also found in the Jain tradition. In the Hindu context, a sati is a virtuous wife who protects her husband and his family and has the "intention to die before, or with," her husband. Kelting notes that those satis who die on the funeral pyre of their husband, or who "intended to die" but were prevented from death, may attain a status called satimata. Kelting says that the Jain tradition, due to principle of non-violence and equanimity, does not allow self-immolation. They, instead, see renunciation rather than self-sacrifice as the highest ideal for a Jain sati. Hindus think Jainism is simply another branch of Hinduism. Jain historians like Champat Rai Jain, held that Hindus are Jaina allegorists who have allegorised the Jain teachings.

=== Hindu revivalism and Indian identities ===
With the onset of British colonialism, select groups of Indians developed responses to the British dominance and the British critique of Hinduism. In this context, various responses toward Jainism developed.

==== Dayanand Saraswati and the Arya Samaj ====
The Arya Samaj was founded by Dayanand Saraswati (1824–1883), who authored Satyarth Prakash, a book containing the basic teachings of Saraswati and the Arya Samaj. It contains "Dayananda's bitter criticisms of the major non-Vedic religions of Indian origins." In the Satyarth Prakash, he writes that he regarded Jainism as "the most dreadful religion", and that Jains are "possessed of defective and childish understanding." However, several scholars say that none of his claims have any solid foundation and that they are merely aggressive, negative, unexplained and devoid of context, and intolerant in nature. (Note: Daniels cites Dayanand in his investigation of the claim that "Hinduism is the most tolerant of all religions and Hindu tolerance is the best answer in fostering peace and harmony in a multi-religious society", taking Swami Vivekananda, Swami Dayananda and Mahatama Gandhi as cases. He asks the question "Why was Dayananda so aggressive and negative in his response to other religions?". Panicker also mentions that Dayanand's views are "strongly condemnatory, predominantly negative and positively intolerant and aggressive.") Prominent Svetambara Jain monk, Acharya Labdhisuri, wrote a scripture Dayananda Kutarka Timiratarani to refute these claims made by Dayanand Saraswati.

== Relations ==
Under the rule of Subhatvarman (1194–1209 CE), a Parmara ruler in central India, Jainism faced hardships as a result of the ruler's animosity towards the religion. Subhatavarman attacked Gujarat and plundered large number of Jain temples in Dabhoi and Cambay in 11th century. Subhatavarman, during his campaigns in Lata, destroyed numerous Jain temples. Throughout the centuries, there were periods of hostility in the South as well, affecting both Buddhism and Jainism. Inscriptions from the Srisailam area of Andhra Pradesh record the pride taken by Veerashaiva chiefs in beheading of shwetambar Jains.

== See also ==
- Legal status of Jainism as a distinct religion in India
- Religious harmony in India
- History of Jainism

== Sources ==
- George, Vensus A. (2008), Paths to the Divine: Ancient and Indian, vol. XII, The Council for Research in Values and Philosophy, ISBN 978-1-56518-248-6
- Springer (2012), International Journal of Hindu Studies, Vol. 16, No. 3, December 2012
- Nicholson, Andrew J. (2010), Unifying Hinduism: Philosophy and Identity in Indian Intellectual History, Columbia University Press
- Kelting, M. Whitney (2009), Heroic Wives Rituals, Stories and the Virtues of Jain Wifehood, Oxford University Press, ISBN 978-0-19-973679-9
- Lockard, Craig A. (2007), Societies, Networks, and Transitions. Volume I: to 1500, Cengage Learning, ISBN 978-0618386123
- Kelting, Whitney (2006), "Thinking collectively about Jain Satis: The uses of Jain Sati name lists", in Peter Flügel (ed.), Studies in Jaina History and Culture: Disputes and Dialogues, Taylor & Francis, ISBN 978-0-203-00853-9
- Panicker, P.L. John (2006), Gandhi on Pluralism and Communalism, ISPCK, ISBN 9788172149055
- Qvarnström, Olle (2006), "The Jain-Mimamsa Debate on Omniscience", in Peter, Flügel (ed.), Studies in Jaina History and Culture: Disputes and Dialogues, pp. 89–106, doi:10.4324/9780203008539-6, ISBN 9780203008539
- Iyengar, Kodaganallur Ramaswami Srinivasa (2005), Asian Variations In Ramayana, Sahitya Akademi, ISBN 978-81-260-1809-3
- Sangave, Vilas Adinath (2001), Aspects of Jaina religion (3 ed.), Bharatiya Jnanpith, ISBN 978-81-263-0626-8
- Cort, John E. (2001), Jains in the World : Religious Values and Ideology in India: Religious Values and Ideology in India, Oxford University Press, ISBN 978-0-19-803037-9
- King, Richard (2001), Orientalism and Religion: Post-Colonial Theory, India and "The Mystic East", Taylor & Francis e-Library
- Schubring, Walther (2000), The Doctrine of the Jainas: Described After the Old Sources, Motilal Banarsidass, ISBN 978-81-208-0933-8
- Daniel, P.S. (2000), Hindu Response to Religious Pluralism, Kant Publications, ISBN 978-8186218105, archived from the original on 7 December 2013
- Jaini, Padmanabh S. (2000a), "Jaina Purana: A counter Puranic Tradition", Collected Papers on Jaina Studies, Motilal Banarsidass, ISBN 978-81-208-1691-6
- Jaini, Padmanabh S. (2000b), "Jina Rsabha as an Avatara of Visnu", Collected Papers on Jaina Studies, Motilal Banarsidass, ISBN 978-81-208-1691-6
- Glasenapp, Helmuth von (1999), Jainism: An Indian Religion of Salvation, Motilal Banarsidass, ISBN 978-81-208-1376-2
- Feynes, R.C.C (1998), The Lives of the Jain Elders, Oxford University Press, ISBN 978-0-19-283227-6
- Jaini, Padmanabh S. (1998), The Jaina Path of Purification, Motilal Banarsidass, ISBN 978-81-208-1578-0
- John E. Cort, ed. (1998), Open Boundaries: Jain Communities and Cultures in Indian History, SUNY Press, ISBN 978-0-7914-3785-8
- Babb, Lawrence A. (1996). Absent Lord: Ascetics and Kings in a Jain Ritual Culture. University of California Press. ISBN 978-0-520-91708-8.
- Rambachan, Anatanand (1994), The Limits of Scripture: Vivekananda's Reinterpretation of the Vedas, University of Hawaii Press
- Balbir, Nalini (1994), "Women in Jainism", in Sharma, Arvind (ed.), Religion and Women, SUNY Press, p. 121, ISBN 978-0-7914-1690-7
- Dundas, Paul (2002) [1992], The Jains (Second ed.), Routledge, ISBN 978-0-415-26605-5
- Ramanujan, A.K. (1991), "Three Hundred Ramayanas: Five Examples and Three Thoughts on Translation", in Paula Richman (ed.), Many Rāmāyaṇas: The Diversity of a Narrative Tradition in South Asia, University of California Press, ISBN 978-0-520-07589-4
- Zimmer, Heinrich (1989), Philosophies of India, Princeton University Press
- Embree, Ainslie T. (1988), Sources of Indian Tradition. Second Edition. volume One. From the beginning to 1800, Columbia University Press
- Zimmer, Heinrich (1953), Joseph Campbell (ed.), Philosophies Of India, London: Routledge & Kegan Paul Ltd, ISBN 978-8120807396
- Jain, Champat Rai (1929), Risabha Deva - The Founder of Jainism, Allahabad: The Indian Press Limited, "Not in Copyright"
