= Vishwa Jain Sangathan =

Religious and social service organization of Jains in India

- The symbol of Jainism, the Jain Prateek Chihna

- zone of influence
- Formation: 1 January 2005; 21 years ago
- Type: Jain religious organization
- Purpose: Religious, Political, Non Profit
- Headquarters: New Delhi India
- Region served: India
- Official language: Hindi and English
- Chairman: Sanjay Ji Jain
- National General Secretary: Sudeep Ji Jain
- Key people: Various Jains
- Main organ: Board of directors
- Affiliations: Various Jain organizations

Vishwa Jain Sangathan (VJS) is a religious and social service organization of Jains in India. Amongst other things, it was involved in the Jain minority campaign.

== History ==
The organization was founded in 2005 in Delhi. It organizes various conferences that revolve around Jain community issues.

== Issues ==
=== Jain minority ===
The organization has been involved in securing the status of an independent and minority religion for Jainism in India. It submitted a petition to the Delhi Government which played a part in Jains getting declared as a minority in Delhi. The organization has also presented memorandums to the Punjab Government for providing the status of a religious minority to Jains in Punjab.

The organization also stages protests and rallies to highlight their cause.

=== Lucknow idol desecration ===
VJS also actively protested the desecration of Mahavira's idol in Lucknow.

=== Others ===
The organization has also campaigned on a number of other issues, including the "Arihant Exports" name issue, Qutub Minar Jain museum, January 2013 attack on Muni Prabalsagar at Girnar etc.

== See also ==
- Legal status of Jainism as a distinct religion in India
