= History of Jainism =

Jainism is an ancient Indian religion belonging to the Śramaṇa tradition. Jains trace their history through a lineage of twenty-four tirthankaras (ford-makers), revering Rishabhanatha as the first in the present time-cycle. While tradition considers the dharma eternal, scholarly consensus places its verifiable historical roots in the 9th–8th century BCE, with the last two tirthankaras, Parshvanatha (c. 9th-8th c. BCE) and Mahāvīra (c. 6th c. BCE), widely accepted as historical figures. Mahāvīra is viewed by scholars not as a founder, but as a reformer of the pre-existing community established by Parshvanatha.

Following Mahāvīra's nirvana (c. 527 BCE, the start of the Vira Nirvana Samvat era), Jainism spread across India. Early epigraphic evidence, like the Hathigumpha inscription, attests to royal patronage under figures like King Kharavela of Kalinga (c. 2nd-1st c. BCE). Traditional accounts, primarily from the 12th-century Parishishtaparvan, describe Chandragupta Maurya embracing Jainism, while Mauryan emperors like Ashoka and Samprati are mentioned in edicts and Jain texts respectively. Archaeological finds at Kankali Tila (Mathura) confirm a thriving community with temples, stupas, and a sophisticated artistic tradition under the Kushanas (c. 1st-3rd c. CE), while inscriptions and temples at Udayagiri Caves (Madhya Pradesh) and Deogarh (Uttar Pradesh) show continued prosperity under the Guptas (c. 4th-6th c. CE).

The Classical Age (c. 7th–13th c. CE) saw significant patronage, particularly in the Deccan under dynasties like the Chalukyas, Rashtrakutas, and Western Gangas, leading to the creation of major literary works (Adi Purana) and monuments like the Gommateshwara statue at Shravanabelagola. In Western India, the Chaulukyas were notable patrons, supporting scholars like Hemachandra and ministers who built the Dilwara Temples. The gradual schism between the two main sects, Digambara and Śvētāmbara, likely began around the 1st century CE and was solidified by the 5th century CE, primarily over differences in ascetic practices (nudity) and scriptural authority.

From the 12th century onwards, Jainism faced challenges due to the rise of competing devotional movements like Lingayatism and persecution during Mughal Empire, leading to the destruction of some temples. However, the community showed resilience, adapting as mercantile classes and influencing rulers like Emperor Akbar, who, advised by the Śvetāmbara monk Hiravijaya, temporarily banned animal slaughter during Paryushana. The Modern Period saw interactions with colonial rule, academic recognition spurred by scholars like Hermann Jacobi, monastic revivals led by figures such as Acharya Shantisagar, and the emergence of reform movements.

== Foundations: The indigenous civilization (pre-history – 600 BCE) ==
=== The Magadhan context: A non-Vedic origin ===
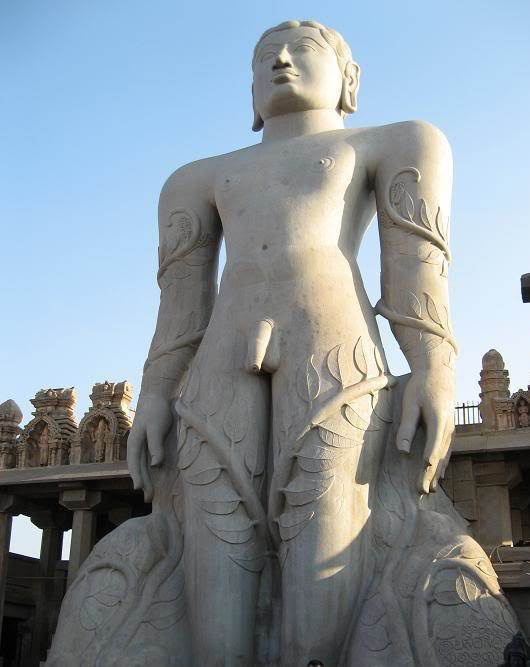
Bahubali, son of Rishabhanatha (first Jain tirthankara), practicing meditation in standing Kayotsarga posture. (Photo: Gommateshwara statue, Shravanbelagola)

Recent scholarship, notably by Indologists like Johannes Bronkhorst, situates the origins of Jainism within the cultural sphere of "Greater Magadha" (modern Bihar and eastern Uttar Pradesh), distinct from the Vedic culture of western India. In this region, concepts such as karma, rebirth (samsara), and ahimsa (non-violence) evolved as indigenous beliefs of the Śramaṇa (ascetic) movements before the arrival of Vedic Brahmanism. Unlike the Vedic tradition, which focused on sacrifices (yajna) to appease deities, the Śramaṇa traditions—including Jainism, Buddhism, and Ājīvika—emphasized individual effort, austerity (tapas), and the internal search for liberation (moksha).

The Atharvaveda (Book 15) describes a distinct group of ascetics known as the Vratyas, who existed on the fringes of Vedic society in the Magadha region. Unlike the Vedic priests, the Vratyas did not perform fire sacrifices (agnihotra) and traveled in groups. Scholars like Ramaprasad Chanda and D.R. Bhandarkar have identified the Vratyas as the proto-Jain or indigenous Śramaṇa lineage that predates Mahavira, the 24th tirthankara. The Vratyas are described as standing still for long periods in a posture resembling the Jain Kayotsarga (standing meditation), and their leader is referred to as the Ekavratya or Arhant, terms later central to Jain theology. Indologist J.C. Heesterman suggests that the Vratya tradition represents the 'pre-classical' roots of the renouncer movements, providing the cultural bridge between the earlier Indus Valley civilization and the later historical Jain sangha.

=== Proto-history and universal lineage ===
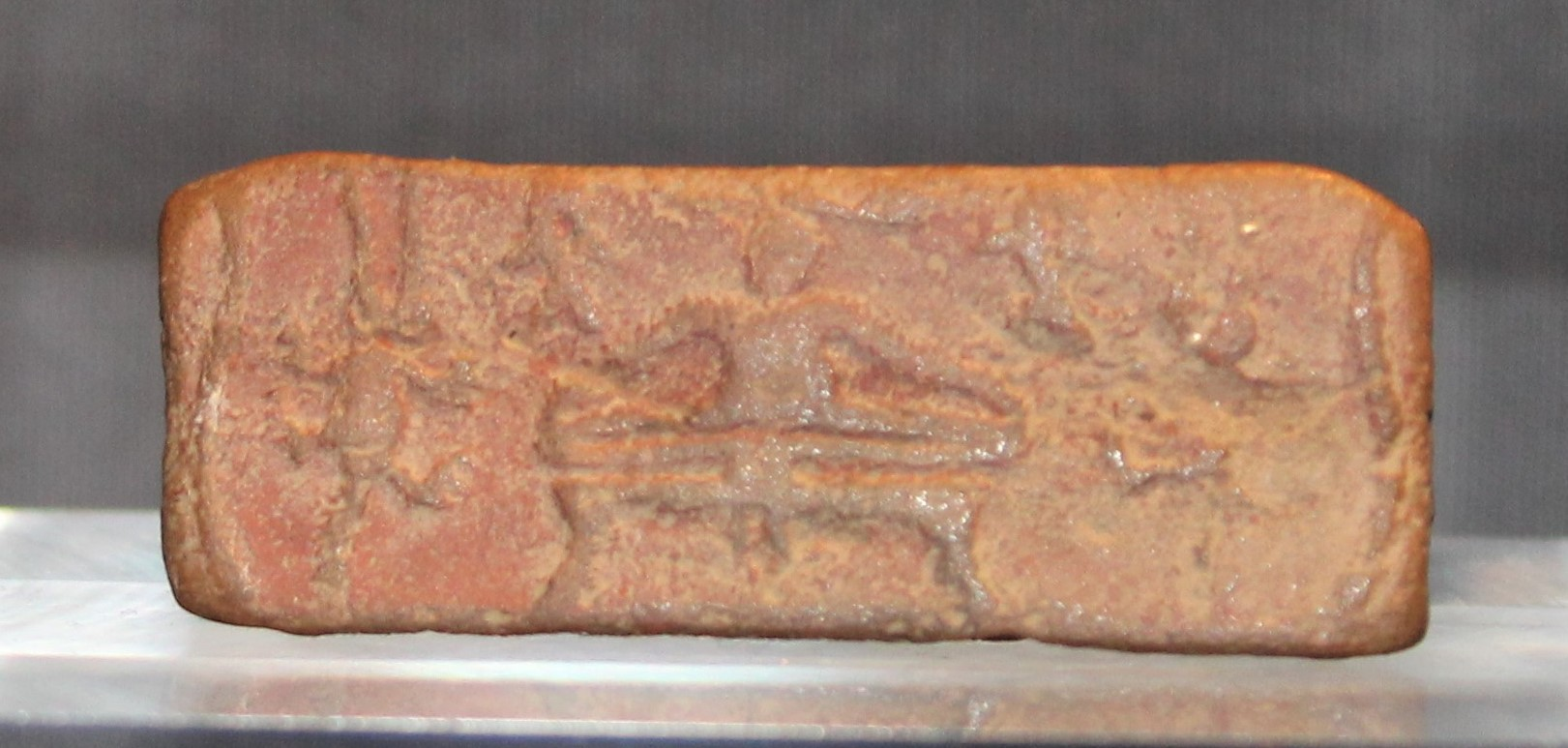
Triangular prism sealing from Indus Valley Civilisation, depicting a male cult figure seated in a yogic posture on a throne, a bull-like animal, and five characters in the Indus script. From Mohenjo-daro, Mature Harrapean period, c. 2600-1900 BC. Ashmolean Museum.

Jain tradition posits a lineage of 24 tirthankaras who guide humanity across cosmic time cycles. While scholarly consensus traces verifiable historical roots to the 9th–8th century BCE, the narratives of the earlier tirthankaras contain significant overlaps with Vedic and Epic literature, suggesting deep antiquity.

Some scholars hypothesize that Jain practices originated in the Indus Valley Civilisation (IVC), pointing to seals depicting figures in meditative postures resembling kayotsarga and bull motifs associated with Rishabhanatha, the first tirthankara. Rishabhanatha is also mentioned in the Rig Veda and Bhagavata Purana as an Avadhuta king, Rishabha, who renounced his kingdom. (Note: For example: ऋषभं मा समानानां सपत्नानां विषासहिम् । हन्तारं शत्रूणां कृधि विराजं गोपतिं गवाम् ॥१॥ – Rigveda 10.166.1 Other examples of Rishabha appearing in the Vedic literature include verses 6.16.47 of Rigveda, 9.4.14-15 of Atharvaveda, 3.7.5.13 and 4.7.10.1 of Taittiriya Brahmana, etc.)

The 20th tirthankara, Munisuvrata, is traditionally placed as a contemporary of Rama. Jain versions of the epic, such as the Paumacariya, depict the narrative through a Jain lens, emphasizing non-violence over martial valor.

The 22nd tirthankara, Neminatha, is traditionally linked as a cousin of Krishna, sharing the Yadava lineage of Saurashtra. Some historians connect him with "Ghora Angirasa", a teacher mentioned in the Chandogya Upanishad who taught Krishna the principle of ahimsa, suggesting a historical interaction between the Jain and Vedic traditions.

=== Parsvanatha: The historical "first" teacher ===
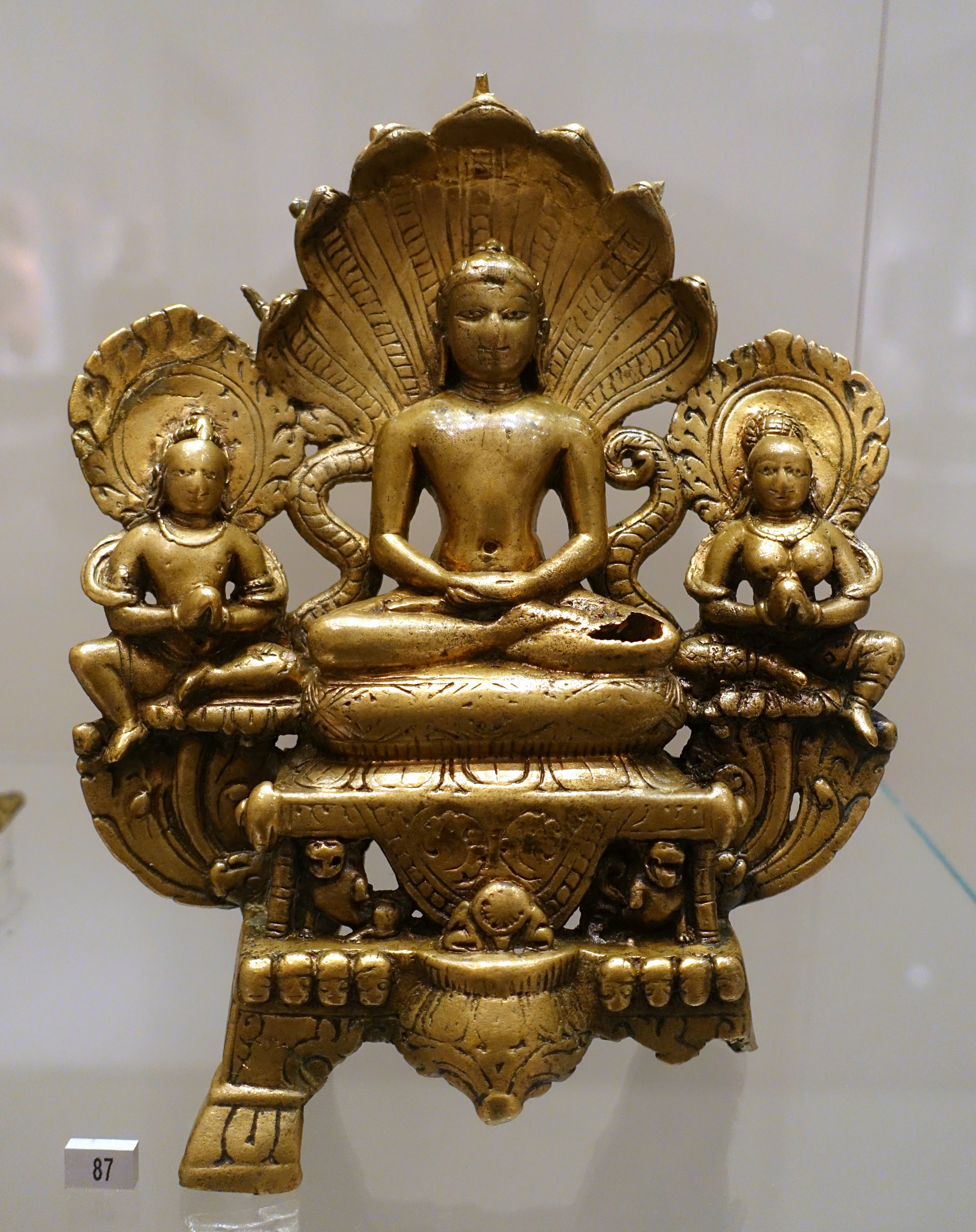
An 8th-century CE brass idol of Parshvanatha. It depicts the 23rd tirthankara, the earliest Jain leader accepted by scholars as a historical figure (c. 9th–8th century BCE), and illustrates the later artistic tradition associated with him.

Parshvanatha (c. 9th–8th century BCE), the 23rd tirthankara, is the earliest Jain leader widely accepted by scholars as a historical figure. Born in Varanasi, his historicity establishes Jainism as a distinct pre-Buddhist Śramaṇa tradition. Historical analysis suggests his teachings formed the basis for the Chaturyama Dharma (Four-fold Restraint): non-violence, truth, non-stealing, and non-possession. Traditional accounts place his liberation (moksha) atop Mount Sammeda (now Sammed Shikharji), which remains a site of paramount importance in Jain pilgrimage.

While specific events like the legendary obstruction by Kamath during meditation (traditionally associated with Ahichchhatra) are part of hagiography, the sites themselves gained historical significance. Ahichchhatra became a major Jain pilgrimage center with temples commemorating Parshvanatha.

Evidence for the continuity of his monastic order is suggested by Śvetāmbara texts, such as the Upkeśa Gaccha Pattavali (a monastic genealogy), which details a lineage of teachers that descended from him. (Note: After Parshvanatha attained liberation, his disciple Arya Subhadatta became the head of the monks. Arya Subhadatta was succeeded by Arya Haridatta, Arya Samudradatta, Kesi, Swayamprabhasuri, and Ratnaprabhasuri and so on. This monastic order was known as Upkeśa Gaccha. Uttaradhyayana, an ancient Svetambara text, has records of a dialogue between Mahavira's disciple Gautama Swami and Kesi; Kesi, along with monks of his monastic order, accepted Mahavira as a tirthankara and merged with his four-fold congregation as a result.)

== The Magadhan state and The Great Migration (600 BCE – 200 BCE) ==
=== Mahavira and the Buddhist relation ===
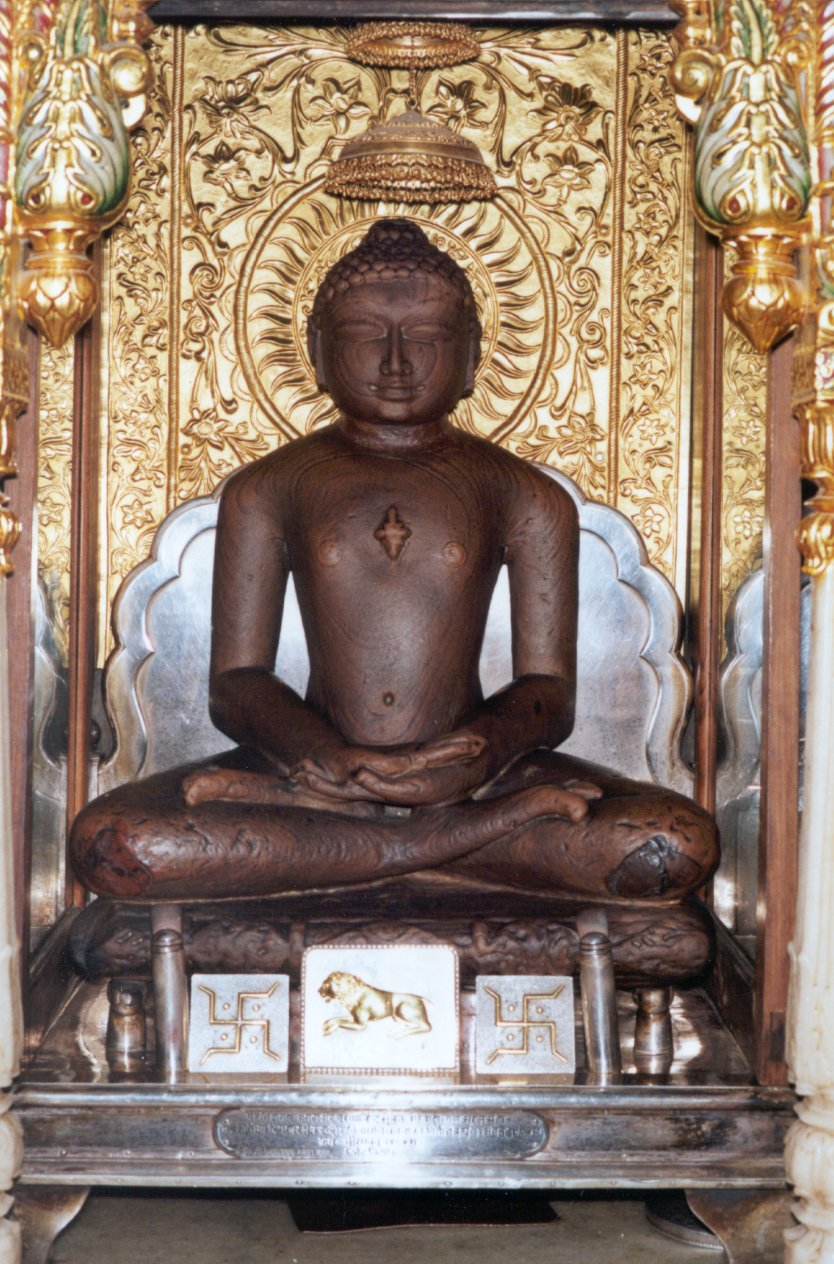
A modern depiction of Mahavira. As a contemporary of the Buddha, Mahavira is a key historical anchor, recognized by scholars as a reformer of the pre-existing Nigantha community.

Mahavira (c. 6th century BCE), the 24th tirthankara, is recognized by scholars as a reformer of the pre-existing community established by Parshvanatha rather than the founder of a new religion. Born in Kundagrama near Vaishali, he attained omniscience (Kevala Jnana) after 12 years of asceticism.

As a contemporary of Gautama Buddha, Mahavira's life provides a crucial anchor point for early Indian chronology. Early Buddhist texts frequently refer to him as Nigantha Nataputta ("The Bondless Son of the Nata Clan) and describe his followers, the Niganthas, as a significant, established ascetic community distinct from the Buddhists. (Note: The Buddha tried ascetic methods found in Jainism, abandoned that path and taught the Middle Way instead. The Buddha disagreed with the Mahavira's concept of soul or self (jiva). Similarly, he found the Jain theory of karma and rebirths incompatible and inflexible with his own ideas for these.) The two communities were prominent competitors for followers and patronage, particularly among the merchant (vaishya) groups. Mahavira also faced rivalry from Makkhali Gosala, the founder of the Ājīvika sect, who is described in Jain texts as an early companion of Mahavira before breaking away to preach fatalism. According to Svetambara, there were eight schisms (Nihvana) during the time of Mahavira. The primary archaeological evidence for the Ājīvikas is the Barabar Caves in Bihar. These are the oldest rock-cut caves in India, dedicated by Emperor Ashoka in the 3rd century BCE. Their austere design provided a model for later Jain and Buddhist rock-cut monasteries.

At age 30, he renounced worldly life and undertook intense ascetic practices for over 12 years before attaining omniscience (Kevala Jnana). For the next 30 years, he traveled extensively through the Ganges basin, teaching the path to liberation. His liberation (moksha) is traditionally held to have occurred at Pawapuri (also in Bihar), an event marking the beginning of the Jain Vira Nirvana Samvat calendar era. The night of his nirvana are commemorated by Jains as Diwali at the same time that Hindus celebrate it.

His chief disciple, Indrabhuti Gautama, is said to have attained omniscience the night that Mahavira achieved nirvana from Pawapuri. Following Mahavira's death, leadership of the Jain community passed to his ganadhara (chief disciple) Sudharmaswami (d. 600 BCE). He is traditionally regarded as the head of the sangha from whom the entire historical monastic lineage is traced. He was succeeded by Jambuswami (d. 463 BCE) who is regarded as the last omniscient being by Jain traditions. Traditional Jain accounts also name early kings of the Haryanka dynasty, such as Bimbisara, Ajatashatru and Udayin, as patrons, though external historical verification for this varies.

=== Archaeological origins: The Lohanipur Torso and Barli ===
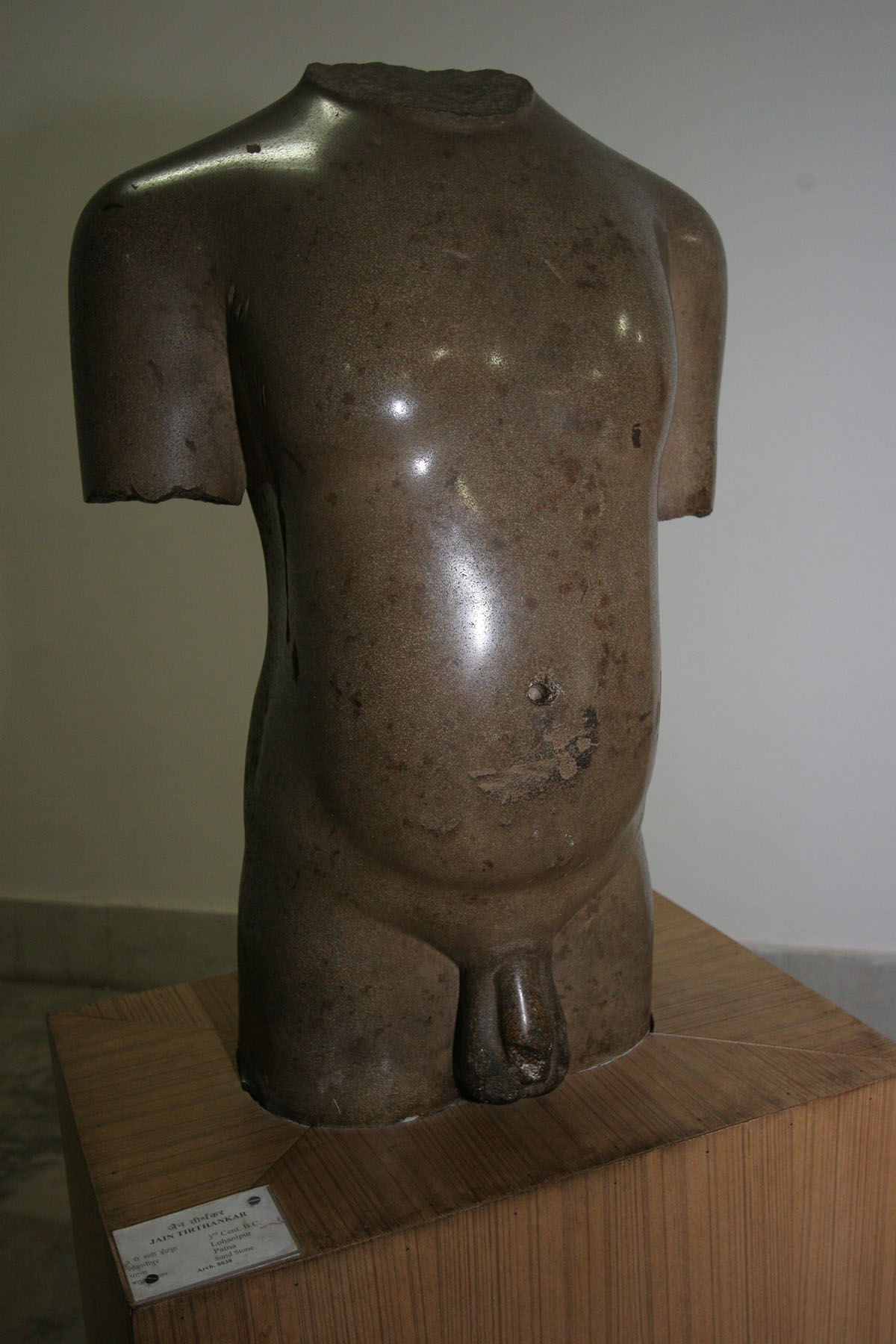
Lohanipur torso, Patna Museum

The earliest potential Jain monumental sculpture is the Lohanipur Torso, a highly polished, naked male torso discovered near Patna, Bihar. Its distinctive polish dates it to the Mauryan era (c. 3rd c. BCE). The statue's nudity and stiff Kayotsarga meditation pose are cited by Digambara scholars as early evidence of the Mula Sangh (original naked order) existing in Magadha before any schism. Epigraphic evidence also appears early in Rajasthan. The Barli Inscription, discovered in 1912 and dated to the 2nd or 1st century BCE, is interpreted by some scholars as a Jain dedication, marking the religion's early spread into western India.

=== The Great Migration (The Sectarian Divide) ===
A pivotal, albeit debated, event in Jain history is the Great Migration to the South. According to Digambara tradition, the monk Bhadrabahu (d. 298 BCE) predicted a 12-year famine in Magadha. To preserve the strict rules of the Jina Kalpa (which included nudity and specific eating rituals), he led a group of 12,000 monks south to Shravanabelagola (Karnataka). Tradition holds that Chandragupta Maurya (c. 322–298 BCE), the founder of the Mauryan Empire, abdicated his throne, joined Bhadrabahu as a monk, and ended his life through Sallekhana (ritual fasting to death) on Chandragiri Hill. Later inscriptions at Shravanabelagola (dating from 600 CE onwards) strongly commemorate this event as the foundation of the southern Jain community. The monks who stayed behind in Magadha during the famine were forced to relax their vows (such as wearing white cloth) to survive, leading to the Śvetāmbara deviation.

Śvetāmbara reject the specific Bhadrabahu-Chandragupta migration narrative as inauthentic or a later fabrication. They maintain that the schism was a gradual process caused by doctrinal differences later in the timeline. Some scholars specifically state that the said lore was developed after 600 CE and is inauthentic.

The edicts of Chandragupta's grandson, Ashoka (c. 273–232 BCE), mention the Niganthas (Jains) when detailing the duties of his law-authorities (dhammamahatma), confirming they were a well-established community. Ashoka's grandson, Samprati (c. 224–215 BCE), is described in Śvetāmbara canonical scriptures as a major patron, or "Jain Ashoka," who was converted by the monk Suhastin and built thousands of Jain temples from his capital in Ujjain.

The traditional narratives, while not considered the historical cause by most modern scholars, are foundational to each sect's identity and explain their interpretation of the split.

- Digambara Narrative: Recorded in later hagiographies around the 10th century CE, this account places the split in the 4th century BCE. It states that Acharya Bhadrabahu predicted a famine in Magadha and led a migration of monks to the South. The monks who remained, led by Sthulabhadra, adopted the "heretical" practice of wearing robes. The monks who returned from the south, having preserved the original practice of nudity, became the Digambaras.
- Śvetāmbara Narrative: Recorded in earlier texts like the 5th-century Avashyak Bhashya, this account claims the sangha was unified until 82 CE. It states a monk named Sivabhuti, in an act of pride, rejected his robes and began teaching the "false doctrine" of obligatory nudity, thereby founding the Digambara line.

=== Western interactions: The Gymnosophists ===
The Gymnosophists Greek accounts from the campaign of Alexander the Great (326 BCE) provide the earliest Western descriptions of Jain ascetics, whom they termed Gymnosophists ("Naked Philosophers"). The Greeks encountered a group of these ascetics in Taxila led by a sage named Dandamis (or Mandanis). While Dandamis famously refused to meet Alexander, asserting his spiritual independence from any temporal conqueror, his disciple Kalanos agreed to accompany the Macedonian army to Persia. While some scholars debate their sectarian identity, their strict adherence to nudity and public penance align with the Digambara monastic code. Kalanos later taught Alexander the philosophy of detachment before voluntarily ending his life by immolation at Susa, an event that deeply impacted Greek Stoic philosophy.

== The age of assertion: Art, war and schism (200 BCE – 200 CE) ==
=== Royal Patronage in the East: King Kharavela and Hathigumpha Inscription ===
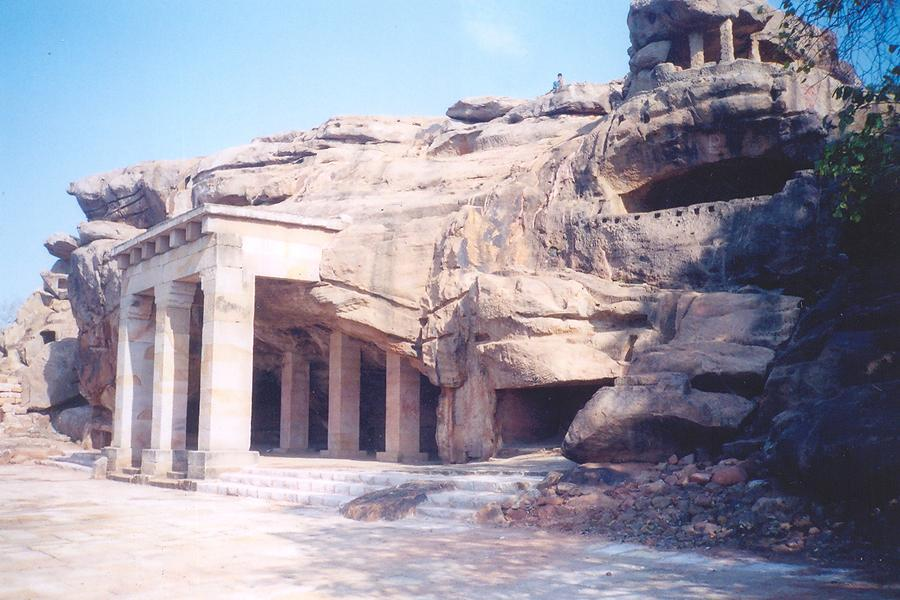
Entrance of the Hathigumpha monument. The pillared front, steps and other structures were added in 19th and 20th centuries to help conserve the monument.

The most definitive epigraphic evidence of early royal patronage comes from the Hathigumpha inscription at Udayagiri and Khandagiri Caves in Odisha. Dated to the 2nd or 1st century BCE, it details the reign of Emperor Kharavela of the Mahameghavahana dynasty. The inscription notably begins with a variation of the Navkar Mantra and records Kharavela recovering a "Kalinga Jina" idol that had been taken by the Nanda dynasty, suggesting Jainism was established in Kalinga as early as the 4th century BCE. The site contains extensive rock-cut monasteries (gumphas) including the two-storied Ranigumpha (Queen's Cave), proving that Jainism flourished under state patronage outside the Mauryan sphere.

In Odisha, Jainism continued to flourish after the Kharavela era, particularly under the Murunda dynasty and later local rulers. Archaeological evidence includes the later medieval caves at Khandagiri (Cuttack district) and the Jain temple complexes at Subai (Koraput district).

=== The Mathura School: Kankali Tila ===
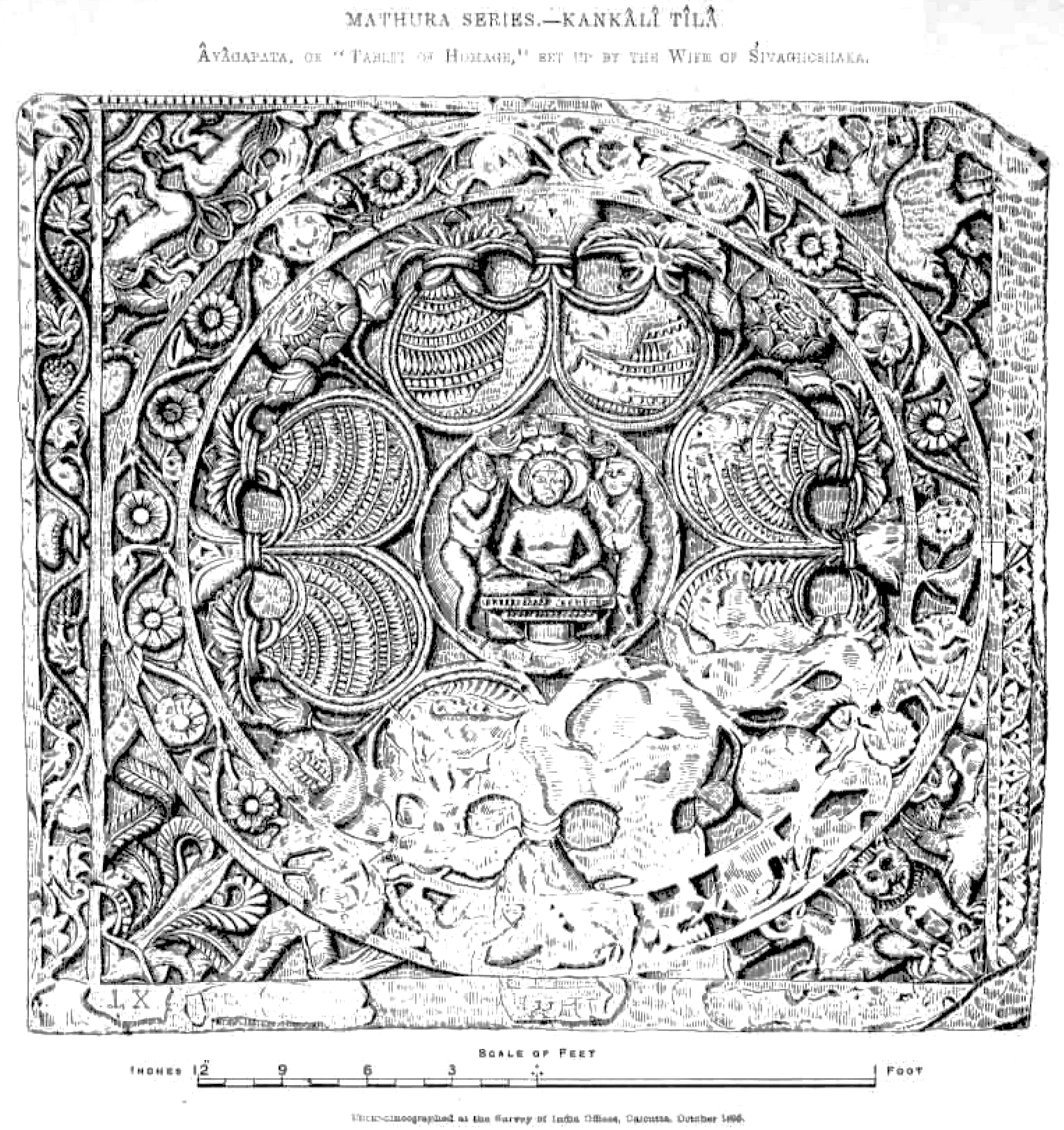
An ayagapata (tablet of homage) depicting Parshvanatha, c. 15 CE, found at Kankali Tila, Mathura. Such tablets, often featuring tirthankaras or stupas, were common votive offerings during the Kushan period.

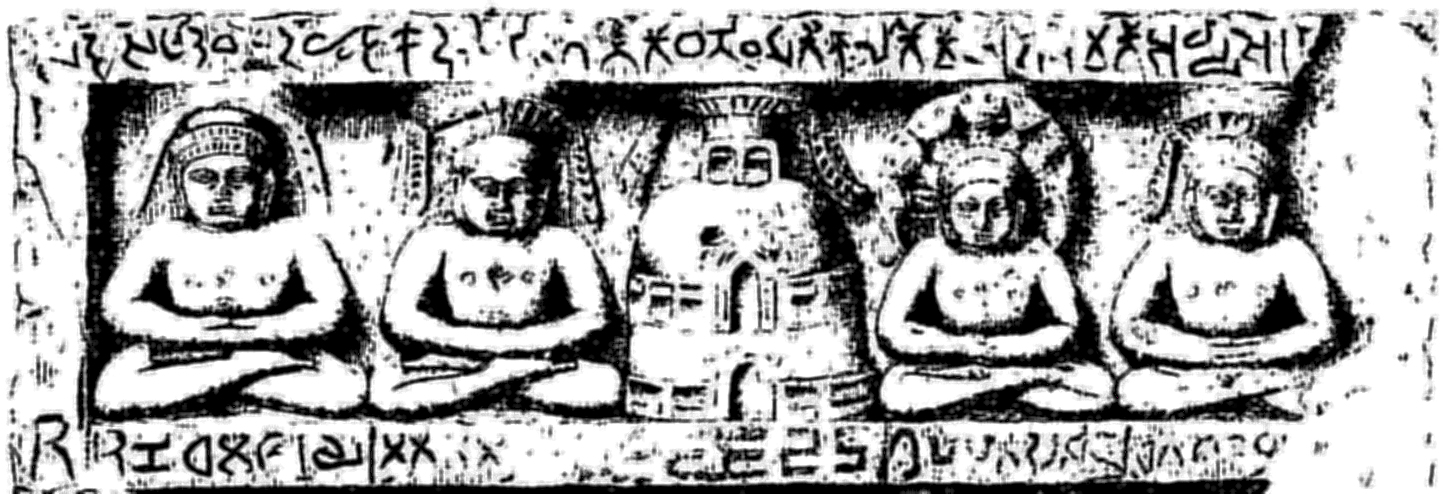
A Kushan-era sculpture (c. 51 CE) from Kankali Tila depicting the last four tirthankaras. The detailed iconography and dated inscriptions found at Mathura demonstrate the standardization and flourishing of Jain art under the Kushanas.

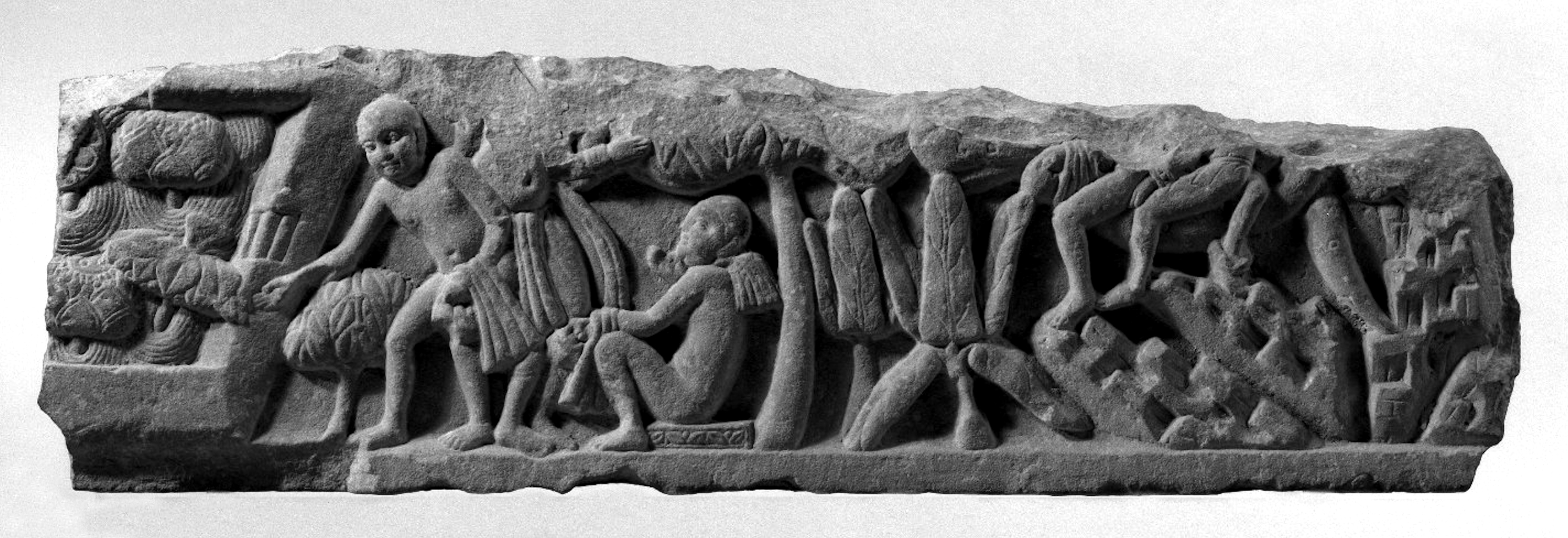
A 1st- to 2nd–century CE water tank relief panel showing two ardhaphalaka Jain monks carrying colapatta cloth on their left hand found in the ruins of Mathura (Brooklyn Museum 87.188.5). This cloth carrying tradition to cover genitalia by ancient Jain monks in principle resembles the beliefs of the Śvetāmbara.

The most extensive archaeological evidence for early Jainism comes from Kankali Tila in Mathura (Uttar Pradesh). Excavations here have revealed a thriving community from the 2nd century BCE to the Kushan period (c. 1st–3rd c. CE).

Unlike modern Jainism, early devotees at Mathura built Stupas (relic mounds) and worshipped Ayagapatas (votive tablets). Tablets like the Parsvanatha Ayagapata (c. 15 CE) show the transition from symbol worship to image worship. The vast majority of tirthankara images found at Mathura are nude, which Digambaras cite as archaeological proof that the original Jain tradition was "sky-clad" (Digambara).

However, some relief panels also depict monks holding a small piece of cloth (ardhaphalaka) to cover their privates. Scholars often interpret the ardhaphalaka monks as a "proto-Śvetāmbara" stage or a transitional sect. Digambara tradition views them either as Kshullakas (junior monks who wear two cloths) or as members of the Yapaniya sect, a now-extinct group that practiced nudity but held Śvetāmbara-like doctrinal views.

== The age of logic and the early south (200 CE – 600 CE) ==
Following the formative era, Jainism entered a "Golden Age" of intellectual development and geographical consolidation. This period was defined by the transition from Prakrit to Sanskrit, the systematization of Jain logic to survive inter-religious debates, and the establishment of regional "subsidiaries" to localize the faith in South India.

=== Epigraphic spread: South and West ===
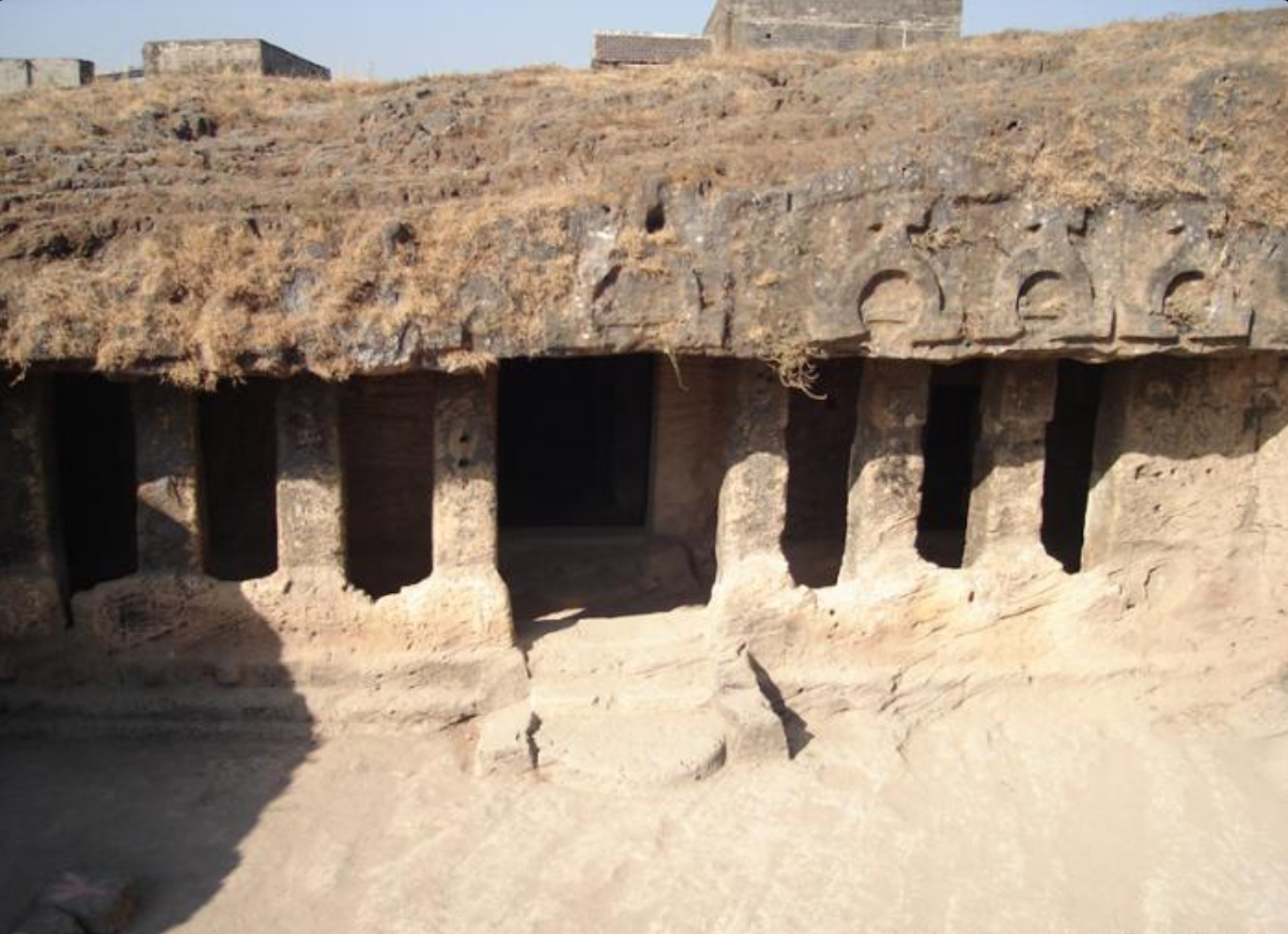
Bava Pyara caves near Junagadh, Gujarat

Epigraphic evidence confirms the traditional narrative of Jainism's spread beyond Magadha.

The Pugalur inscriptions (c. 2nd c. CE) near Karur, Tamil Nadu, record the construction of a rock shelter for a Jain monk by a Chera king. Other Tamil-Brahmi inscriptions at sites like Edakkal Caves (c. 3rd c. CE) and Arachalur Musical Inscription (c. 2nd c. CE) attest to a thriving ascetic culture in the Tamil region.

Jain tradition, particularly the Kalakacharya Katha (legends likely compiled 4th-10th c. CE), describes interactions with Saka (Indo-Scythian) rulers. (Note: The narrative tells of the Jain monk Kalaka seeking Saka help against King Gardabhilla of Ujjain (c. 1st c. BCE), who had abducted Kalaka's sister, a nun. The Sakas are depicted defeating Gardabhilla and establishing rule, initially revering Kalaka.) Archaeological confirmation comes from the Bava Pyara caves and Talaja Caves in Gujarat (c. 1st–4th c. CE), which show clear evidence of Jain occupation during the Saka-Kshatrapa period. King Salivahana (late 1st century CE), associated with conflicts against the Sakas, is also mentioned in Jain legends as a patron, though this is historically uncertain.

The Son Bhandar Caves in Rajgir contain inscriptions from the 3rd–4th century CE by Muni Vairadeva, confirming the site remained a center for ascetics well into the Gupta period.

=== The philosophical synthesis ===
This era produced the "Great Acharyas" whose works defined Jain metaphysics and logic, transitioning the tradition from Prakrit to Sanskrit.

Umaswati (c. 2nd–5th century CE) authored the Tattvartha Sutra ("Manifesto on the Nature of Reality"). It systematized Jain ontology and remains the only text accepted as authoritative by both the Digambara and Śvetāmbara traditions.

Samantabhadra (c. 150–250 CE), a Digambara pontiff from the Tamil region during the time of the Cholas, was a poet, logician, and eulogist credited with spreading Jainism in the south. His work Aptamimamsa defended the rationality of the tirthankaras' omniscience.

Siddhasena Divakara (c. 5th century CE) formalized the rules of inference in his Nyayavatara, equipping Jain monks to debate Buddhist logicians.

=== The Great Schism: codification of canons ===
The divergence between the sects was institutionalized during this period through conflicting councils and literary formalization.

Fearing the loss of oral agamas, the Śvetāmbara tradition convened the Second Council of Valabhi (c. 453 or 466 CE) in Gujarat under the patronage of the Maitraka dynasty king Dhruvasena I. Presided over by Devardhigani Kshamashramana, this council committed the canon to writing.

Rejecting the Valabhi canon, the Digambara tradition relies on the Shatkhandagama. According to tradition, the monk Dharasena (c. 2nd century CE) summoned monks Pushpadanta and Bhutabali to his cave in Mount Girnar to transmit the remaining fragments of oral knowledge, which they compiled into sutra form.

The split crystallized over five key disagreements: Nudity, the Liberation of Women (Stri-mukti), the Food of the Kevalin, Scripture, and Iconography. A later text summarizing these differences, the Chaurasi Bol, was composed by Hemraj Pande in 1652.

=== Metaphysics and the "bridge" sects ===
As the schism hardened, distinct intellectual identities emerged.

Acharya Kundakunda (dates vary, c. 2nd–8th century CE) defined the sect's identity through works like the Samayasara, emphasizing the absolute standpoint (nischaya naya) of the soul's purity. This lineage was expanded by Pujyapada (c. 5th–6th century CE), a grammarian and philosopher.

A third major sect, the Yapaniya, flourished in the Deccan (Karnataka) from the 5th to the 14th century. Inscriptions from the Kadamba dynasty (c. 4th–6th century CE) at sites like Halasi confirm royal grants to this order. They practiced nudity but accepted Śvetāmbara scriptures and advocated for the spiritual liberation of women. They eventually merged into the Digambara tradition, leaving a legacy visible in the specific rituals of Karnataka's Jain temples today.

=== Material culture: art and temples ===
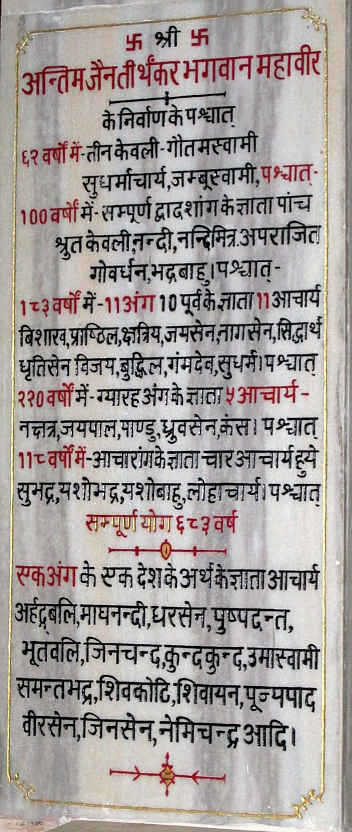
Stela: Bhadrabahu as the last Kevalin in Digambara tradition

Jainism received significant patronage during the Gupta Empire (c. 4th-6th c. CE), evidenced by a 425 CE inscription at Udayagiri Caves (Madhya Pradesh) recording the installation of a Parsvanatha statue during Kumaragupta I's reign.

The Chausa Hoard (Bihar, c. 1st–3rd century CE) represents the earliest Jain bronzes. By the 5th century, the Akota Hoard (Gujarat) displays distinct Śvetāmbara iconography (clothed tirthankaras).

In Western India, early rock-cut activity is evident at the Dhank Caves in Gujarat (c. 4th–7th century CE). The earliest structural temple complexes appear at Deogarh (Uttar Pradesh) in the 6th century.

== The imperial zenith and Bhakti Conflict (600 CE – 1000 CE) ==
The period between the 8th and 13th centuries marked the zenith of Jain institutional power. No longer just a community of wandering ascetics, Jainism became a religion of royal ministers, colossal monuments, and complex rituals. This era saw the rise of the great temple complexes and the integration of "Tantric" elements to compete with medieval Hinduism.

Jainism co-existed with Buddhism and Hinduism in ancient and medieval India. Many of its historic temples were built near Buddhist and Hindu temples in the 1st millennium CE. The Jain and Hindu communities have often been very close and mutually accepting. Some Hindu temples have included a Jain Tirthankara within its premises in a place of honour. Similarly numerous temple complexes feature both Hindu and Jain monuments, with Badami cave temples and Khajuraho among some of the most well known.

Evidence for a widespread Jain community is also found in material culture, such as the Hansi hoard (Haryana, c. 8th-9th c. CE), which contained numerous Jain bronze images.

During the subsequent Gurjara-Pratihara period (c. 8th–11th century CE), Jainism became deeply embedded in the mercantile ethos of Rajasthan. Towns such as Osian became major centers, with the famous Mahavira Temple (built by the Pratihara king Vatsaraja in 783 CE) serving as the cradle of the Oswal merchant community. Archaeological evidence from this era, including the Vasantgarh Hoard (687 CE) and the Hansi Hoard, demonstrates that Jain merchant guilds possessed significant wealth and political influence in the Pratihara feudal structure long before the rise of the Chaulukya dynasty (c. 950–1300 CE).

=== The Digambara South: Rashtrakutas and Gangas ===
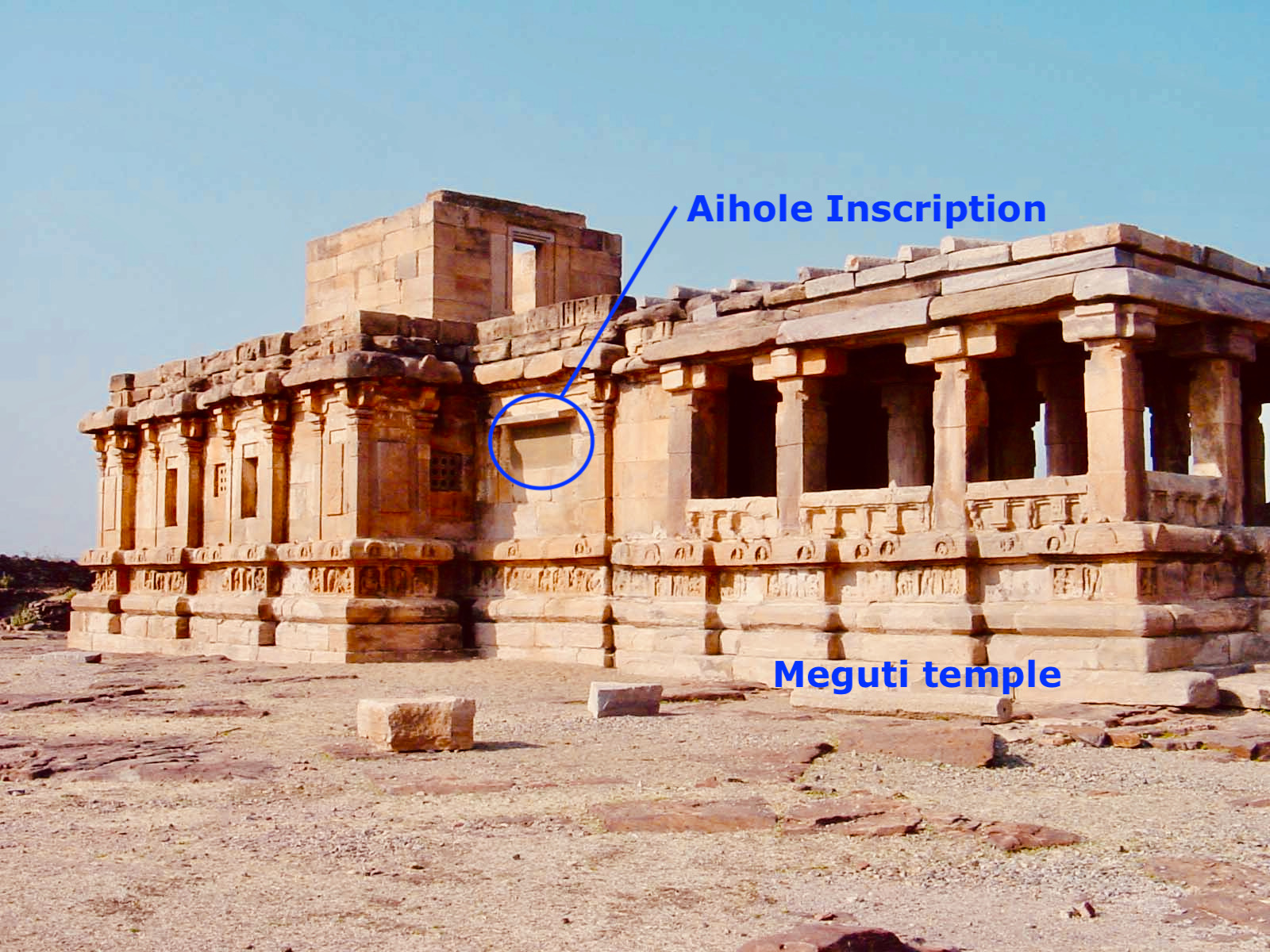
634 CE Aihole inscription by Ravikirti, Meguti Jain temple

Early Western Chalukya patronage is exemplified by the Meguti Jain temple at Aihole (7th c.), whose inscription was composed by the Jain poet Ravikirti in honor of Pulakeshin II. Further Chalukya patronage led to the dedication of Badami cave temple 4, the earliest major Jain rock-cut temple in the Deccan, around the 7th century.

Rashtrakuta dynasty (c. 8th-10th c.) presided over a golden age for Deccan Jainism. Many rulers were inclined towards Jainism, supporting scholars like Virasena and Jinasena (authors of the Dhavala and Adipurana respectively) and mathematicians like Mahaviracharya. King Amoghavarsha I was particularly noted for his Jain leanings. Kumudendu Muni, in his writing Siribhoovalaya, claims to be the spirititual teacher of Amoghavarsha and Shivamara II. This patronage culminated architecturally in the excavation of the elaborate Jain caves (Caves 30-34) at the UNESCO site of Ellora, including the famous Indra Sabha. This pattern of adding new Jain excavations to older religious sites is also seen at the Nasik Caves, where new Jain caves were excavated under Rashtrakuta patronage in the 9th century. The Dharashiv Caves in Maharashtra also belong to this period of Rashtrakuta influence.

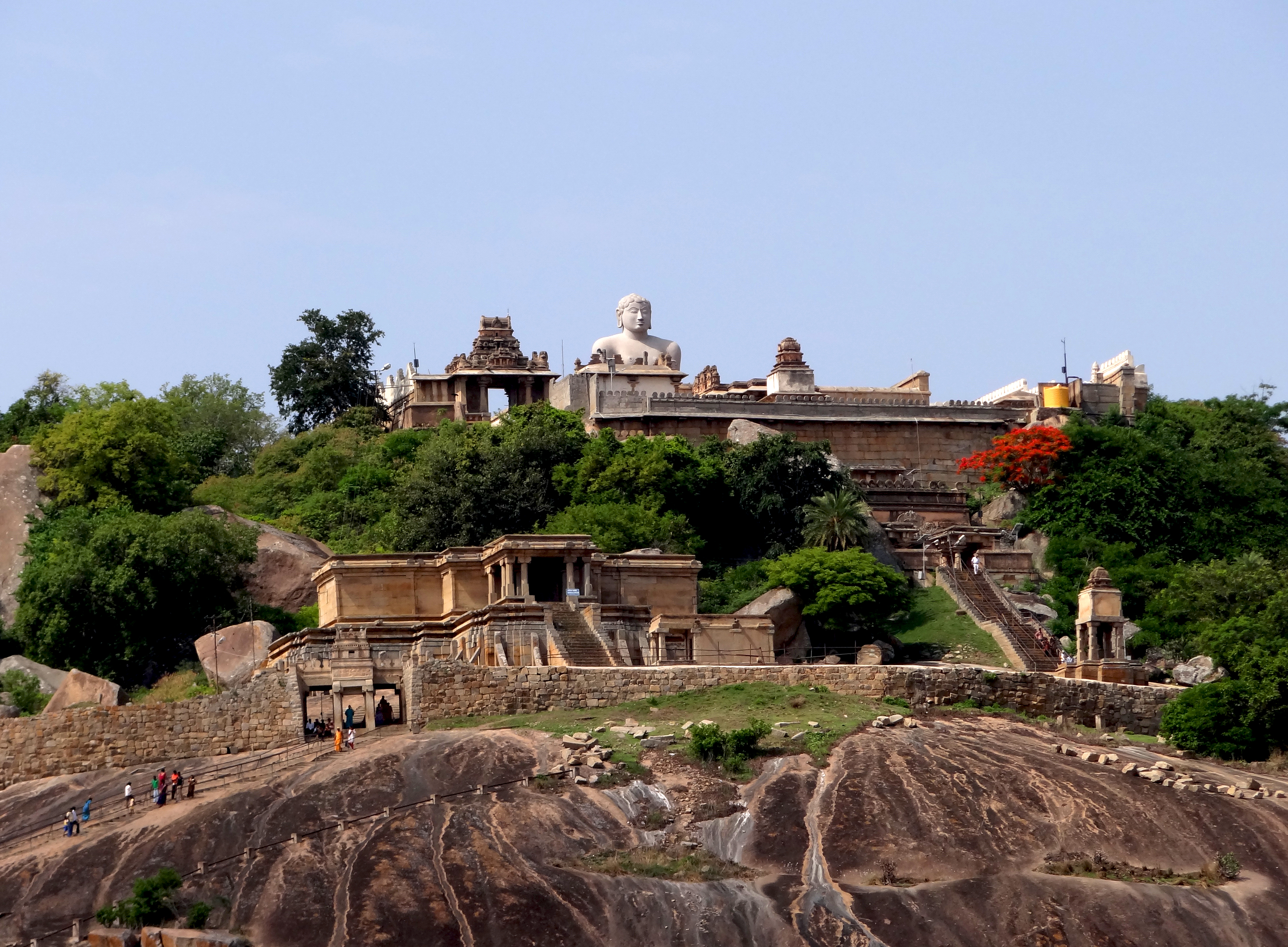
The Gommateshwara statue dated 978–993 on Vindhyagiri Hill

Loyal feudatories of the Rashtrakutas, the Western Gangas were staunch patrons, particularly evident in the construction of monuments at Shravanabelagola and Kambadahalli. Minister Chavundaraya commissioned the colossal Gommateshwara statue (consecrated 981 CE). The earlier ruler Shivamara I also built numerous basadis.

In the Andhra region, sites like the Undavalli Caves show a complex history, with scholars suggesting an early Jain or Buddhist foundation (c. 4th-5th c. CE) before their later conversion to Hindu use.

=== Flourishing in Southern and Western India ===
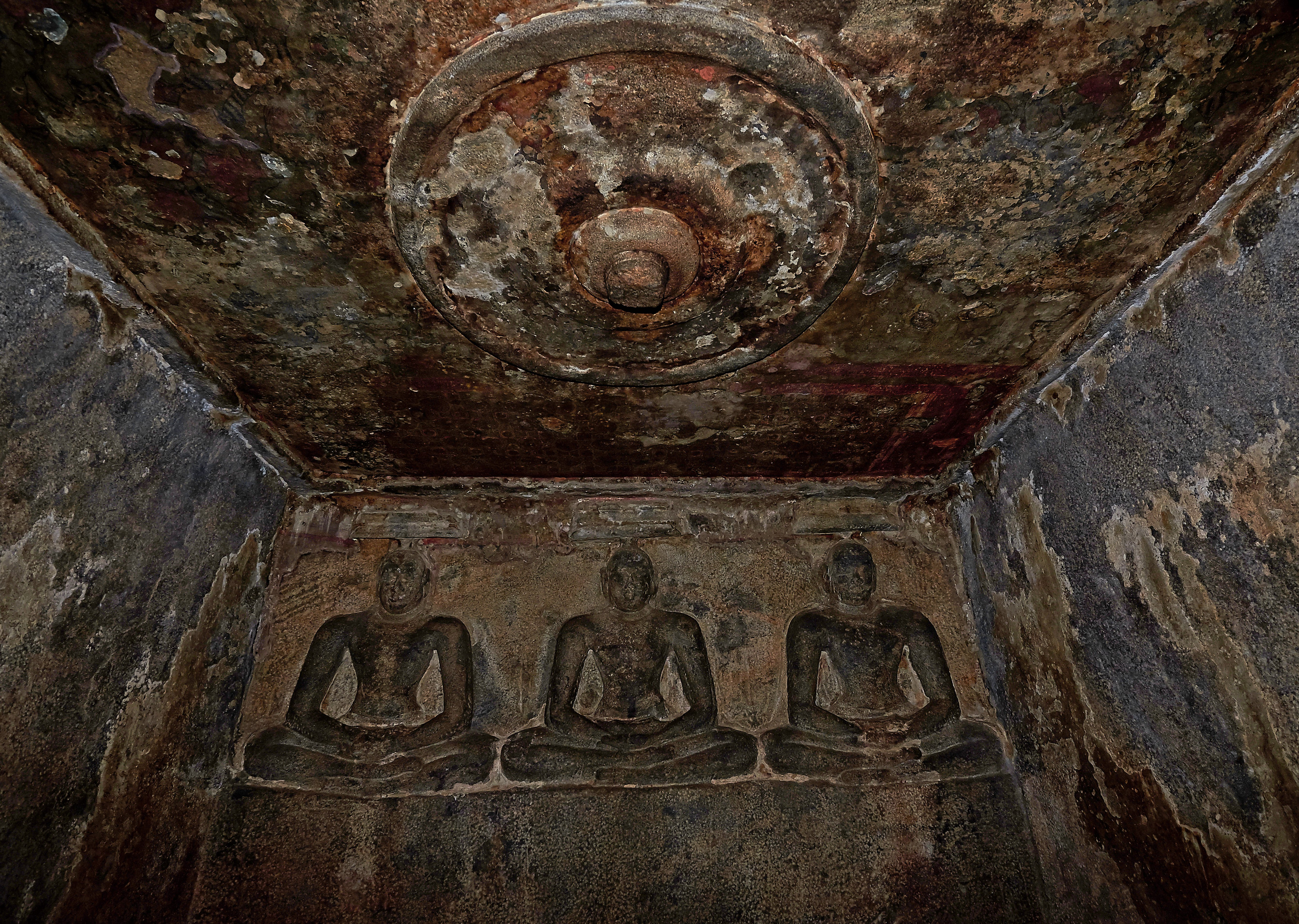
Tirthanakara images on walls of Sittanavasal Cave

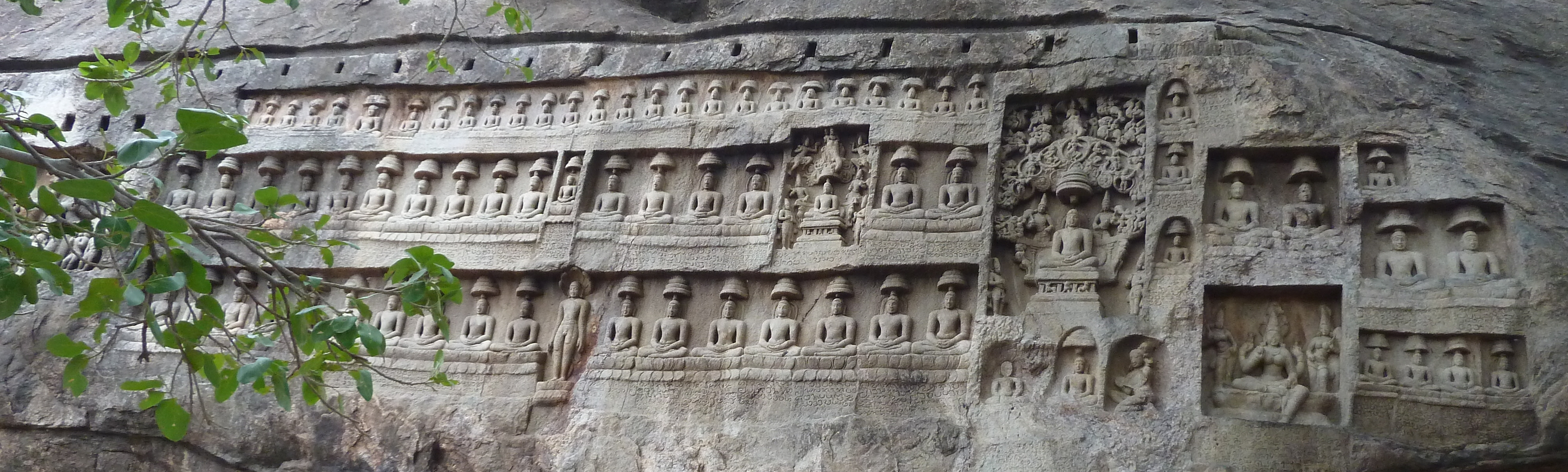
Kalugumalai Jain Beds

Further south, Jainism flourished under Pandya patronage around the 8th-9th centuries in Tamil Nadu. This era saw the creation of the renowned Jain murals at Sittanavasal Cave, the extensive rock-cut reliefs at Kalugumalai, the numerous inscriptions and reliefs at Samanar Hills near Madurai, and the Jain temple and paintings at Armamalai Cave. Later sites like Thirakoil (c. 8th c.) and Tirumalai demonstrate continuity with Chola-era paintings and large sculptures.

This architectural development was accompanied by other forms of material culture. The Akota and Vasantgarh bronze hoards, with images dating from the 5th to 11th centuries, demonstrate a continuous tradition of metal casting. Furthermore, the shastra bhandars (libraries) of Gujarat from this period preserved the earliest surviving examples of illuminated Jain palm-leaf manuscripts, which are a primary source for the Svetambara textual and artistic tradition.

=== Ritual transformation: Tantra and Goddesses ===
Between the 6th and 10th centuries, Jainism underwent a significant ritual transformation to compete with the rising popularity of Shaiva and Buddhist esoteric traditions. While retaining the core vegetarian ethos, Jain monks incorporated Mantra-vada (the path of spells) and Yantra rituals, fundamentally altering the lay practice.

This period saw the elevation of Sasanadevis (Guardian Goddesses) such as Padmāvatī, Ambika, and Jwalamalini. The Digambara text Jvalamalini-kalpa, composed by Indranandi in 939 CE under Rashtrakuta patronage, codified rituals for worldly goals—such as subduing rivals and curing disease. Later, the Svetambara text Bhairava-Padmavati-Kalpa (c. 11th century) further systematized the worship of Padmavati, blending Jain ethics with Tantric methodology. Historian Paul Dundas notes that this Tantricization provided a necessary "spiritual safety valve," allowing the lay community to seek worldly protection within the Jain fold rather than converting to other faiths.

=== The Vedantic Revival and Philosophical Competition ===
According to Jain texts, some of the Hindu gods are blood relatives of legendary tirthankara. Neminatha, the 22nd tirthankara for example is a cousin of Krishna in Jain Puranas and other texts. However, Jain scholars such as Haribhadra also wrote satires about Hindu gods, mocking them with novel outrageous stories where the gods misbehave and act unethically. The Hindu gods are recorded by some Jain writers as persecuting, tempting, afraid of, or serving a legendary Jina before he gains omniscience. In other stories, the Hindu deities such as Vishnu, or Rama and Sita come to pay respect to a Jina at a major Jain pilgrimage site such as Mount Satrunjaya and Mount Sammed Shikhar Ji. The languid Hindu scholars rewrote the original pre historic stories into their Hindu versions. According to Paul Dundas, these satires were aimed at the Hindu lay householder community, were means to inculcate piety and subvert the actual religious teachings offered by their Jain neighbors. True to their origins, Buddhist and Hindu scholars engaged in creating similar satire, mythology and parody-filled fiction targeting the Jains and each other. The emergence of major philosophical ideas within Hinduism impacted Jainism. According to a 1925 publication by von Glasenapp, around the 8th century CE, Adi Shankara brought forward the doctrine of Advaita, and either converted Jain temples to Hindu ones or completely destroyed them. The traditions of Vaishnavism and Shaivism also began to emerge. This, states von Glasenapp, contributed to a decline of "Jaina church", particularly in South India.

== The merchant-state and Marble Age (1000 CE – 1300 CE) ==
=== The rise of guilds and western dominance ===
The rapid expansion of Jainism during the Classical Age was driven by a symbiotic relationship between the monastic community (Sangha) and powerful merchant guilds (Srenis). In Western and Southern India, Jain merchants came to dominate trans-regional trade networks, such as the Vira Banaju and Nanadesi guilds. Epigraphic evidence reveals that these guilds frequently levied voluntary taxes (cess) on goods—such as betel leaves, textiles, and precious stones—specifically to fund temple construction and monastic libraries (Bhandaras).

This economic autonomy translated into immense political leverage, giving rise to the era of the "Merchant-Ministers" (Mantris). The most prominent examples were the brothers Vastupala and Tejapala (ministers to the Vaghela court) and the 13th-century shipping magnate Jagadu Shah. These figures utilized their personal wealth to finance state defenses and public works, effectively establishing Jainism as a state-protected religion without needing a Jain monarch on the throne. Historian Kanakalatha Mukund notes that this 'Temple Economy' allowed Jain institutions to act as stabilizing financial hubs during feudal conflicts.

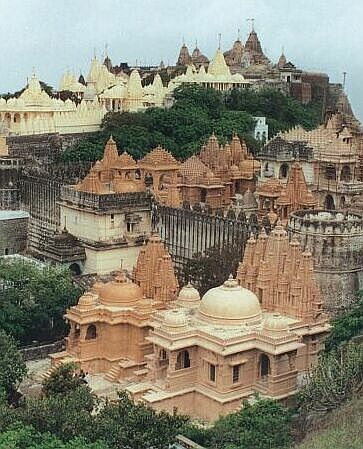
Jain temples on Shatrunjaya hill near Palitana, Gujarat

In Gujarat and Rajasthan, this mercantile patronage fueled the "Marble Age," a period characterized by Maru-Gurjara architecture noted for its intricate carving. The Dilwara Temples at Mount Abu stand as the primary legacy of this era; the complex includes the Vimal Vasahi temple (c. 1031 CE) commissioned by Minister Vimala Shah, and the Luna Vasahi temple (c. 1230 CE) built by Vastupala and Tejapala. Further consolidating this religious infrastructure, the Chaulukya dynasty oversaw the transformation of the Shatrunjaya hill at Palitana into a massive "city of temples" and the expansion of the ancient site of Girnar, solidifying the region's status as a primary pilgrimage network (tirtha). This had been noted by the 7th-century Chinese traveler Xuanzang.

Other dynasties in the region, such as the Shilahara dynasty (c. 8th–13th century) which ruled the Konkan coast, also served as key patrons, funding temples throughout Maharashtra.

=== Influence in Central and Eastern India ===
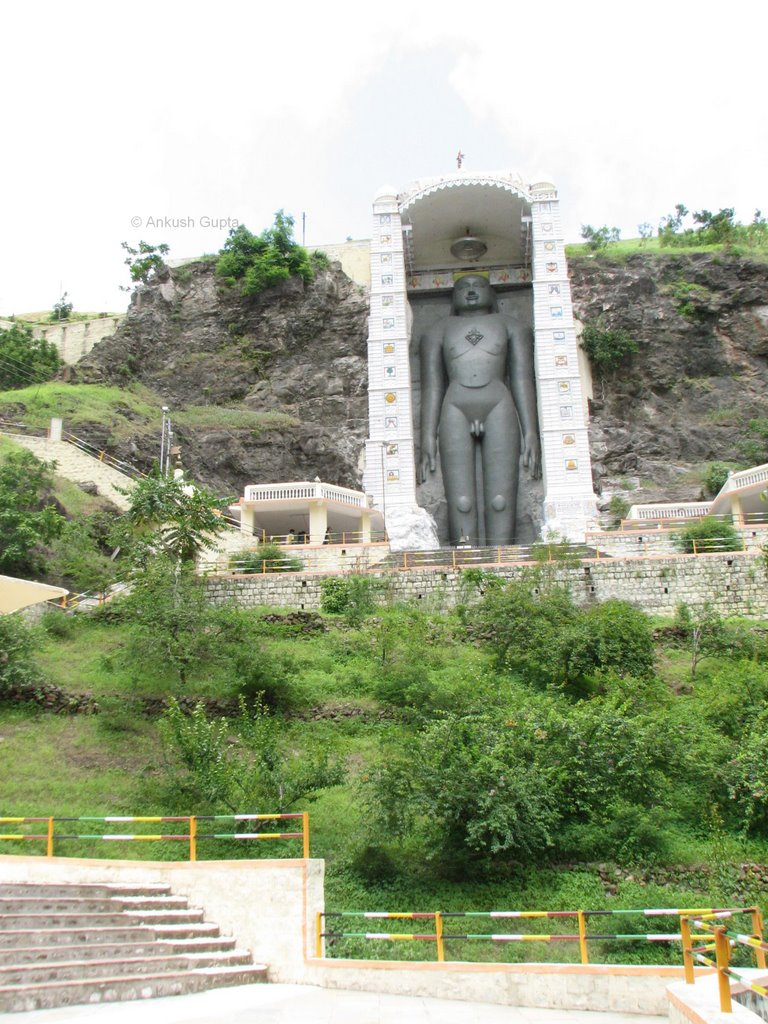
Rishabhanatha monolith at Bawangaja

The influence of the merchant community extended well beyond the west, creating a pan-Indian network of artistic patronage. In the Bundelkhand region of Central India, the Chandela rulers commissioned the Jain temples at Khajuraho (10th–11th century), which share the distinct architectural style of their Hindu counterparts. The site of Deogarh also remained a vital center, famous for the erection of numerous "Sahastrakuta" (thousand-Jina) pillars in the 13th century. Further south in the Satpura Range, the faith's prominence is attested by the 12th-century Bawangaja monolith, an 84-foot statue of Rishabhanatha carved directly into the mountain.

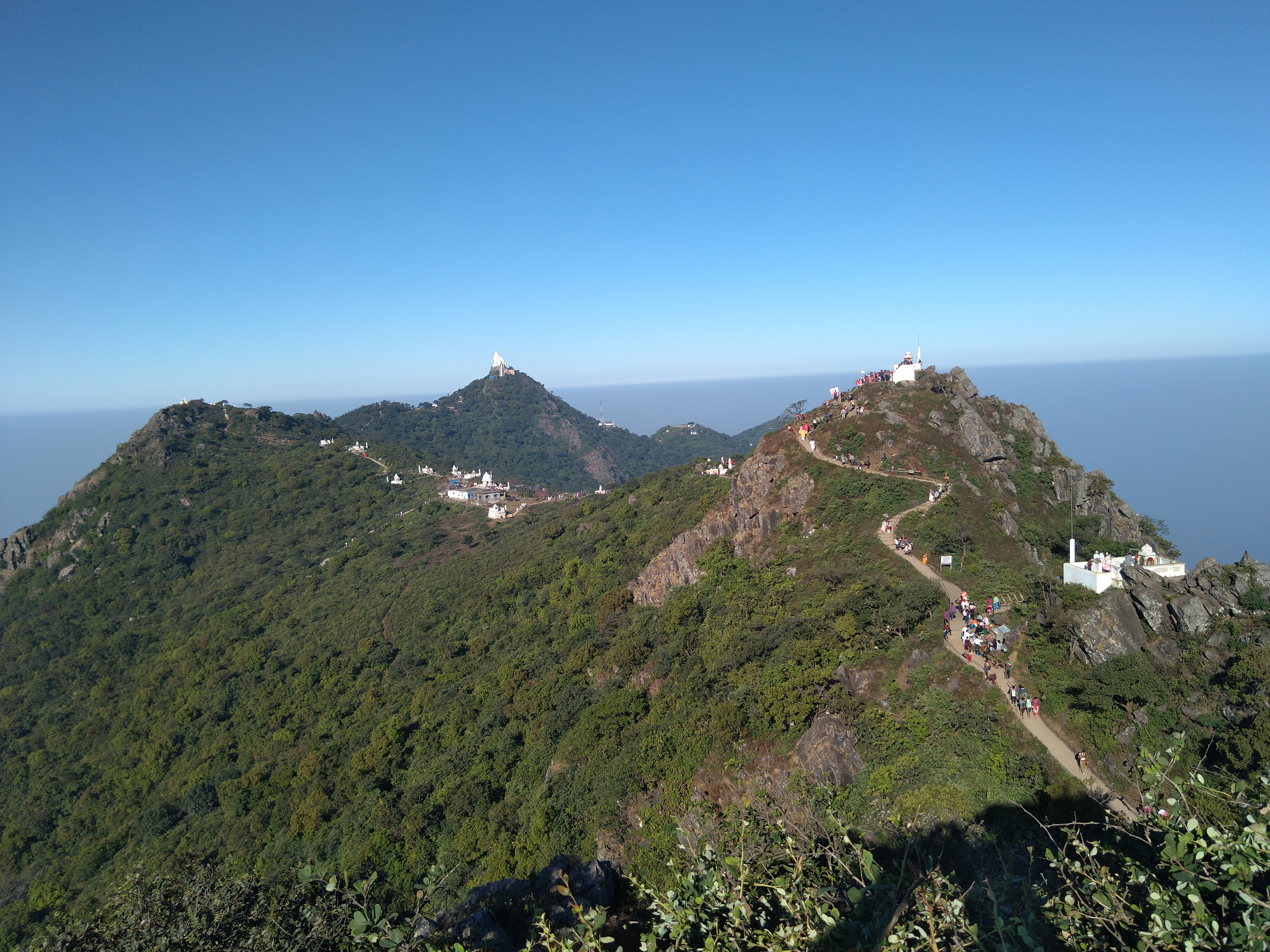
Shikharji mountain where Jain tradition places nirvana of 20 out of 24 tirthankaras

This architectural patronage reached Eastern India as well. In modern Jharkhand, the site of Shikharji saw the construction of a temple housing twenty tirthankara idols financed by Vastupala, demonstrating the trans-regional reach of the western merchant-ministers.

=== Persecution and resilience ===
While the guilds provided economic stability, the community faced religious and military challenges. In the South, the rise of Lingayatism and the conversion of the Hoysala king Vishnuvardhana (c. 1108 CE) to Vaishnavism posed significant threats. However, scholars note that his queen, Shantaladevi, and his general, Gangaraja, remained devout Jains, ensuring continued state patronage despite the monarch's personal conversion. Gangaraja, under the guidance of his spiritual teacher Subhachandra, launched campaigns to restore Jain temples, and the era even saw female generals like Jakkiyabbe commanding respect. However, sectarian conflict persisted; British-era scholar Helmuth von Glasenapp notes that during the 11th century, Basava, a minister to the Kalachuri king Bijjala II, converted numerous Jains to Lingayatism, with legends describing the destruction or conversion of Jain temples to Shaivite use.

Simultaneously, the Islamic invasions by Mahmud Ghazni (1001 CE) and Mohammad Ghori (1175 CE) caused significant disruption, including the destruction of temples and pilgrimage centers. This existential threat prompted Jain scholars like Jinadatta Suri to reinterpret the doctrine of Ahimsa (non-violence), arguing that fighting in self-defense to protect the faith did not constitute a loss of merit. Despite these pressures, monastic activity continued in defensible locations, such as the rock-cut caves of Mangi-Tungi (c. 12th century), which feature a large collection of tirthankara sculptures. Jain monasticism also utilized large natural cave systems, as evidenced by the Belum Caves in Andhra Pradesh, where archaeological finds confirm a long period of occupation.

== Diplomacy in the Sultanate and Mughal Era (1300 CE – 1650 CE) ==
=== Crisis and resilience: Gwalior and Ranakpur ===
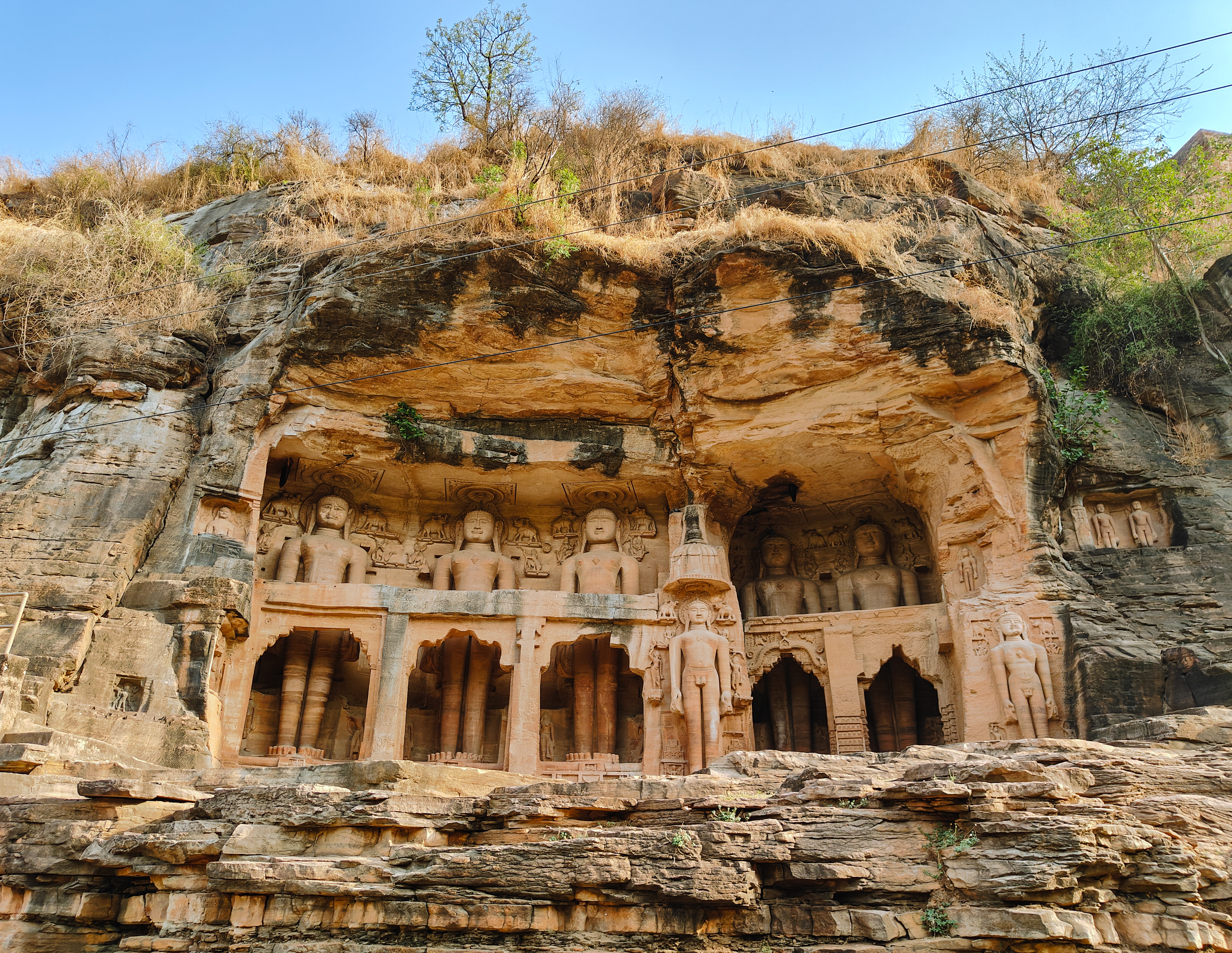
The Rock-cut Jain monuments of Gwalior

The medieval period was marked by a dual strategy of retreat into fortified locations and the construction of grand architectural statements. The Gwalior Fort became a major center for Digambara Jainism, housing nearly 100 rock-cut monuments created between the 14th and 15th centuries. Inscriptions credit the Tomara kings (1440–1453 CE) for these excavations, which include the massive Siddhachal and Gopachal colossi. While the Siddhachal caves were completed by 1473 CE, many of these statues were defaced around 1527 on the orders of the Mughal emperor Babur.

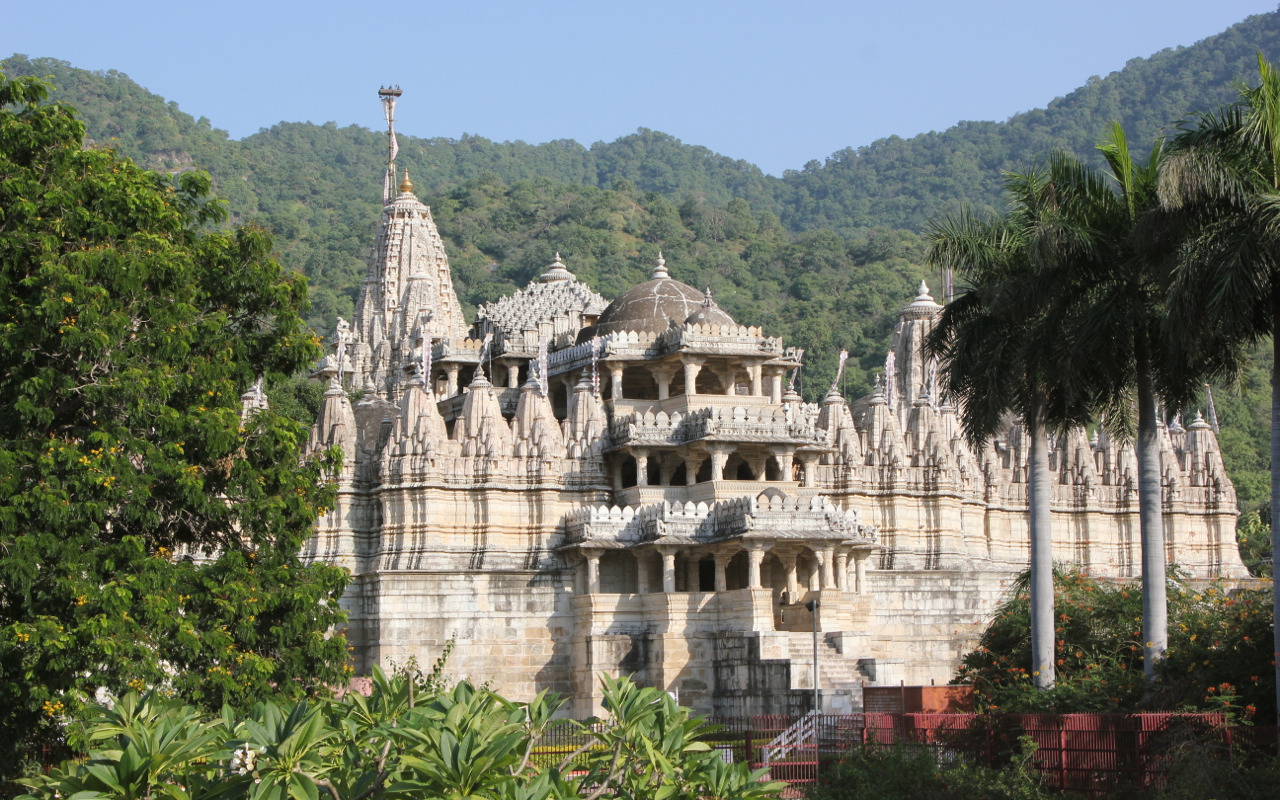
Chaumukha Jain Temple at Ranakpur in Aravalli range near Udaipur, Rajasthan

In Rajasthan, the community responded to political instability by building the fortress-like Ranakpur Jain Temple in the Aravalli range. Built in the 15th century under the patronage of Dharna Shah, a wealthy Jain minister, this temple reflects a continuation of the Western Indian style. It features a complex Chaumukha (four-faced) plan and is renowned for its hall of 1,444 carved pillars, of which no two are identical.

=== Institutional survival: The Bhattaraka tradition ===
During the medieval period, particularly from the 14th century onwards, the Digambara tradition developed a specialized clerical class known as the Bhattarakas. Unlike the traditional naked monks (Munis) who were bound by strict vows of homelessness and non-possession, Bhattarakas were pontiffs who wore orange robes, resided in permanent monasteries (Mathas), and managed the community's temporal assets.

The Bhattarakas served as the 'Institutional Shield' for the community during the Delhi Sultanate and Mughal eras. Because naked ascetics could not legally sign treaties or hold land titles, the Bhattarakas acted as the legal heads of the religion, negotiating with rulers to protect temples and managing the vast Jain Bhandaras (libraries). The seats of the Bhattarakas, such as at Shravanabelagola, Moodabidri, and Delhi, became centers of literary preservation, ensuring the survival of ancient texts like the Shatkhandagama and the Dhavala commentaries.

=== Competition and persecution ===
Jainism faced persecution during Lingayat movements in Telugu and Kannada speaking territories like Wodeyar of Mysore and Ummatur (1399–1610), Nayaks of Keladi (1550–1763). In 1683, they stamped the lingam symbol in the main temple complex of Jains in Halebidu. Digambaras were forced to perform Shaiva rites.

After the 12th century, the temples, pilgrimage and Digambara tradition of Jainism suffered persecution during the Muslim rule, with the exception of Akbar whose respect for Hiravijaya and support for Jainism led to a temporary ban on animal killing during the Jain religious festival of Paryushana. Akbar (1542–1605), influenced by the Śvetāmbara monk Hiravijaya, ordered the release of caged birds and banned the killing of animals during the Jain festival of Paryushana. Following the reign of Akbar, the community navigated a more volatile political landscape. While Jains faced periods of persecution in the 16th century, their scholars actively engaged in inter-religious dialogue. The Jain monk Hiravijaya Suri debated religious ideas with Mughal scholars, asserting that while Islam and Jainism differed, the Jain principle of Ahimsa (compassion) could complement imperial governance. Jain texts from this period continue to praise Akbar for his religious tolerance and the issuance of decrees protecting Jain pilgrimage sites.

=== Financial diplomacy and the merchant-state ===
Following the reign of Akbar, the community navigated a more volatile political landscape by leveraging the immense economic power of its lay merchants (Sravakas). This period saw the rise of "Financial Diplomacy," where Jain merchants acted as bankers to the empire, securing religious protection in exchange for economic stability.

A noted general and minister, Bhamashah (1547–1600) was a close aide to Maharana Pratap of Mewar. The financial support provided by him—famously liquidating his private fortune—helped Maharana Pratap to restore his army and reclaim much of his lost territory, establishing the Jain ethos of philanthropic patriotism.

Based in Surat, Virji Vora (c. 1590–1670) was described as the wealthiest merchant of his time, holding a monopoly on the spice trade. He frequently financed the British East India Company and Mughal governors, acting as a stabilizing economic force in Western India.

The first Nagarsheth (City Merchant Chief) of Ahmedabad, Shantidas Jhaveri (c. 1580–1659) was a jeweler to the Mughal court. He utilized his influence with Emperor Shah Jahan to secure imperial decrees (firmans) that restored the Chintamani Parsvanath temple and granted Jains control over the pilgrimage site of Palitana.

Migrating from Rajasthan to Patna, Hiranand Sahu laid the foundation for the banking dynasty that would later become known as the House of Jagat Seth, which eventually controlled the imperial mints and treasury of Bengal.

== The reformation and pre-modern identity (1650 CE – 1850 CE) ==
=== The internal reformation: Iconoclasm and purism ===
By the mid-17th century, the Jain civilization underwent a period of intense internal scrutiny, leading to movements that challenged established ritualism. In the Śvetāmbara tradition, a scripturalist movement initiated by the 15th-century scribe Lonka Shah crystallized into the Sthanakvasi sect (c. 1653 CE). This group rejected idol worship entirely, arguing that temple rituals were later accretions not found in the original Agamas. This reformist trend continued with the founding of the Śvetāmbara Terapanth sect (c. 1760 CE) by Acharya Bhikshu, who established a strict hierarchical monastic order focused on ascetic discipline rather than temple management.

Parallel to this, the Digambara community in North India saw the rise of the Adhyatma (Spiritual) movement in Jaipur, led by the layman scholar Pandit Todarmal (1719–1766). Leading a revolt against the Bhattarakas (land-owning clerics) whom he accused of corruption and lax conduct, Todarmal advocated for a return to doctrine and direct soul-realization. His magnum opus, Mokshamarga Prakashak (Illuminator of the Path to Liberation), remains a foundational text for modern Digambara theology, emphasizing education over ritual prowess.

=== Crisis and diplomacy in the Late Mughal Era ===
In the Punjab region, the community built strategic alliances with the rising Sikh power. Diwan Todar Mal (distinct from the Jaipur scholar Pandit Todarmal) was an Oswal Śvetāmbara Jain who served as the Dewan in the court of Wazir Khan, the Mughal Governor of Sirhind. He is revered in Sikh history for his act of defiance and devotion in 1704 CE following the execution of the Sahibzadas (the young sons of Guru Gobind Singh) and the death of Mata Gujri.

According to tradition, authorities refused to provide land for their cremation unless Todar Mal covered the required ground with gold coins (ashrafis) placed vertically. He paid this exorbitant price—often cited as the costliest land purchase in history—to perform the last rites. While modern historians note that Todar Mal may have died prior to this event and the act was likely performed by his descendants, the legend remains a potent symbol of Jain-Sikh solidarity. His family eventually lost their status and wealth due to the wrath of Wazir Khan, but their residence (haveli) was famously spared destruction by Banda Singh Bahadur and later Sikh rulers out of respect for his sacrifice.

=== The financial zenith: The House of Jagat Seth ===
In the 18th century, the political power of the Jain merchant class peaked with the House of Jagat Seth (Marwari-Oswal bankers) in Bengal. The title Jagat Seth ('Banker of the World') was conferred by the Mughal Emperor, signifying their dominance over the imperial treasury.

Historian William Dalrymple notes that this Jain family controlled the minting of coins and held capital reserves that exceeded those of the Bank of England at the time. Their financial support was pivotal in the rise of the British East India Company. The Jagat Seths, alienated by the policies of the Nawab of Bengal, financed the forces of Robert Clive before the Battle of Plassey (1757), effectively facilitating the transition from Mughal to British rule in Eastern India.

== Modern Renaissance and law (1850 CE – 1947 CE) ==
=== Colonial encounter and the merchant princes ===
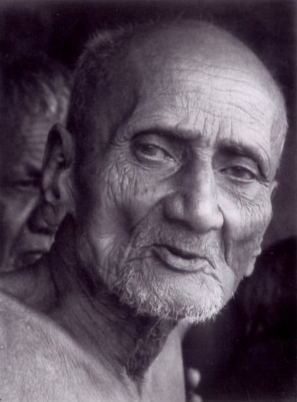
Image of Shantisagar, a Digambara Jain monk

The British colonial rule era, according to von Glasenapp in 1925, allowed Jains to pursue their religion without persecutions they had faced before. Further, the British government promoted trade, which allowed members of the Jain community to pursue their traditional economic activity. According to von Glasenapp, Jain businessmen and Jainism thrived during this period, and they used their financial success during the British Raj to rebuild Jain temples. For example, the Dharmanatha temple was built in Ahmedabad (Gujarat) in 1848.

This era saw the rise of merchant princes like Premchand Roychand (1831–1906), the "Cotton King" of Bombay, who founded the Bombay Stock Exchange and financed the University of Mumbai's Rajabai Clock Tower. Similarly, in Central India, Seth Hukamchand (1874–1959) utilized his industrial wealth to construct the Kanch Mandir in Indore and sponsor the publication of ancient scripture.

The British census reported a drop in Jain population between 1891 and 1921, from 1.417 million to 1.179 million. This may be from the Jain conversions to Hinduism and causes such as famines and epidemics. M. Whitney Kelting in 2001 states, in contrast, that in Gujarat and Maharashtra, British merchants actually took over the trades that Jains traditionally engaged in. This was in part responsible for major Jain community migrations during the British colonial era.

The British colonial government in India, as well as Indian princely states, passed laws that made monks roaming naked in streets a crime, one that led to arrest. This law particularly impacted the Digambara tradition monks. The Akhil Bharatiya Digambara Jaina Samaj opposed this law, and argued that it interfered with the religious rights of Digambaras. Digambara monk Shantisagar entered Bombay (now Mumbai) in 1927, but was forced to cover his body. He then led an India-wide tour as the naked monk with his followers, to various Digambara sacred sites, and he was welcomed by kings of the Maharashtra provinces. Shantisagar fasted to oppose the restrictions imposed on Digambara monks by British Raj and demanded their discontinuance. The colonial-era laws that banned naked monks were abolished only after India gained independence.

=== Academic recognition ===
British era Christian invaders wrote about Jainism, but typically stereotyping it as "a coldly austere religion of pure asceticism, with no 'heart', preoccupied only with not harming microorganisms". The discussion emphasized the ascetic extremes, rather than the values. They criticized the Jain theories on non-violence stating that this value is essentially equal to "doing nothing", because it entails not "hurting" other beings, but does not demand the "positive ethic of helping someone suffering". According to Jeffery D. Long, these missionary writings were a distortion of Jain theology because Jainism does teach, value and has a historic record of charity, and compassion is an essential value in Jainism for spiritual development.

Some Christian writers critiqued Jainism for its cosmology, with extraordinary time scales and cyclic time periods. However, Long states, the genesis theories in Christianity and other religions suffer from equivalent issues and they present the world to have been created few thousand years ago, in a short period of time. Similarly, historic Christian writers critiqued the lack of "saving grace" in Jainism. For example, Sinclair Stevenson wrote in 1915 that the "heart of Jainism was empty because it lacked the saving grace of Jesus".

Virchand Gandhi was the official delegate representing Jainism at the first World's Parliament of Religions in Chicago in 1893. He was one of the first historical figures to defend Jain vegetarianism on a global stage to a Western audience. Gandhi systematically dismantled the contemporary Western assumption that vegetarianism led to physical weakness, successfully reframing the Jain diet in the West as a highly rational, scientifically grounded, and compassionate lifestyle.

=== Industrialization and nation building ===
As the independence movement gained momentum, prominent Jain families pivoted from trade to heavy industry and institution building. Walchand Hirachand (1882–1953) pioneered India's indigenous shipping (Scindia Steam), aviation (Hindustan Aeronautics Limited), and automobile (Premier Automobiles Limited) sectors, challenging British commercial monopolies. In Ahmedabad, the Sarabhai and Lalbhai families, led by Ambalal Sarabhai and Kasturbhai Lalbhai, played a dual role: they modernized the textile industry while financing national institutions like the Indian Institute of Management (IIM) and the Physical Research Laboratory (PRL). Sahu Shanti Prasad Jain (1911–1977) expanded into media, acquiring The Times of India group and establishing the Bharatiya Jnanpith to promote Indian literature. These figures marked a shift in community philanthropy from traditional charity to building the secular infrastructure of modern India.

=== Monastic revivals and reform movements ===
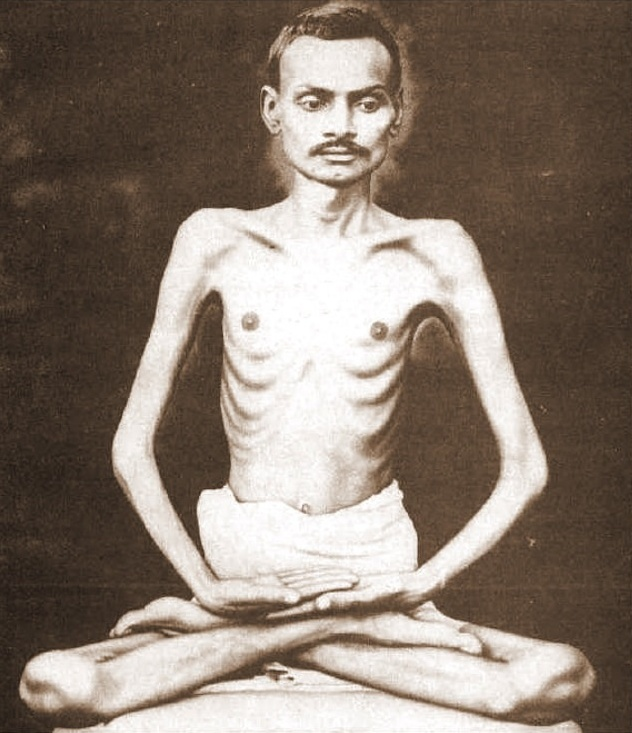
Shrimad Rajchandra, Jain monk and spiritual teacher of Mahatma Gandhi in Lotus position

Shrimad Rajchandra was inspired by works of Kundakunda and Digambara mystical tradition. Nominally belonging to the Digambara tradition, his followers sometimes consider his teaching as a new path of Jainism, neither Śvetāmbara nor Digambara, and revere him as a saint. His path is sometimes referred as Raj Bhakta Marg, Kavipanth, or Shrimadiya, which has mostly lay followers as was Rajchandra himself. His teachings influenced Kanji Swami, Dada Bhagwan, Rakesh Jhaveri, Saubhagbhai, Lalluji Maharaj (Laghuraj Swami), Atmanandji and several other religious figures. Some of them established temples and institutions in his dedication and to spread his teachings. Such temples often house his pictures and images based on photographs taken in a studio in various meditation postures just a month before his death. Shrimad Rajchandra's teachings have been popular in the Jain diaspora communities; mostly in East Africa, the United Kingdom and North America. Bauer notes that "[in] recent years there has been a convergence of the Kanji Swami Panth and the Shrimad Rajcandra movement, part of trend toward a more eucumenical and less sectarian Jainism among educated, mobile Jains living overseas." A special cover featuring him and Rabindranath Tagore was published by the India Post on occasion of Gandhi Jayanti in 2002.

Kshullak Ganeshprasad Varni (1874–1961) was a foundational figure of the modern Digambara intellectual revival. He established several institutions for advanced learning, most notably the Syadvad Mahavidyalaya at Varanasi in 1905, which reintroduced traditional Jain logic and philosophy into the modern university curriculum. His efforts, along with those of other reformers, were instrumental in standardizing Jain education in the post-independence era.

== Post-independence and global diaspora (1947 CE – present) ==
Following the independence of India in 1947, the Jain community transitioned from navigating colonial legal frameworks to establishing a distinct identity within a secular democracy and expanding as a global diaspora. This period is characterized by legal institutionalization, professional scaling of philanthropic networks, and the universalization of Jain ethics. Some of the other prominent monks of modern era include Gyansagar and Acharya Vidyasagar, Tarun Sagar and Vidyananda.

=== Legal identity and constitutional recognition ===
The post-independence era began with a complex legal negotiation regarding Jain identity within the new Indian state. Under Article 25 of the Constitution of India, Jains were historically grouped with Hindus for personal law purposes, a classification that scholars note created a "legal invisibility" for the distinct religious tradition. This led to a multi-decade political campaign for recognition as a distinct religious minority. Scholarly analysis of the movement highlights that the eventual notification of Jains as a National Minority in 2014 was not merely a symbolic victory but a strategic acquisition of rights to manage educational institutions and religious trusts independently of state-led "Hindu" boards.

=== Global diaspora and the "Samanvaya" model ===
A significant wave of migration starting in the 1960s established robust Jain communities in the United Kingdom, North America, and East Africa. Sociological studies of these communities observe a strategic shift from the rigid sectarianism of the Indian heartland to a "Non-Sectarian" (Samanvaya) model. This model prioritized community cohesion over Digambara or Śvētāmbara distinctions to sustain institutional growth in a foreign context. The construction of monumental marble temples abroad, most notably the Jain Centre in Leicester, serves as a primary legacy of this era, acting as a cultural anchor for the second and third generations of the diaspora.

=== Modern institutional reform and digitization ===
The late 20th century saw the professionalization of Jain mercantile influence through international networking bodies. These organizations applied modern corporate governance and venture capital models to traditional community philanthropy, focusing on economic empowerment and social mobility. Parallel to this economic scaling, the community initiated a massive technological project to preserve the "Version Control" of its literary heritage. Scholarly accounts of the "National Mission for Manuscripts" and private initiatives detail the digitization of thousands of palm-leaf and paper documents from ancient Bhandaras, ensuring the survival of the Jain canon in the digital era.

=== Environmental ethics and contemporary pluralism ===
In the 21st century, Jainism has pivoted toward a global dialogue on ecology and bioethics. Scholars of religion have identified the ancient doctrine of Parasparopagraho Jivanam (interdependence) as a foundational framework for modern "Green Jainism," which promotes sustainability and animal rights as modern iterations of Ahimsa. Furthermore, the doctrine of Anekantavada (non-absolutism) is increasingly cited in academic circles as a sophisticated philosophical tool for conflict resolution and pluralism. Contemporary research also explores the intersections between Jain cosmology and modern physics, positioning the tradition's metaphysics as relevant to current scientific and ethical debates.

== See also ==
- Jain cosmology
- Timeline of Jainism
- History of Buddhism
- History of Hinduism
