= Pandit Todarmal =

Indian academic

- Born: 1719
- Died: 1766 (aged 46–47)
- Occupation: Writer
- Works: Moksha-marga-prakashaka
- Children: Gumaniram

Pandit Todarmal (1719–1766) was an eminent Indian Jain scholar and writer. He led the creation of terapanthi community among the Digambara Jains by rejecting the authority of bhattarakas. He wrote moksha-marga-prakashaka.

His son, Gumaniram, formed a sub-sect named Gumanapantha in 1770s and named it shuddha terapantha amana (pure terapantha tradition) by making the rules stricter.

== See also ==
- History of Jainism
