= Lalbhai =

Lalbhai is a name of Indian origin. Notable people with the name include:

- Lalbhai Dalpatbhai (1863-1912), Indian industrialist
- Kasturbhai Lalbhai (1894-1980), Indian industrialist
- Umedram Lalbhai Desai (1868-1930), Indian medical doctor
- Arvind Narottambhai Lalbhai (1918-2007), Indian industrialist

== See also ==
- Lalbhai Dalpatram College of Engineering, Indian engineering college
- Lalbhai Dalpatbhai Museum, Indian museum
