= Legal status of Jainism as a distinct religion in India =

Jainism is considered to be a legally distinct religion in India. A section of scholars earlier considered it as a Hindu sect or a Buddhist heresy, but it is one of the three ancient Indian religions. On 27 January 2014, the Government of India explicitly awarded the status of a "minority religion" to the Jain community in India, as per Section 2(c) of the National Commission for Minorities (NCM) Act (NCM), 1992.

== History of Jain demand for minority status ==
- The Jain demand for minority status is almost a century old, when in British India the Viceroy and Governor General of India, Lord Minto took a decision in principle of giving representation to important minorities in the Central Legislature. Seth Manek Chand Hirachand from Mumbai, an eminent Jain leader from Mumbai and the then Acting President of the Bharatvarshiya Digamber Jain Sabha made an appeal in 1909 to the Governor General for the inclusion of the Jain community for representation in the council. Seth Manek Chand's petition was transferred to the Government of Bombay and the Secretary to the Government of Bombay stated in his reply dated 15 October 1909 as follows:

"I am directed to inform you that a number of seats have been reserved for representation of minorities by nomination and that in allotting them, the claim of the important Jain Community will receive full consideration. "

- In a Memorandum by the Representative of the Jain Community to the Constituent Assembly in March/April 1947 a strong appeal was made for the inclusion of the Jain community as a minority religious community.
- In his speech on 3 September 1949, Jawahar Lal Nehru said: No doubt India has a vast majority of Hindus, but they could not forget in fact there are also minorities Muslims, Christians, Parsis and Jains. If India were understood as Hindu Rashtra it meant that the minorities were not cent per cent citizens of the country:
- Jainism is mentioned as a religion along with Buddhism and Sikhism in explanation II of the Article 25 of the India Constitution relating to Fundamental Right to religions freedom. On this issue Jawahar Lal Nehru, the then prime Minister, in his letter dated 31.01.1950 assured a Jain Deputation that they need not have any misgivings on this clear constitutional position.
- The second stanza of Jana Gana Mana, Indian National Anthem clearly enunciates Jainism as a separate religious denomination in line with Hinduism, Islam and other religions.
- The Indian Supreme Court in 2005 ruled that Jains, Sikhs and Buddhist are part of broader Hindu fold, as they are Indic religions and interconnected to each other, although they are distinct religions.

=== Recommendation of National Minorities Commission ===
In 1993, the National Minorities Commission arrived at their recommendation that the Jain community be declared as a minority religious community. It was in consideration of the following:

- the relevant constitutional provisions,
- various judicial pronouncements,
- the fundamental differences in philosophy and beliefs (theism vs.atheism principally) vis-a-vis Hinduism, and
- the substantial number of Jain population in the country.

It resolved to recommend to the Government of India that the Jains deserve to be recognised as a distinct religious minority, and that, therefore the Government of India may consider including them in the listing of "Minorities."

== The Bal Patil Judgement ==
In 2005, the Supreme Court of India declined to issue a writ of Mandamus towards granting Jains the status of a religious minority throughout India. The Court however left it to the respective states to decide on the minority status of Jain religion.

In one of the observations of the Supreme Court, not forming part of the judgment, the Court said:

Thus, 'Hinduism' can be called a general religion and common faith of India whereas 'Jainism' is a special religion formed on the basis of quintessence of Hindu religion. Jainism places greater emphasis on non-violence ('Ahimsa') and compassion ('Karuna'). Their only difference from Hindus is that Jains do not believe in any creator like God but worship only the perfect human-being whom they called Tirthankar. Lord Mahavir was one in the generation of Thirthankars. The Tirathankars are embodiments of perfect human-beings who have achieved human excellence at mental and physical levels. In philosophical sense, Jainism is a reformist movement amongst Hindus like Brahamsamajis, Aryasamajis and Lingayats. The three main principles of Jainism are Ahimsa, Anekantvad and Aparigrah.

The Supreme Court also noted: " … that the State Governments of Chhattisgarh, Maharashtra, Madhya Pradesh, Uttar Pradesh and Uttarakhand have already notified Jains as 'minority' in accordance with the provisions of the respective State Minority Commissions Act."

This cast a doubt on the independent standing of Jain religion. Scholars in the Jain tradition, as well as several groups amongst the Jain community protested, and emphasised that Jain religion stands as a religion in its own right. While Hinduism as a mode of living, and as a culture is to be found across various religions in India because of several common customs, traditions and practices, but as religions Hindu religion and Jain religion are distinct.

== 2014: National minority status granted ==
On 20 January 2014, the Government of India awarded the minority status to the Jain community in India, as per Section 2(c) of the National Commission for Minorities (NCM) Act (NCM), 1992. This made the Jain community which makes for 7 million or 0.4 percent of the population as per 2001 census, the sixth community to be designated this status as a "national minority", after Muslims, Christians, Sikhs, Buddhists and Parsis. Though Jains already had minority status in 11 states of India including Uttar Pradesh, Madhya Pradesh, Chhattisgarh and Rajasthan, in 2005 a petition was filed with Supreme Court of India, by community representatives, which was also backed by the National Minorities Commission. In its judgement the court left the decision to the Central government.

== U.P. Basic Shiksha Parishad Judgment ==
In 2006, the Supreme Court opined that "Jain Religion is indisputably is not a part of Hindu Religion".

=== Illustrations noted by the Supreme Court ===
Jainism and Other Religions: Illustrations noted by Supreme Court of India in the U.P. Basic Shiksha Parishad Judgment (the para numbers refer to the paragraphs in the Judgment):

==== Jawaharlal Nehru ====
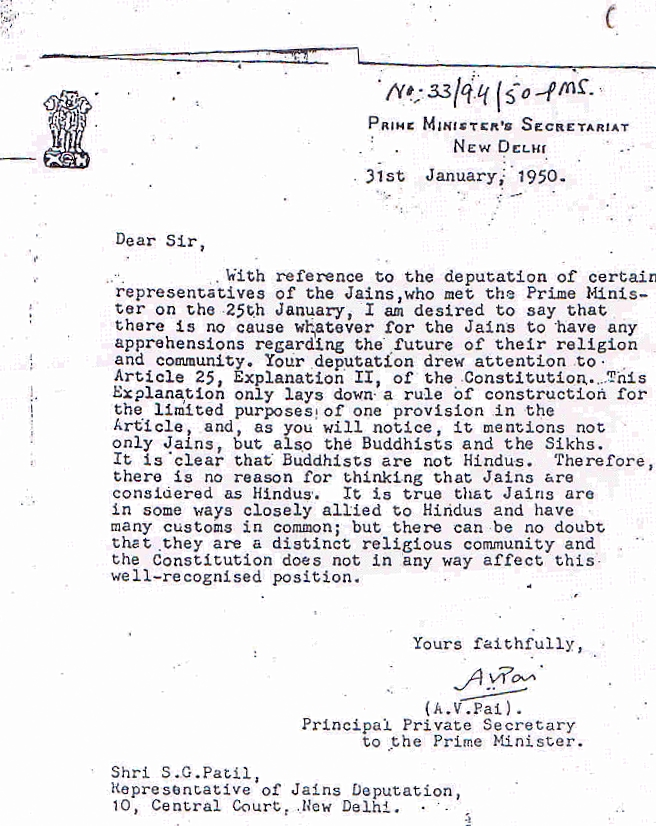
Prime Ministers letter to Jain delegation

On 3 September 1949, while addressing a public meeting at Allahabad, the first Prime Minister of India, Jawaharlal Nehru said:

"No doubt India has a vast majority of Hindus, but they could not forget the fact that there were also minorities - Muslims, Parsis, Christians, Sikhs and Jains. If India was understood as a Hindu Rashtra, it meant that the minorities were not cent percent citizens of this country."

The said speech can be considered to be a clarification on Article 25 of the Constitution of India.

10.2 On 31 January 1950, the PPS to the then Prime Minister of India sent a letter to the Jain Deputation on behalf of the then Prime Minister, which reads as under: (See adjoining image for original letter)

"With reference to the deputation of certain representatives of the Jains, who met the Prime Minister on 25 January 1950, I am desired to say that there is no cause whatever for the Jains to have any apprehensions regarding the future of their religion and community. Your deputation drew attention to Article 25, explanation II of the Constitution. This explanation only lays down a rule of construction for the limited purpose of the provision in the article and as you will notice, it mentions not only of Jains but also Buddhists and the Sikhs. It is clear therefore, there is no reason for thinking that Jains are considered to be Hindus. It is true that Jains in some ways closely linked to Hindus and have many customs in common, but there can be no doubt that they are a distinct religious community and constitution does not in any way affect this well recognized position.
Yours faithfully,
Sd.
A.V. Pai
Principal Private Secretary to the Prime Minister"

10.5 Jawaharlal Nehru, in his book Discovery of India, mentioned as under:

"Buddhism and Jainism were certainly not Hinduism or even the Vedic Dharma. Yet they arose in India and were integral parts of Indian life, culture and philosophy. A Buddhist or Jain, in India, is a hundred per cent product of Indian thought and culture, yet neither is a Hindu by faith. It is, therefore, entirely misleading to refer to Indian culture as Hindu culture."

==== Dr. S. Radhakrishnan ====
10.3 Dr. S. Radhakrishnan, the former President of India, in his book "Indian Philosophy Vol I" mentioned as under:

"The Bhagawat Purana endorses the view that Rishbhadeva was the founder of Jainism. There is evidence to show that so far back as the first century B.C. there were people who were worshipping Rishabhadeva, the first Tirthankara. There is no doubt that Jainism prevailed even before Vardhamana Mahaveera or Parsvanatha. The Yajurveda mentions the names of three Tirthankaras-Rishabh, Ajitnath & Aristanemi."

15. Dr. Radhakrishnan, who edited the 6th Volume of The Cultural Heritage of India, mentioned as under:

"The Jains claim a great antiquity for their religion. Their earliest prophet was Rishabhdeva. Who is mentioned even in the Vishnu and Bhagawat Puranas as belonging to a very remote past. In the earliest Brahmanic literature are found traces of the existence of a religious Order."

== "Freedom of Religion Bill" controversy in Gujarat ==
The Freedom of Religion Bill was a controversial bill passed by the Gujarat state assembly. The bill was passed in 2003. An amendment to the bill was passed on 19 September 2006 which banned the forced conversion from one religion to another. The Anti-Conversion Act passed earlier was not clear on what forced conversion meant and to whom should it apply. Under the amendment Bill, a person need not seek permission in case he/she is converting from one sect to another of the same religion. It clubbed Jainism and Buddhism as denominations of Hinduism, like Shia and Sunnis are of Islam or Catholicism and Protestantism of Christianity. The move evoked strong protests from the state's Jain, Buddhist and Christian communities. The National Commission for Minorities also criticised the Gujarat Assembly's decision to club Jainism and Buddhism with Hinduism terming it to be in contravention of its 23 October 1993, notification classifying Buddhists as a "minority community."

Ultimately on 31 July 2007, finding it not in conformity with the concept of freedom of religion as embodied in Article 25 (1) of the Constitution, Governor Nawal Kishore Sharma returned the Gujarat Freedom of Religion (Amendment) Bill, 2006. The Governor held that Jainism and Buddhism are recognised as religions rather than denominations of Hinduism, something that the Amendment Bill sought to wrongly convey. A press release issued by Raj Bhavan, said "the proposed amendment would amount to withdrawing the protection against forceful or inappropriate religious conversions, particularly in case of Jains and Buddhists". The release cited large scale protests from different religious and social organisations, especially from the Jain and Christian communities, in indicating toward the unacceptability of the proposed amendment.

== Chronological order of various court judgments on Jainism as a separate religion ==
1. 1927 - In 1927 Madras High Court in Gateppa v. Eramma and others reported in AIR 1927 Madras 228 held that "Jainism as a distinct religion was flourishing several centuries before Christ". Jainism rejects the authority of the Vedas which form the bedrock of Hinduism and denies the efficacy of the various ceremonies which Hindus consider essential.
2. 1939 - In Hirachand Gangji v. Rowji Sojpal reported in AIR 1939 Bombay 377, it was observed that "Jainism prevailed in this country long before Brahmanism came into existence and held that field, and it is wrong to think that the Jains were originally Hindus and were subsequently converted into Jainism."
3. 1951 - A Division Bench of the Bombay High Court consisting of Chief Justice Chagla and Justice Gajendragadkar in respect of Bombay Harijan Temple Entry Act, 1947 (C.A. 91 of 1951) held that Jains have an independent religious entity and are different from Hindus.
4. 1954 - In The Commissioner Hindu Religious Endowments, Madras v. Sri Lakshmindra Thirtha Swamiar of Sri Shirur Mutt reported in AIR 1954 SC 282 this Court observed that there are well known religions in India like Buddhism and Jainism which do not believe in God, in any Intelligent First Cause. The Court recognised that Jainism and Buddhism are equally two distinct religions professed in India in contrast with Vedic religion.
5. 1958 - In well known Kerala Education Bill's case, 1957 reported in AIR 1958 SC 956, this Court held that to claim the minority rights, the Community must be numerically a minority by reference to the entire population of the State or country where the law is applicable. In that way also, the Jain Community is eligible for the claim.
6. 1968 - In Commissioner of Wealth Tax, West Bengal v. Smt. Champa Kumari Singhi & Others reported in AIR 1968 Calcutta 74, a Division Bench of the Calcutta High Court observed that "Jains rejected the authority of the Vedas which forms the bedrock of Hinduism and denied the efficacy of various ceremonies which the Hindus consider essential. It will require too much of boldness to hold that the Jains, dissenters from Hinduism, are Hindus, even though they disown the authority of the Vedas".
7. 1976 - In Arya Samaj Education Trust, Delhi & Others v. The Director of Education, Delhi Administration, Delhi & Others reported in AIR 1976 Delhi 207, it was held as follows: "Not only the Constitution but also the Hindu Code and the Census Reports have recognised Jains to belong to a separate religion." In the said judgement, the Court referred to the observations of various scholars in this behalf. The Court quoted Heinrich Zimmer in "Philosophies of India" wherein he stated that "Jainism denies the authority of the Vedas and the orthodox traditions of Hinduism. Therefore, it is reckoned as a heterodox Indian religion". The Court also quoted J. N. Farquhar in Modern Religious Movements in India wherein he stated that "Jainism has been a rival of Hinduism from the beginning". In the said judgment, in conclusion, the Court held that "for the purpose of Article 30(1), the Jains are a minority based on religion in the Union Territory of Delhi".
8. 1993 - In A.M. Jain College v. Government of Tamil Nadu (1993) 1 MLJ 140, the Court observed that it is also an admitted fact that the Jain community in Madras, Tamil Nadu is a religious and linguistic minority.
9. 2005 - Supreme Court of India gave verdict that Jainism, Sikhism (and Buddhism) are distinct religions, but are inter-connected and inter-related to Hinduism, so these three are part of wider broader Hindu religion, based on the historic background on how the Constitution had come into existence after.
10. 2006 - Supreme Court of India found that the "Jain Religion is indisputably not a part of the Hindu Religion".

== List of states in which Jains have been declared as minority ==
1. Maharashtra (which has the largest population of Jains in India)
2. Karnataka
3. Gujarat
4. Madhya Pradesh
5. Uttar Pradesh
6. Jharkhand
7. Delhi
8. Uttarakhand
9. West Bengal
10. Andhra Pradesh
11. Haryana
12. Tamil Nadu
13. Punjab
14. Assam
15. Rajasthan

== See also ==
- History of Jainism
