= Mary Whitney Kelting =

American ethnographer and scholar

M. Whitney Kelting
- Citizenship: United States
- Education: University of Wisconsin–Madison
- Known for: Religious Studies, Ethnography, Jainism
- Scientific career
- Workplaces: Northeastern University
- Thesis: Hearing the voices of the Śrāvikā : ritual and song in Jain laywomen's belief and practice

M. Whitney Kelting is an American ethnographer and scholar of Jainism who is an Associate Professor of Religious Studies in the Department of Philosophy and Religion at Northeastern University, College of Social Sciences and Humanities.

Professor Kelting’s research interests include the religions of South Asia, ritual theory, gender studies and cultural studies and she has published two books and many articles on these topics. She is a member of the editorial board of the Centre of Jaina Studies at the School of African and Oriental Studies, University of London. M. Whitney Kelting received her B.A from Colby College, and her MA and PhD in South Asian Language and Literature from the University of Wisconsin, Madison.

== Bibliography and research papers ==
=== Bibliography ===
Following is a partial list of her books:

- Kelting, M. Whitney (2009). Heroic Wives: Rituals, Stories and the Virtues of Jain Wifehood. Oxford University Press, USA. ISBN 9780195389647.
- Kelting, M. Whitney (2001). Singing to the Jinas: Jain Laywomen, Mandal Singing and the Negotiations of Jain Devotion. Oxford University Press. ISBN 9780195140118.
- Kelting, Mary Whitney. 1996. Hearing the voices of the Śrāvikā: ritual and song in Jain laywomen's belief and practice.

=== Research papers and conferences ===
- Tournaments of Honor: Jain Auctions, Gender, and Reputation, History of Religions 48(4):284-308 May 2009
- Candanbālā's Hair: Fasting, beauty, and the materialization of Jain wives Religion, 39:1, 1-10, DOI:
- Good wives, family protectors: Writing Jain Laywomen's memorials
