= Culture of Nashik =

Overview of the culture of Nasik (India)

Nashik-Trimbakeshwar Simhastha नाशिक-त्र्यंबकेश्वर सिंहस्थ कुंभमेळा
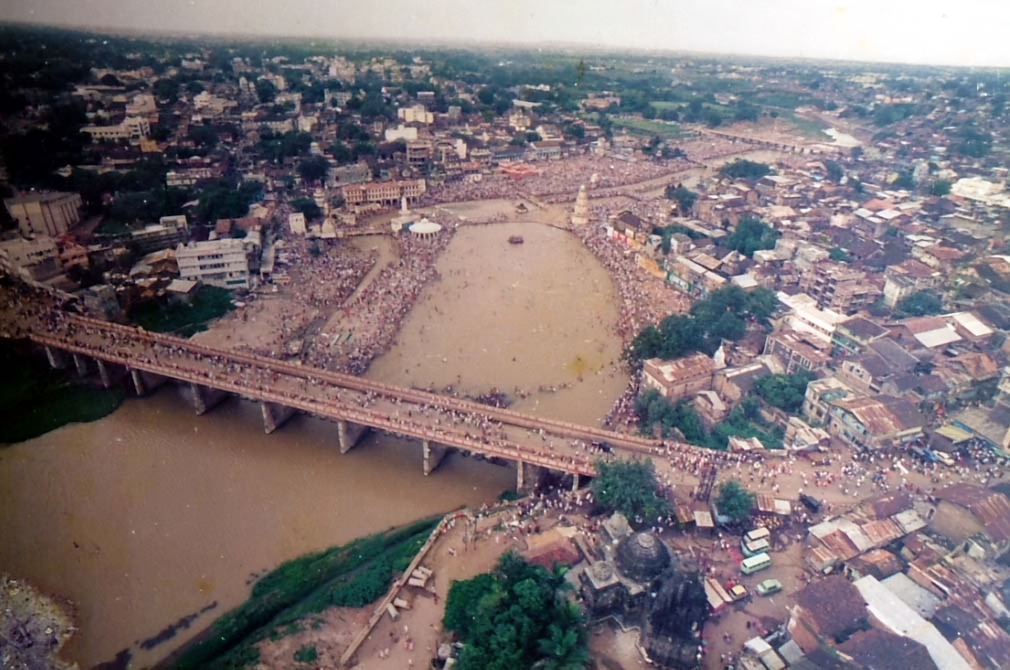
- 1989 Kumbh Mela at Nashik
- Status: active
- Genre: Fair
- Frequency: Every 12 years
- Venue: Banks of Godavari river
- Locations: Trimbak and Nashik
- Country: India
- Previous event: 2015
- Next event: 2027/2040
- Participants: Akharas, pilgrims
- Website: kumbhmela2015.maharashtra.gov.in

The culture of the city of Nashik, in northwestern Maharashtra, is centred around Hindu customs and festivals.

== History ==
Nashik Indian People tradition or Hindu culture festival. Nashik was included also under Ashok's Mighty Empire, it became popular in the era of Satavahanas, Nashik surrendered to the British on 19 April 1818.

The Nashik Kumbh Mela, also known as the Nashik-Trimbakeshwar Simhastha Kumbh Mela, is held every 12 years along the sacred Godavari River. Nashik and Trimbakeshwar form the two main centres of the Kumbh, with important religious traditions connected with Ramkund, the Godavari ghats and Kushavarta Tirtha. also you can see the history of nashik kumbh mela

== Festivals celebrated ==
=== Kumbh Mela ===
Nashik is home to Nashik-Trimbakeshwar Simhastha (Kumbh Mela)– a Hindu religious Mela (fair) held every 12 years. It is one of the four fairs traditionally recognized as Kumbha Melas, and is also known as Nashik-Trimbak Kumbha Mela or Nashik Kumbha Mela. The Nashik Kumbh Mela is normally considered to be the most holy celebrations in Hinduism.

=== Mahamastakabhisheka ===
The Mahamastakabhisheka rituals are performed once every twelve years on the Statue of Ahimsa, of the first Jain Tirthankar Rishabhdev in Mangi Tungi.

=== Rath Yatra ===
Rath Yatra is the main attraction of Ranmnavami where the bathing of idols, Lord Rama and Hanuman in the Ganges can be witnessed. This auspicious Rath Yatra is celebrated at the Sansthan Shri Kalaram Mandir located at the Panchvati Van, which is dedicated to Lord Rama. The second day of the festival is the most important one, in which a long procession headed by the Pujadhikari is held accompanied by the Rath Of Lord Yama. During the whole procession, the Pujadhikari faces the Rath with folded hands and also keeps fasting from the very first day of the Chaitra month. The festival of Ramnavami is celebrated by the bursting of crackers and pompous lighting which attracts people from all over the world.

=== Other Festivals ===
Nashik also hosts festivals for Makar Sankranti and Diwali.

== Religion ==
Nashik is home to many temples and religious sites of the Jain, Hindu, and Muslim religions. In February 2016, the Statue of Ahimsa, a 108 ft idol of the first Jain tirthankara Rishabhdev carved in monolithic stone was consecrated at Mangi Tungi. It is recorded in the Guinness Book of World Records as the tallest Jain idol in the world. It has become a major pilgrimage and tourist destination.

Nashik is situated at the foothills of Western Ghats, on the banks of River Godavari. The city hosts numerous religious pilgrimages and festivals, including the Nashik-Trimbakeshwar Simhastha, which is one of four Kumbh Mela fairs. It is held every 12 years in one of the four places in India including Nashik.

Nashik is also known for its abundant fruits and vegetables. The yield of grapes, strawberries, and onions in Nashik is among the highest in the country. Nashik's people are known for their cultural art, literature, and food.

== Languages ==
The primary language spoken in Nashik is Marathi. It is the native language of the city and state and originates from Prakrit. Hindi is also widely spoken by the population.

The literacy rate is 89.95%, with 93.40% of men literate, and 85.92% of women.

== Demographics ==
The city has a Hindu majority, but many religions are represented. As of 2011, the city was 85.21% Hindu, 8.90% Muslim, 3.18% Buddhist, 1.10% Jain, 1.00% Christian, 0.39% Sikh, 0.17% not stated, and 0.05% other.
