= List of Digambara Jain ascetics =

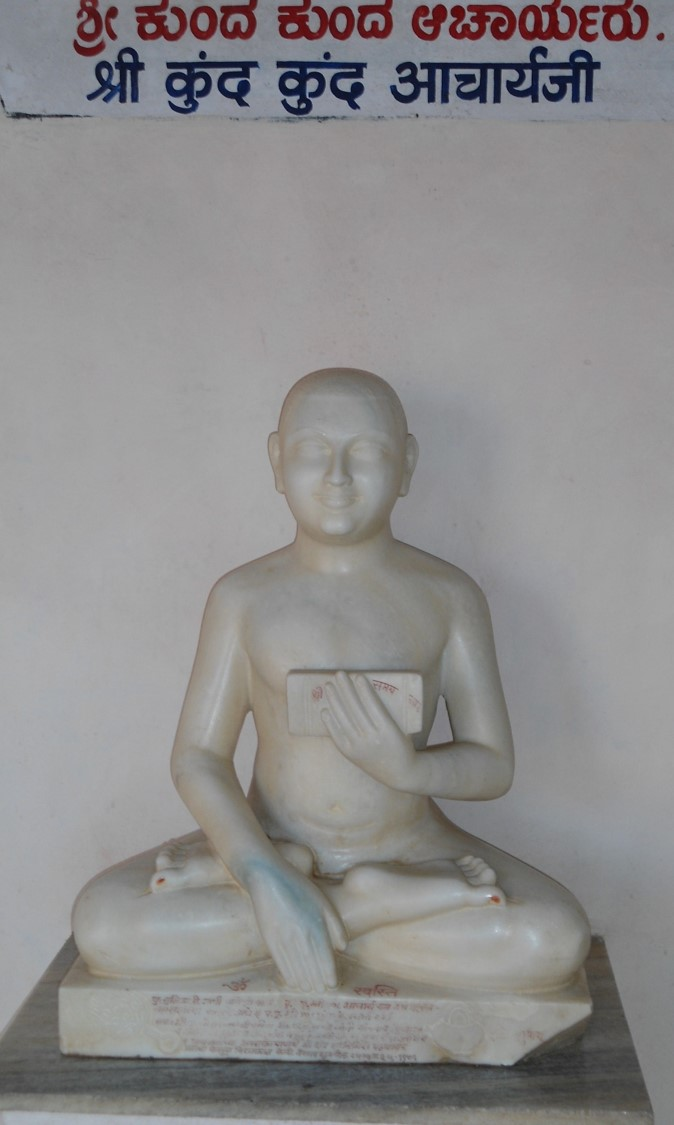
Idol of Kundakunda, the most revered Digambara acharya

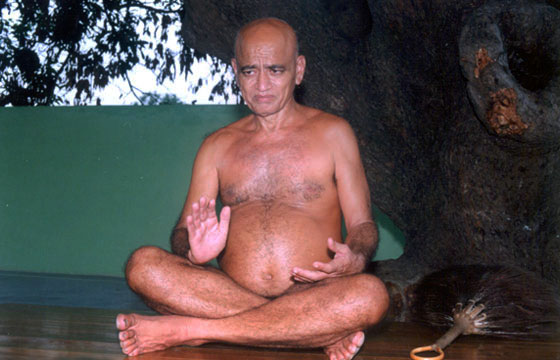
Acharya Vidyasagar(Jain monk)

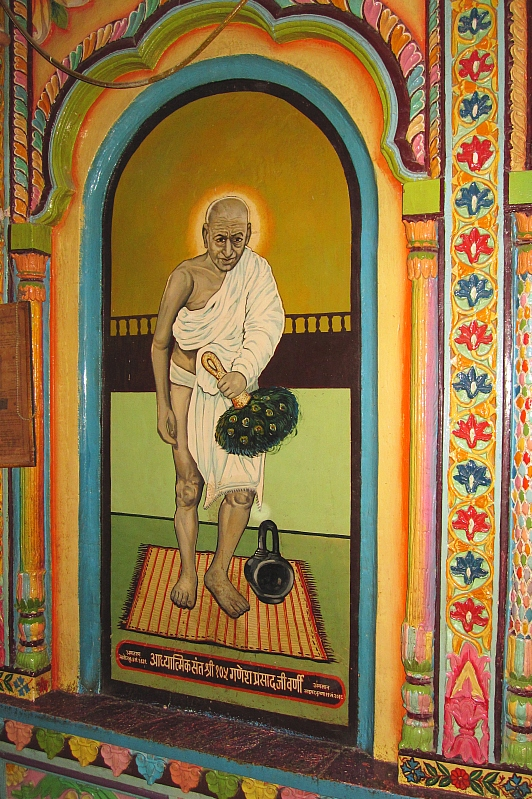
A mural depicting Ganeshprasad Varni

This is a list of the ascetics belonging to the Digambara sect of Jainism. These ascetics are known for their contributions to Jain philosophy and Jainism in general.

== Common era ==
- Acharya Kundakunda, 1st century CE
- Acharya Akalanka, c. 8th century, known for his works on Jain logic.
- Bhutabali
- Pushpadanta
- Aparajita
- Ilango Adigal
- Jinasena, preceptor of the Rashtrakuta rulers, 800–880
- Kumudchandra
- Nemichandra
- Pujyapada
- Virasena, 790–825

== Modern era (20th century onwards) ==
- Acharya Adisagar(Anklikar), 1866–1944
- Acharya Shantisagar, 1872–1955
- Jinendra Varni
- Acharya Gyansagar, 1891–1973
- Kshullak Ganeshprasad Varni, 1874–1961
- Acharya Deshbhushan, 1905–1987
- Acharya Aryanandi, 1907–2000
- Aryika Gyanmati
- Acharya Vidyasagar, 1946–2024
- Muni Tarunsagar, 1967–2018
