= Gyanmati =

Indian Jain nun

Ganini Pramukha Aryika Shri Gyanmati
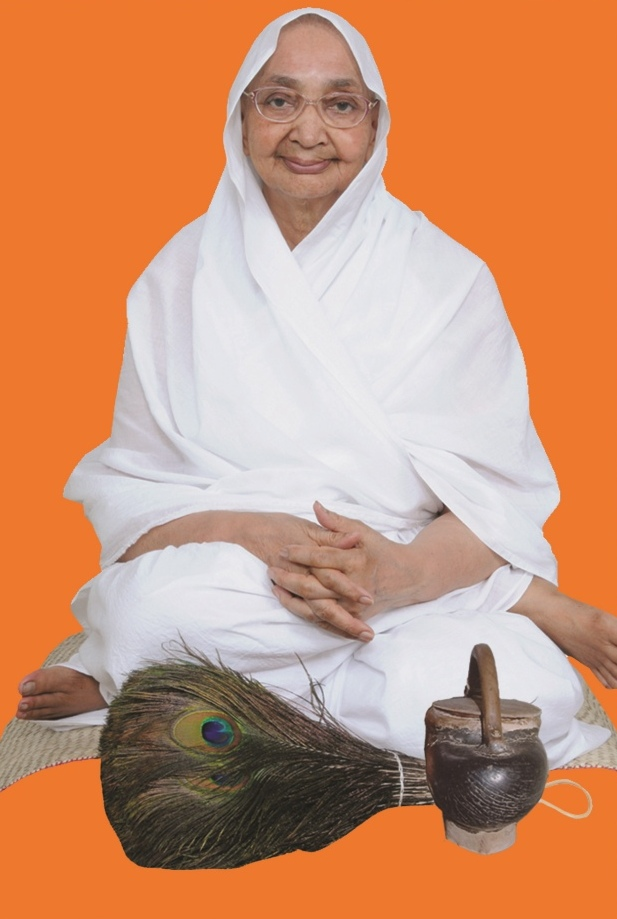

Personal life
- Born: Maina; 22 October 1934 (age 91) Barabanki district, Uttar Pradesh
- Parents: Chotteylal (father); Mohini Devi (mother)
- Website: http://jambudweep.org/

Religious life
- Religion: Jainism
- Sect: Digambara
- Initiation as Brahamcharini: 2 October 1952 (Sharad Purnima); Barabanki by Acharya Deshbhushan
- Initiation as Chullika: 1953 (Chait Krishna ekam)

Religious career
- Disciples: Aryika Chandanamti

Gyanmati Mataji (Jñānamati) is an Indian Jain religious guru Aryika (pure soul)from India. She is known for being a prolific author and the construction of several Jain temples including the Jambudweep temple complex at Hastinapur, Uttar Pradesh, Ayodya Jain Tirth and the Statue of Ahimsa at Mangi Tungi in Maharashtra.

== Early life ==
Gyanmati was born as Maina on 22 October 1934 in Tikait Nagar in Barabanki district, Uttar Pradesh, in a Jain family of Mohini Devi and Chotelal. She was influenced by Padmanandi Panchvinshatika, an ancient Jain scripture gifted by her grandparents on the marriage of her mother. On 2 October 1952, on the day of Sharad Purnima, she was initiated as a Brahmacharini at Barabanki district by the Digambara Jain acharya Deshbhushan.

== Education ==
Since her early childhood, Gyanmati started learning Sanskrit with Katantra style of linguistics or lipi generally referred as Aindra School of Grammar. She continued to research and explore with some of the Jain literature like Gommatsar, Ashtasahasri, Tattvartha Vartika (Rajvartika), Moolachar, Triloksar, Samayasāra etc. and soon expertise in Hindi, Sanskrit, Prakrit, Kannada, Marathi, Gujarati etc. Deeply into research and learning she frequently consulted senior most Acharyas, Scholars and Jain monks.

== Author ==
Gyanmati practiced her skills with writing 1008 Mantras of "Sahastranam" which improved her ability. She is considered as the first Kshullika or a Jain Sadhvi in history to translate and author several Jain literature, scriptures and manuscripts.Gyanmati translated Nyaya-Ashtasahasri a renowned Sanskrit scripture, into Hindi in the year 1969 . Since then, she had written and composed more than 450 different publications ranging from auspicious quotes and thoughts to books and volumes. She has written and published 200 major books including the first two available in both Hindi and Sanskrit translations. She has also composed the Sanskrit Teeka (commentary) of the Sutras in form of sixteen books of Shatkhandagam Grantha. She has composed a modern Rite for the Five Merus.

- She was awarded honorary degree of Doctor of Letters (D.Litt.) by Avadh University, Faizabad on 5 February 1995 for her outstanding contributions in the field of Literature.
- Organised International Vice-Chancellors Conference to present and share the facts and findings and basis of Jainism and its studies at Hastinapur on 8 October 1998.

== Initiation as Aryika ==
On the instructions of Acharya Shantisagar, she was elevated as to the rank of Aryika by Veersagar on Vaishakh Krishna Dooj of 1956 at Madhorajpura in Rajasthan.

== Construction activities ==
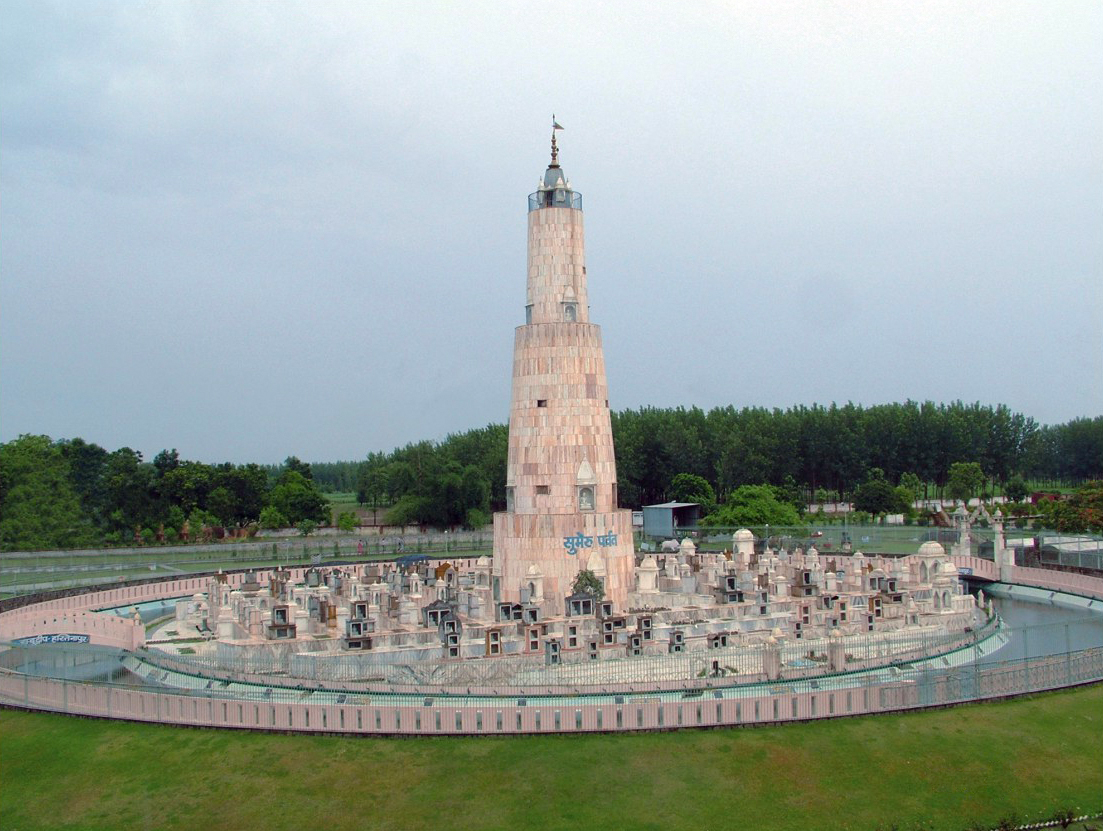
Jambudweep, Hastinapur

- She founded the Digambar Jain Institute of Cosmographic Research in 1972 with an aim of constructing a monumental model of Jambudvipa to have better understanding of Jain cosmology. It was inaugurated in 1982 and was named Jambudweep Gyan Jyoti.
- Bhagwan Rishabhdev Samavsaran Shrivihar was consecrated after the tour of the whole India in April 1998 at Kevalgyan Kalyanak temple of Deeksha Tirth-Prayag at Delhi.
- The 31 ft Statue of Vasupujya at Champapur, Bhagalpur was built under her guidance. It was consecrated in February–March 2014.
- She was an inspiration behind the 108 ft statue of Rishabhanatha at Mangi-Tungi, the tallest Jain statue in the world. This statue holds the Guinness World Record for the tallest Jain idol. The certificate was awarded to Gyanmati, Chandnamati and Ravindrakirti on 6 March 2016. The Panch Kalyanak Mahotsav was held from 11–17 February 2016.
