= Tikait =

Tikait may refer to:

- Yuvaraja (Sanskrit) or Tikait (Hindi), Indian title for a heir apparent or crown prince

Given name

- Raja Tikait Rai (1760–1808), diwan (minister) of Oudh State
- Tikait Umrao Singh, 19th century Indian ruler and freedom fighter

Surname

- Mahendra Singh Tikait (1935–2011), Indian farmer leader
- Rakesh Tikait (born 1969), Indian farm union leader

Other

- Tikait Nagar, a town in Uttar Pradesh, India
