= Statue of Vasupujya =

Colossal Jain statue in India

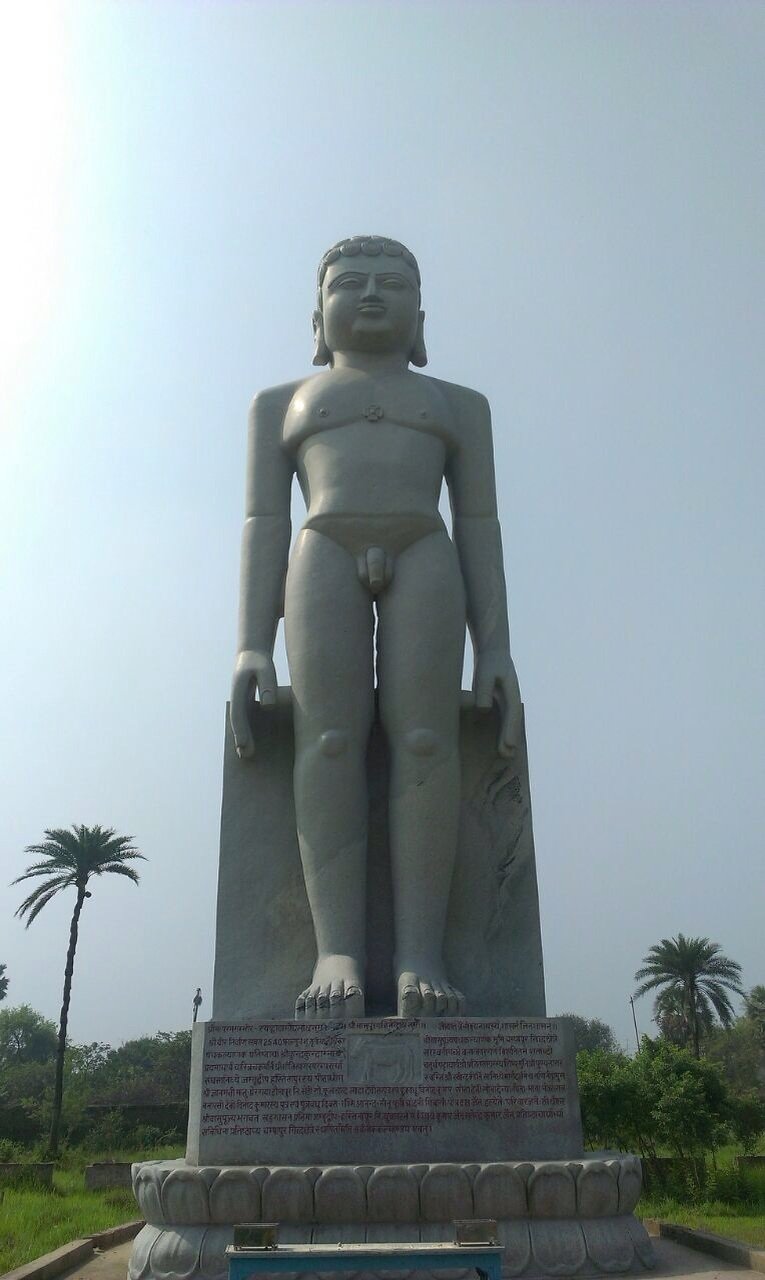
- The 31ft high "Statue of Vasupujya" at Champapur, Bihar

- Location within Bihar

Religion
- Affiliation: Jainism
- Deity: Vasupujya

Location
- Location: Champapuri, Bhagalpur, Bihar
- Coordinates: 25°15′N 87°0′E

The Statue of Vasupujya located at Champapur, Bhagalpur in the Indian state of Bihar, is one of the tallest statues in eastern India and the tallest statue of Lord Vasupujya in India. The statue is dedicated to Vasupujya, the twelfth Jain Tirthankara of the present cosmic age. The height of the statue is 31 ft. The statue was constructed and donated by Smt Sona Devi Sethi Charitable trust. Champapur is a Siddhakshetra and occupies a very significant place among the Jains. This is said to be the place where all the five kalyanaks (five auspicious events)- Garbh, Janam, Diksha, Kevalgyana and Moksh kalyanak of Tirthankara Vasupujya took place. It is said that the first tirthankar Rishabha, twenty-third Tirthankara Parshvanath and last tirthankara Mahavira had their Chaturmas (monsoon stay) at this place. Mahavira had his third and twelfth Chaturmas at this place.

== Early Stages ==
The stone for the statue was brought all the way from Koyra mines in Karnataka to Champapur in Bihar. The original stone weighed over 100 tonnes and was brought by road.

=== Bhoomi Pujan ===
The Bhoomi Pujan was done in June 2012.

=== Carving of the statue ===
The carving of the statue was done immaculately by Jagdish Sharma & Co, including Mithalal and Surendra Kumar, sculptors from Rajasthan, in Champapur itself. The carving was completed in about 14 months.

== Erection of the statue ==
The statue was lifted with the help of two cranes which were brought from nearby states.

== Panch Kalyanak Mahotsav ==
The Panch Kalyanaka Pratistha Mahotsav of the statue was held from 27 February 2014 to 3 March 2014. The Pancha Kalyanak Pratistha Mahotsav was conducted by Muni Shri 108 Shri Punya Sagarji Maharaj, Peethadeesh Swami Shri Ravindra Keertiji with the blessings of Ganini 105 Shri Gyanmati Mataji, a disciple of 108 Shri Shantisagar ji Maharaj and Acharya Shri 108 Vardhmansagar ji Maharaj.The chief Pratishtachari(Priest) of the Panch Kalyanak was Shri Vijay Kumar Jain. The Suri Mantra was said by Muni Shree 108 Shri Punya Sagarji Maharaj. The first ever Mahamastakabhisek of the statue was performed on 3 March 2014.

== Gallery ==
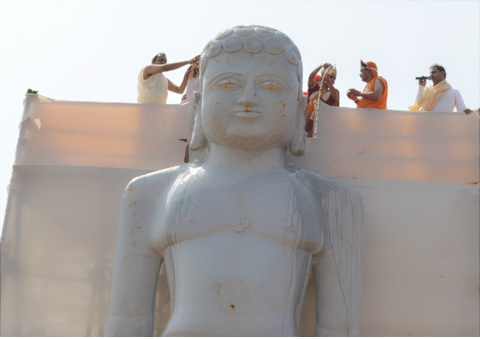
Statue of Lord Vasupujya, Champapur

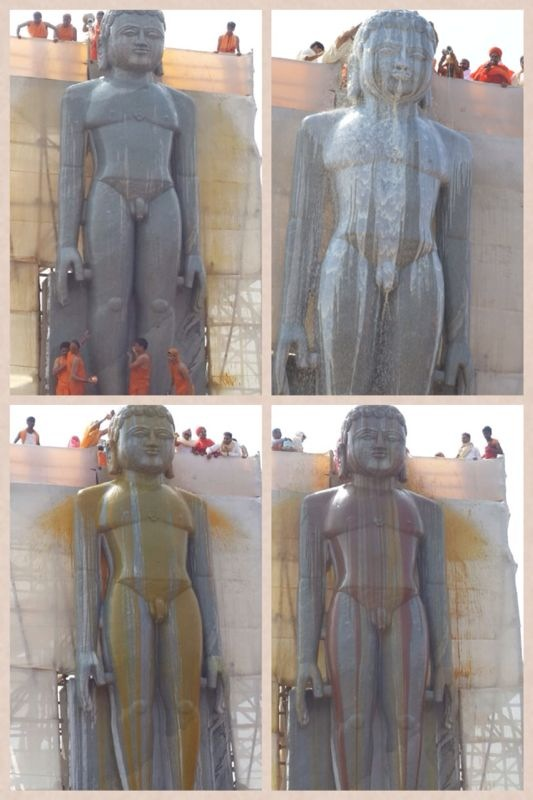
First ever Panchamrit Mahamastakabhishek of the statue on 3 March 2014

== See also ==
- God in Jainism
- Arihant (Jainism)
- Jainism and non-creationism
- Vasupujya
