= Statue of Ahimsa =

Jain idol in Mangi-Tungi, India

- ऋषभदेव मूर्ति
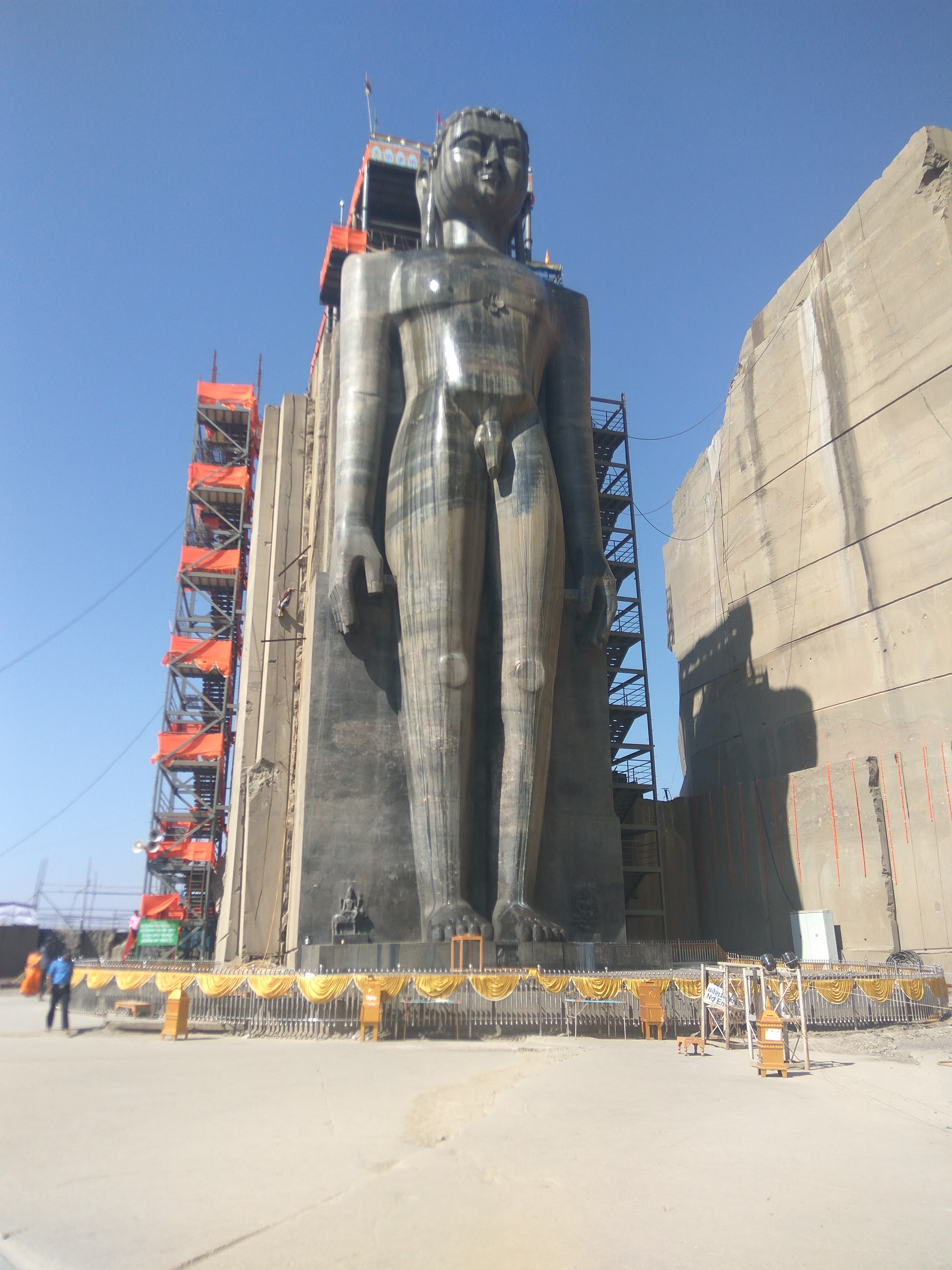

- Statue of Ahimsa

Religion
- Affiliation: Jainism
- District: Nashik
- Deity: Rishabhanatha
- Festival: Mahamastakabhisheka

Location
- Location: Tahrabad, Mangi Tungi
- State: Maharashtra
- Coordinates: 20°50′33″N 74°05′05″E

Architecture
- Creator: Gyanmati Mataji
- Established: 2002
- Completed: 2016
- Elevation: 1,324 m (4,344 ft)

Website
- mangitungi108ftidol.com

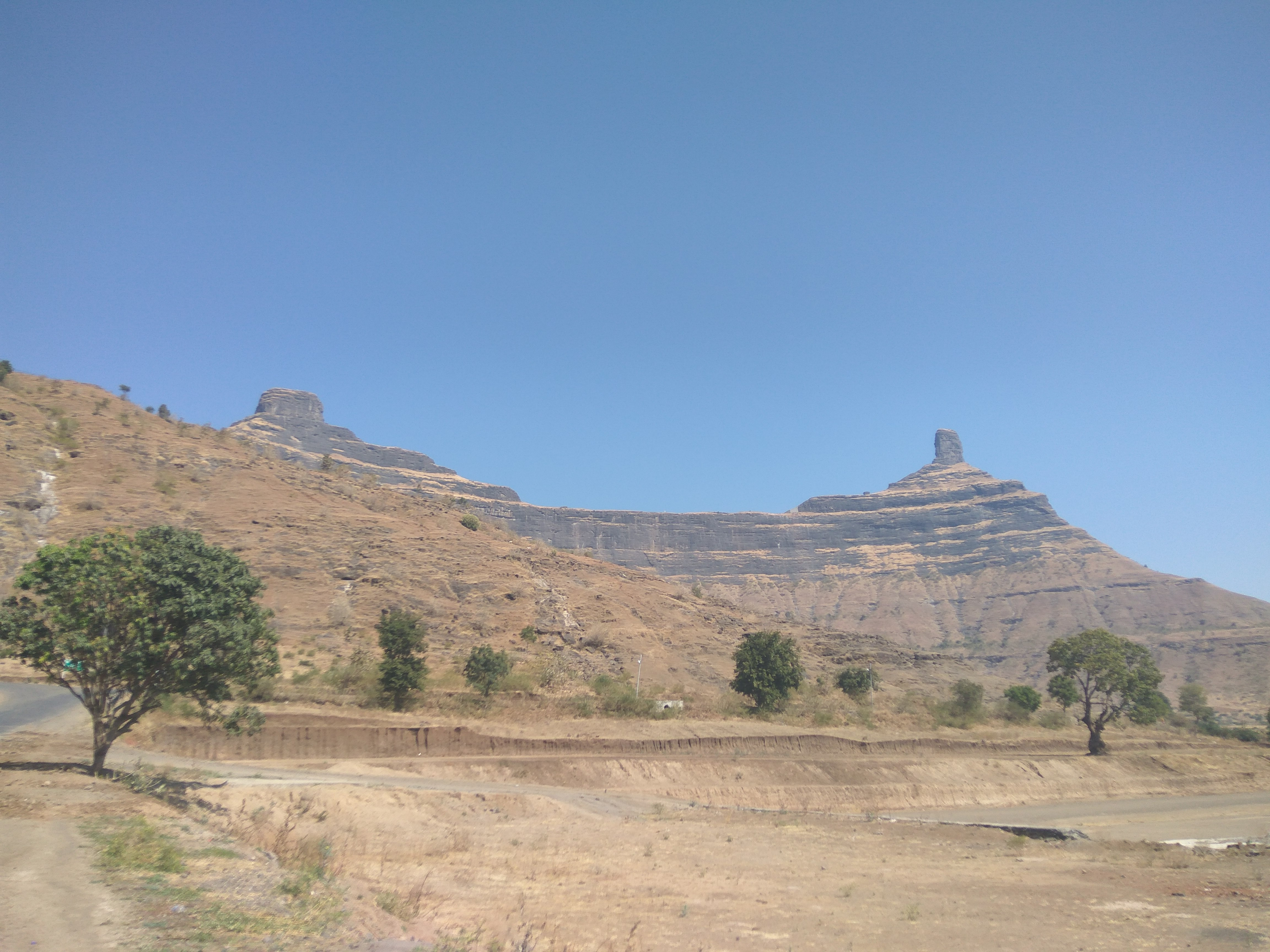
Mangi Tungi Hill

The Statue of Ahimsa is located at Mangi-Tungi, in Nashik, in the Indian state of Maharashtra. It is the tallest monolithic and tallest Jain statue in the world. The statue depicts the first Jain Tirthankara, Rishabhanatha. The statue is 108 feet (33 m) tall – 121 feet (37 m) including pedestal. The statue has been carved out of the Mangi-Tungi hills, which are considered to be sacred by the Jains.

The statue was built by the inspiration of the Jain nun (Aryika) Gyanmati, and under the guidance of Aryika Chandanamati. The project was chaired and directed by Raveendra Kirti. The construction of the statue started in 2002 under the guidance of Chief Secretary Pannalalji Papdiwal and Chief engineer C. R. Patil working president Anil Jain-Delhi. It was completed on 24 January 2016 (Tithi-Magh Krishna Ekam). The statue was sculpted by Moolchand Ramchand Nahata Firm.

== History ==
The inspiration of the idol was given by the Jain nun Gyanmati in 1996. Shilapujan (foundation stone laying ceremony) was done in 2002. More than 10,000 truck loads of rock material was carved out for the purpose.

The Mangi Tungi hills are one of the four siddha kshetras for the Jain community in Maharashtra. The hills are an important pilgrimage for the Jains, especially the local population of Marathi Jains and Gujarati Jains. There are several Jain temples at the pinnacles and at the base of the hills.

== Statue ==
The image of Rishabhanatha, carved out of a single rock, is 108 feet (33 m) tall (121 feet (37 m) including pedestal), 1840 sq feet in size, and weighs 8712 tonne. It is said to be the world's tallest Jain idol. It is located 4,343 feet (1,324 m) above sea level, near Mangi-Tungi hills in Baglan taluka. Officials from the Guinness Book of World Records visited Mangi Tungi in 2016 and awarded the engineer of the 108 ft tall Rishabhdeva statue, C R Patil, the official certificate for the world's tallest Jain idol.

== Premises ==
The rural development department, led by minister Pankaja Munde, approved the initial funds of ₹18.5 crore (US$1.9 million) for the civil work in the temple area spread over 100 acres.

== Panch Kalyanak Mahotsav ==
The Panch Kalyanaka Pratistha Mahotsav of the statue was held from 11 February 2016 to 17 February 2016 at Mangi Tungi. A number of measures were taken by the local administration to deal with the expected rise in pilgrim numbers.

The Chief Minister of Maharashtra had promised several development initiatives, that were likely to be undertaken by the Maharashtra Tourism Development Corporation. There were challenges getting water from the Haranbari dam at estimated cost of ₹3 crore (US$310,000).

The Bhartiya Janata Party president, Amit Shah & Maharashtra's Chief Minister Devendra Fadnavis along with Maharashtra's Rural Development Minister Pankaja Munde visited the festival on 13 February 2016.

Around 5000 couples and their 18000 family members participated in the rituals of the Panchkalyanak Mahotsav. More than 100 Jain Munis and Aryikas participated in the event.

== Mahamastakabhishek ==
The first Mahamastakabhishek of the statue was held on 18 February 2016. The first Abhishek was performed by Shri Kamal Kumar Jain from Ara(Bihar), followed by Shri Suresh Jain of Teerthankar Mahavir University and Padma Bhushan Shri Veerendra Heggade of Dharamsthala. Other devotees like Shri Pannalal ji Papdiwal, Shri Binod Kumar Sethi of Dimapur and many more also got the privilege of performing the Abhishek on the first day. Panchamrit Abhishek was performed using milk, flowers, orange juice, sugar cane juice, water, saffron etc.

== Gallery ==
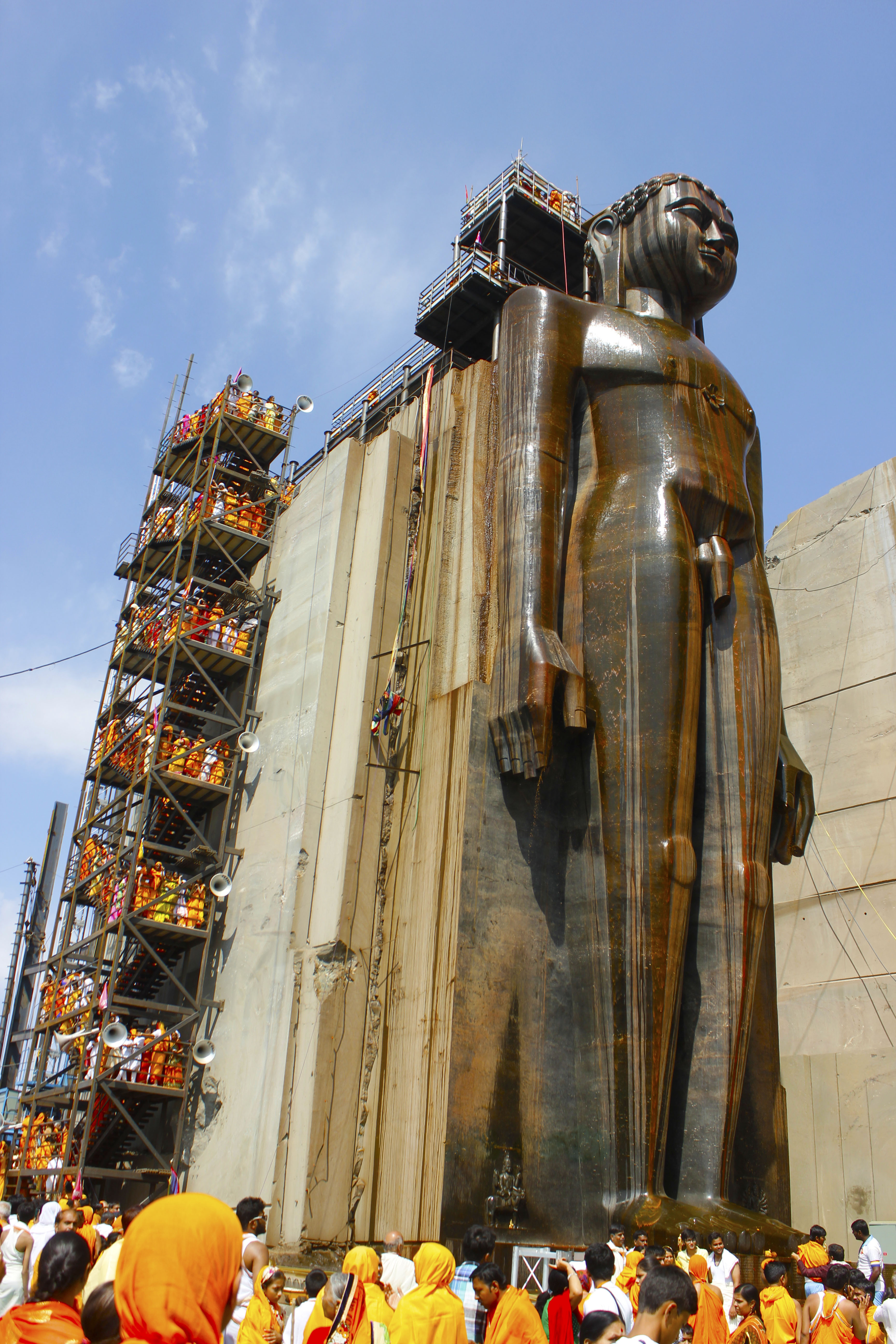
Panchamrit Abhishek of Statue of Ahimsa

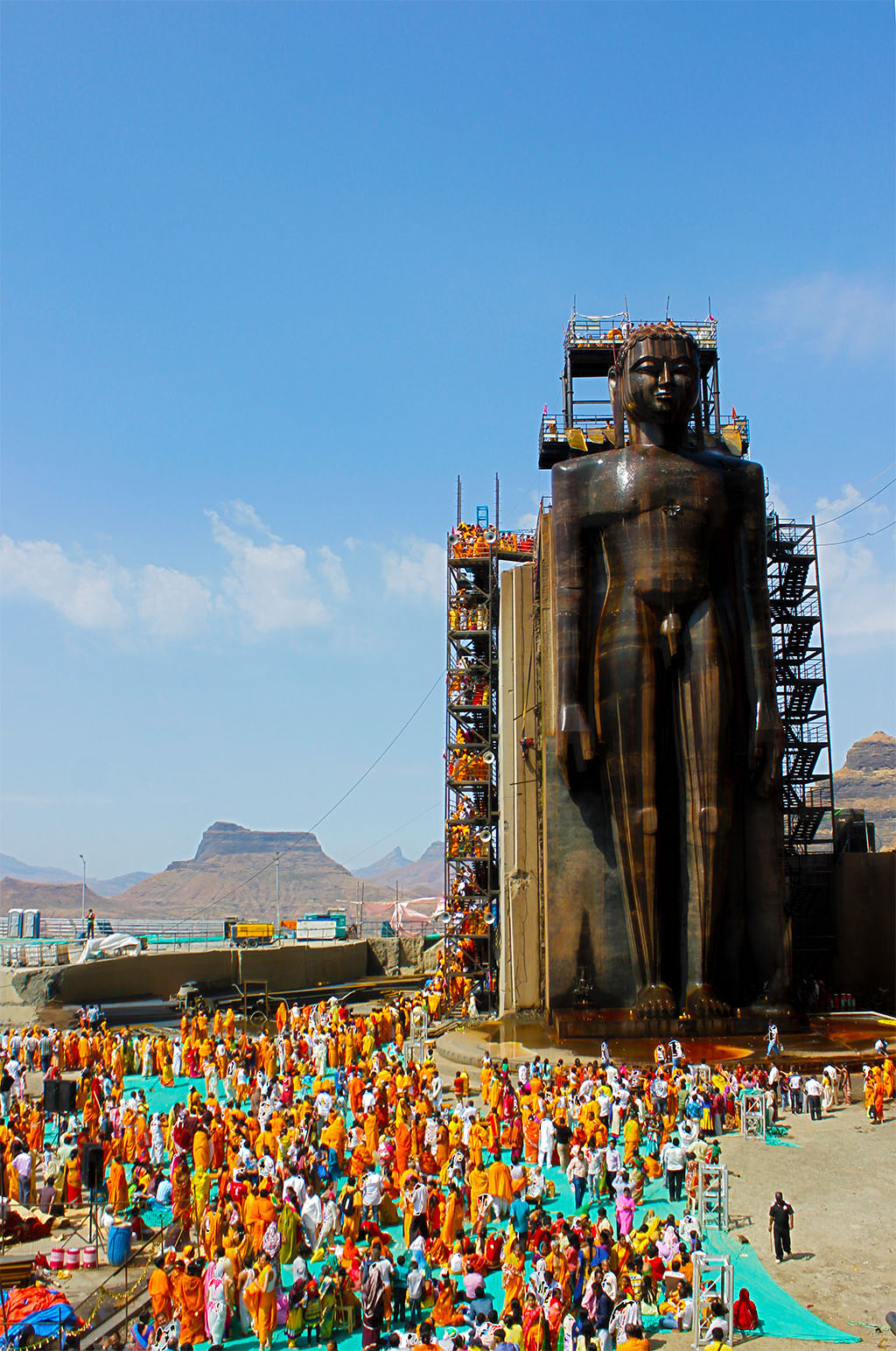
Panchamrit Abhishek of Statue of Ahimsa

== See also ==
- Gommateshwara statue
- Bawangaja
- Jainism in Maharashtra
- Jainism in North Karnataka
- Statue of Vasupujya
- List of largest monoliths
