= Jambudweep =

Jain temple in Hastinapur, Uttar Pradesh, India

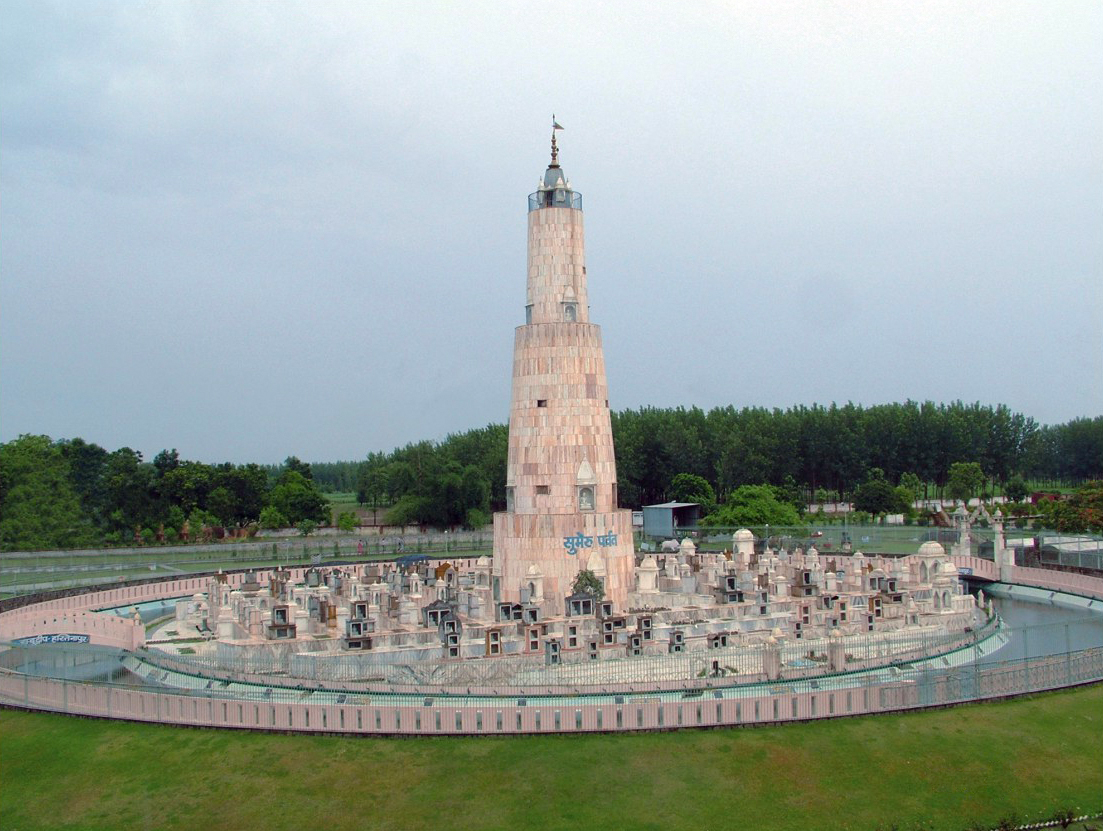
- Depiction of Mount Sumeru at Jambudweep

- Location within Uttar Pradesh

Religion
- Affiliation: Jainism
- Deity: Tirthankara

Location
- Location: Hastinapur, Uttar Pradesh, India
- Coordinates: 29°09′56.7″N 78°00′24.4″E

Architecture
- Creator: Gyanmati Mataji
- Established: 1972

Website
- www.jambudweep.org

Jambudweep is a Digambara Jain temple in Hastinapur, Uttar Pradesh built by the Jain nun Gyanmati in 1972. Jambudweep is a depiction of Jain cosmology Jambudvipa.

== About ==
Jambudweep was founded by Gyanmati in 1972 and the model of Jambudvipa was completed in 1985. For the tirtha, Nalini Balbir reported

The main attraction of this vast campus is the Jambudvipa. By its height, this original construction dominates all other buildings. It is meant both for education of the believers, since it shows them the Jaina representation of the universe, and for their entertainment. One can climb to the top by an inner staircase, or go boating around the Lavanasamudra!

— Nalini Balbir

The Jambudweep model of Jain cosmology was designed under the supervision of Gyanmati in 1985. Circular structures of Jain cosmology 'Jambudweep' has been constructed with white & coloured marble stones in the diameter of 250 feet (76 m) with 101 feet (31 m) tall Mount Sumeru is built in light pink marble in the center of Jambudweep.

The fundamental idea behind this temple is to connect devotional temple visit with religious adventure and educate devotees about the Jain cosmology. The official name of the tirtha is the Digambar Jain Institute of Cosmographic Research (Digambar Jain Trilok Shodh Sansthan) and its main attraction is the building constructed as a model of Jambudvipa.

== Story ==
According to accounts associated with the project, in 1965, during the Chaturmas period at Shravanabelagola in Karnataka, Gyanmati Mataji conceived the idea of constructing a physical representation of the Jain cosmological universe described in Jain Scriptures. She subsequently studied ancient Jain texts, including the Tiloyapannatti and Trilokasara, as the basis for developing the project.

Hastinapur was selected as the site for the construction. The Digambara Jain Trilok Shodh Sansthan was established in 1972, and the principal Jambudweep structure was completed in 1985. The complex was designed to present Jain cosmological concepts through three-dimensional architectural representations.

Jambudweep developed a website https://www.jambudweep.org in 2007 to spread the Jain philosophy online, with more than 2000 books uploaded.

== Jambudvipa and Jain cosmology ==
In Jain cosmology, Jambudweep is the central continent of Madhyaloka, the middle world of the universe. According to the Jain texts described in the project, Jambudweep has a circular form and an extent of 100,000 yojanas, with Mount Sameru situated at the centre.

Jambudweep is divided into seven regions by six mountain ranges known as Kulachalas. These regions are Bharat, Haimavat, Hari, Videha, Ramyaka, Hairanyavat and Airavata. The six mountain ranges are Himavan, Mahahimavan, Nishadha, Neela, Rukmi and Shikhari.

The cosmological descriptions also include six lakes associated with the mountain ranges and fourteen great rivers flowing through the seven regions. The Bharat region is described in Jain cosmology as the region in which the present cycle's Tirthankaras are born.

== Main temples ==
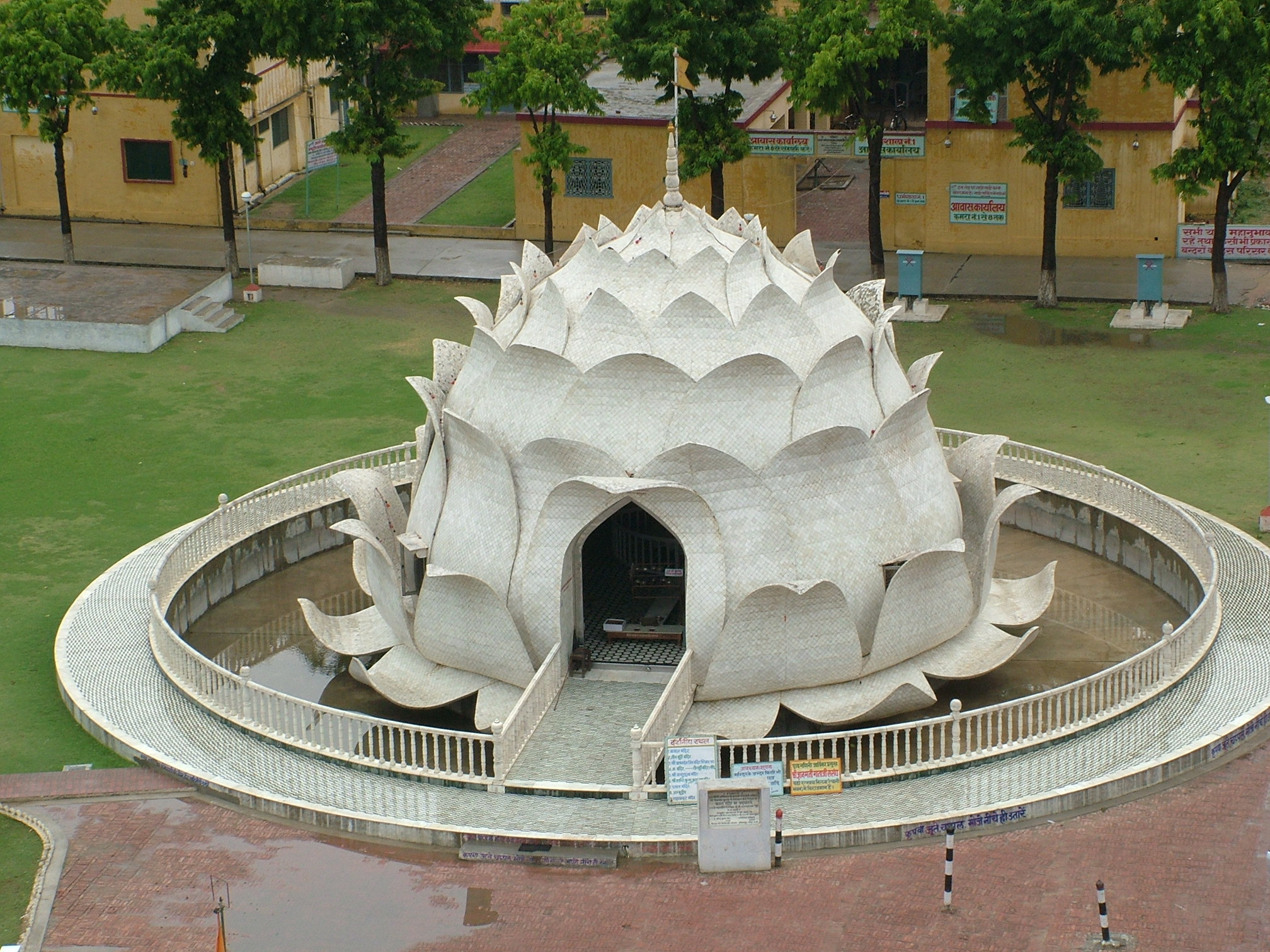
Lotus Temple

The premises has various Jain temples which includes Sumeru Parvat, Lotus Temple, Teen Murti Mandir, Meditation Temple, Badi Murti, Teen Lok Rachna and many other tourist attractions. The main temples in the Jambudweep complex includes:

=== Mount Sumeru ===
Mount Sumeru, also known as Sudarshan Meru, occupies the centre of Jambudvipa in Jain cosmology. The Jambudweep complex at Hastinapur contains a 101-foot-high representation of the mountain.

According to the Jain cosmological description at the complex, Mount Sumeru has four principal forest regions: Bhadrashala, Nandan, Saumanas and Panduk. The model also represents the religious significance of Panduk Forest, where the birth consecration of Tirthankaras is described in Jain tradition as taking place.

The complex further includes representations of the four Gajdanta mountains: Saumanas, Vidyutprabha, Gandhamadana and Malyavan.

=== Terah Dweep Temple ===
The Terah Dweep Temple represents the thirteen islands and twelve oceans described in Digambara Jain cosmology. According to the material associated with the complex, the model includes 458 miniature Jain temples, 170 Samavasarana structures and a total of 2,127 Jain images, along with representations of Mountains, rivers, oceans and other cosmological features.

The structure is intended to illustrate the arrangement of the islands and oceans around Jambudweep and the place of Mount Sumeru within the Jain cosmological system.

=== Trilok Structure ===
The Trilok representation illustrates the three principal divisions of the Jain universe: Adholoka, Madhyaloka and Urdhvaloka.

Adholoka is described as the lower world, containing seven infernal regions. Madhyaloka is the middle world, associated with human beings, animals and other forms of terrestrial life. Urdhavaloka is the upper world, which includes the abodes of various classes of celestial beings.

At the highest part of the universe is Siddhashila, the abode of liberated souls according to Jain doctrine. The Trilok structure at Hastinapur presents these divisions through a physical model.

=== Sahastrakut Jinalya ===
Sahastrakut Jinalya is notable for a panel depicting Jain monk in worship room praying to tirthankara. The panel was discovered buried where Sahastrakut Jinalya constructed.

=== Lotus temple ===
Lotus temple a small temple in the courtyard of Jambudweep. It is a Jain House of Worship and also a prominent attraction in Hastinapur. It was completed in 1989.

=== Tera-dvipa ===
Tera-dvipa is modeled after group of thirteen islands of the middle section of the universe in Jain cosmology. The structure features fived Mt. Meru, three islands where human and Jinas are born, the Jambudweep is situated in innermost circle and eight islands depicts nandishvar dweepa. The eight islands of nandishvar dweepa are connected to ashtanika, the eight day festival.

== Gallery ==
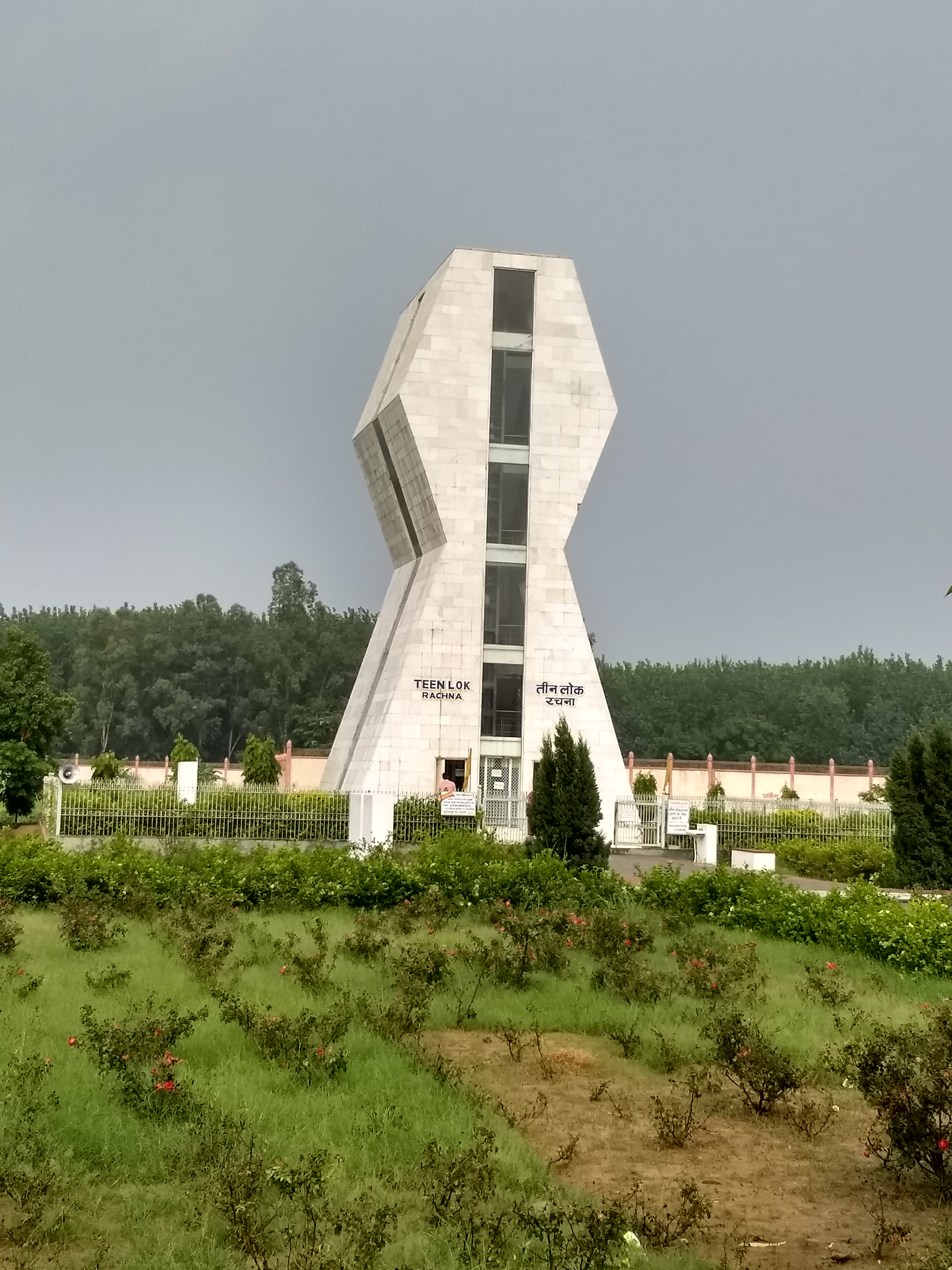
Teen lok Rachna

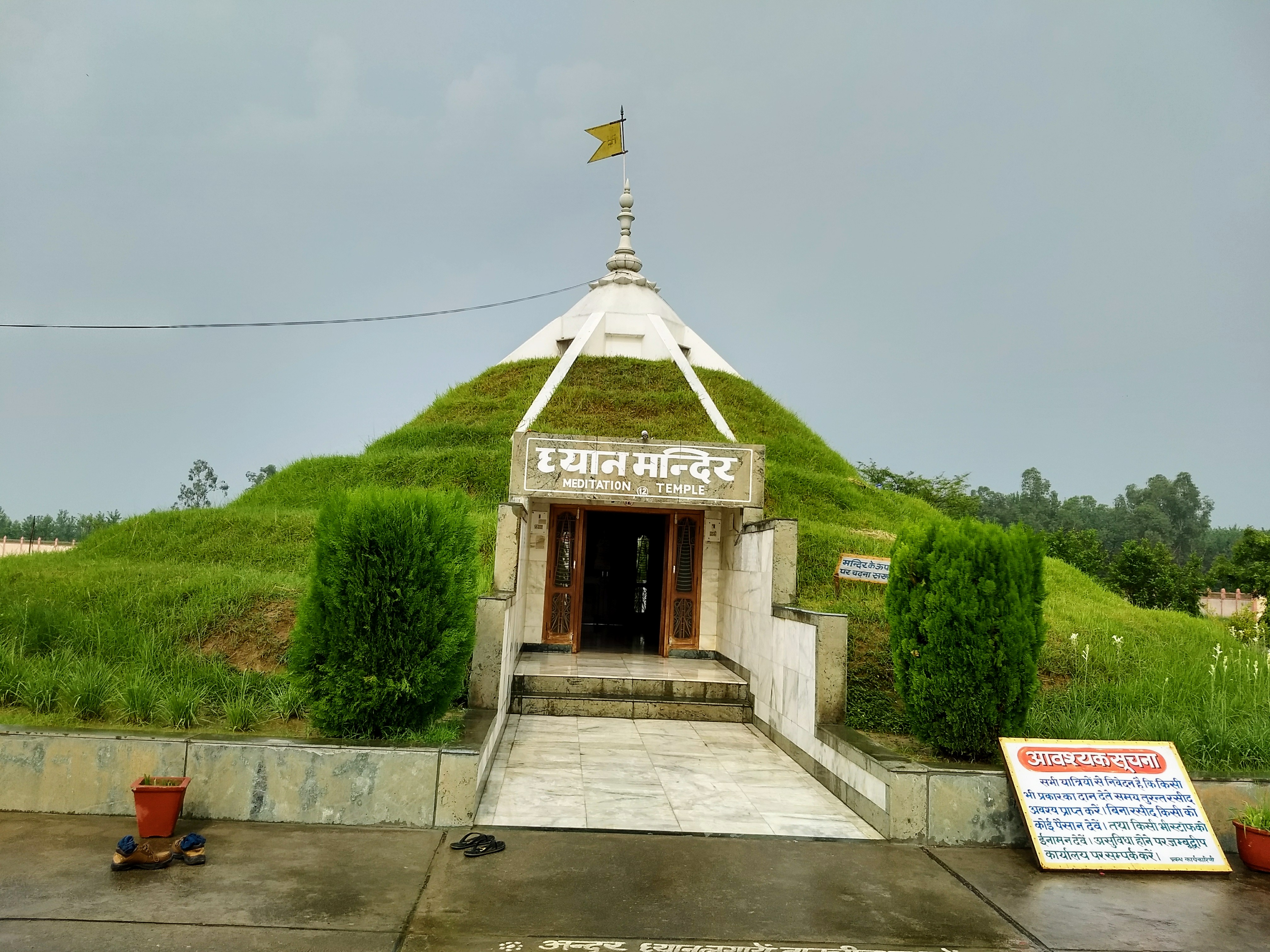
Dhyaan Mandir

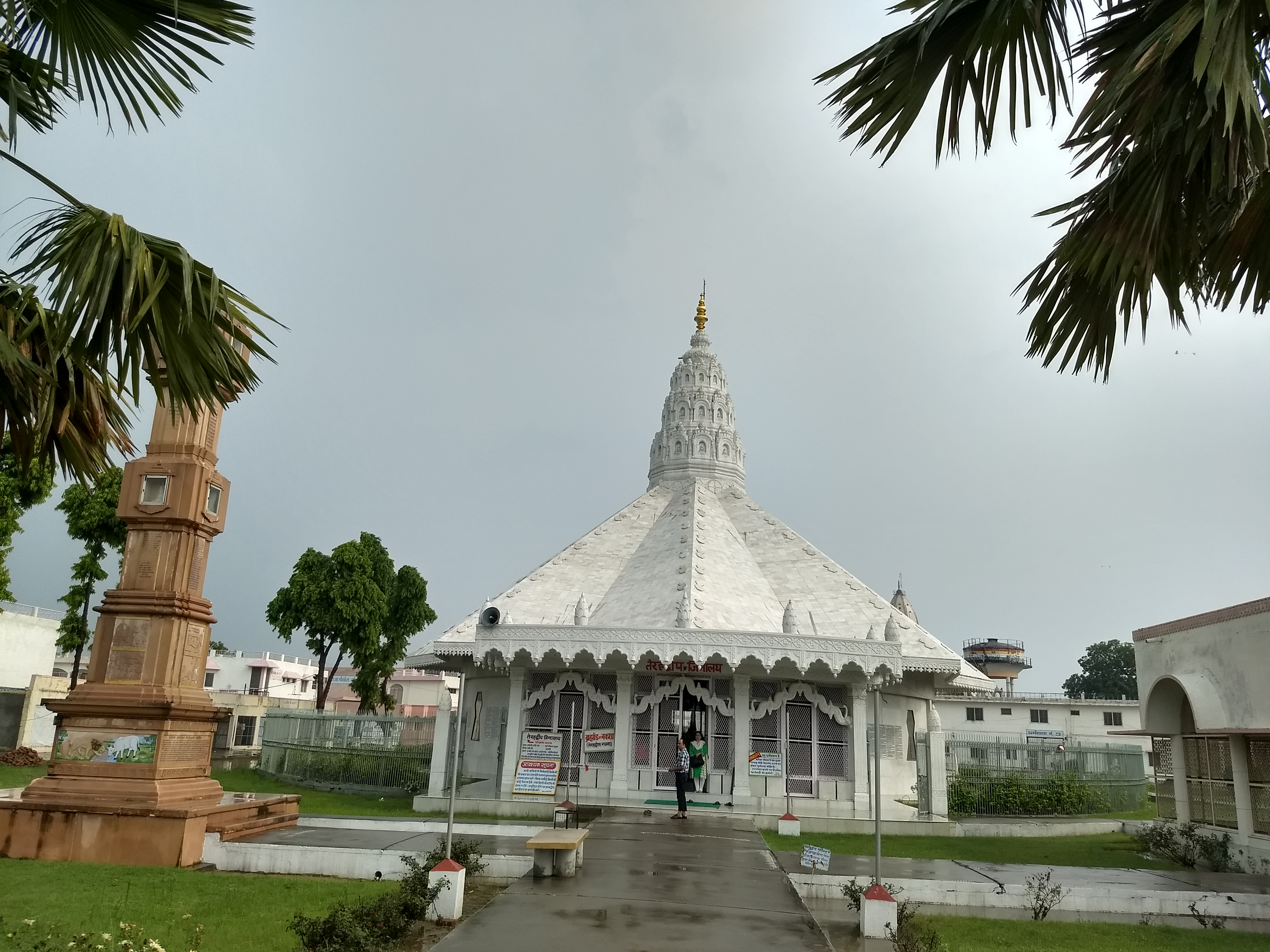
Tairah dweep jinalya

== See also ==
- Hastinapur
- Prachin Bada Mandir
- Kailash Parvat Rachna
- Shree Ashtapad Teerth
