= Deshbhushan =

Acharya Shri Deshbhushan Ji Maharaj
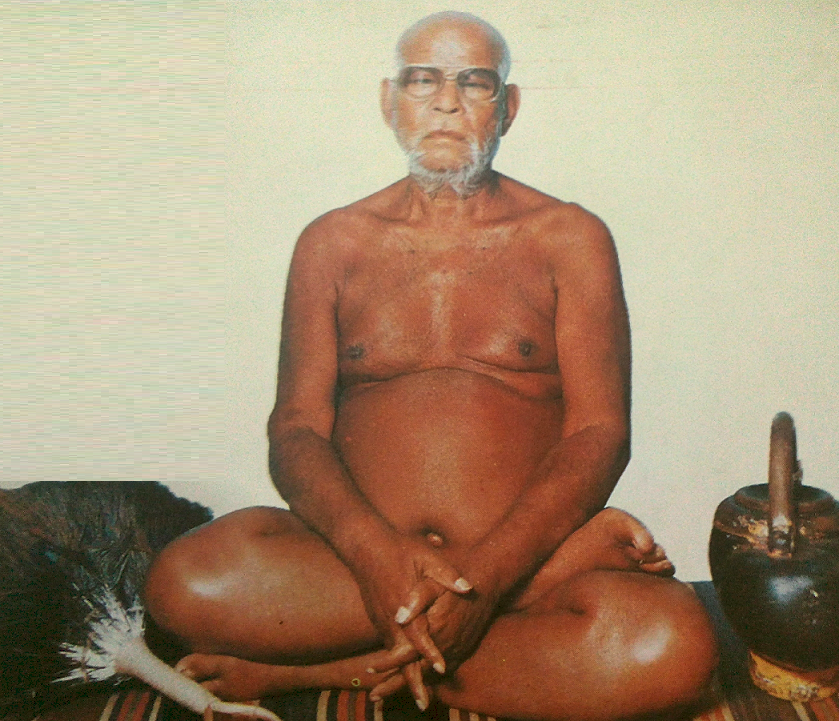
- Acharya Shri Deshbhushan ji

Personal life
- Born: Balagauda; 1905 Kothali, Karnataka
- Died: 28 May 1987 (aged 81) Kothali, Karnataka
- Parents: Satyagauda (father); Akka Devi (mother)

Religious life
- Religion: Jainism
- Sect: Digambara
- Initiation: 1936; Kunthalgiri, Maharashtra by Acharya Jaikirti ji

Religious career
- Successor: Acharya Vidyananda
- Ascetics initiated: Acharya Vidyananda

Acharya Deshbhushan (Hindi: आचार्य देशभूषण) was a Digambara Jain Acharya of 20th century who composed and translated many Kannada scriptures to Hindi and Sanskrit. He initiated and elevated several Jain monks and nuns like Shwetpichhi Acharya Vidyananda ji and Gyanmati Mataji. He is renowned for his remarkable translations of Kannada scriptures to Sanskrit and Hindi. He is the first Digambara Acharya to visit and address the Indian Parliament in the year 1974 along with the Prime Minister Indira Gandhi.

== Early life ==
Born on Mārgaśirṣa Śukla Pakṣa Pratipat of the year 1905 in Kothli district of Belgaum, Karnataka in a wealthy landlords family of Sh. Satya Gauda and Akka Devi Patil (Parents), Sh. Bala Gauda Patil (Balappa) completed his primary and secondary education in Hindi, English, Marathi and Kannada medium at Sadalga and Secondary Education at Gilginchi Artal High School, Belagavi with his best friend Dr. A.N. Upadhye. Both went on to receive their Bachelor of Arts with Honours from Bombay University in Sanskrit and Prakrit languages and later moved to Pune for Post-Graduation and joined Bhandarkar Oriental Research Institute. At this point while Sh. A.N. Upadhye decided to join as lecturer of Prakrit at Rajaram College, Kolhapur to meet up the social and financial obligations. Bala Gauda decided to continue his further research with the help of original references which were kept intact in the custody of Jain Temples where he came in contact with Acharya Jayakirti and got deeply influenced by his lectures.

== Religious career ==
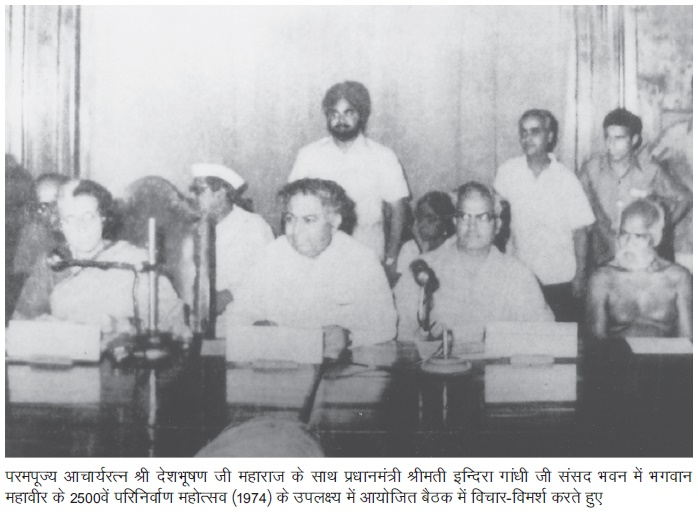
Acharya Deshbhusan (right) with prime Minister Indira Gandhi (left) at Indian parliament in 1974

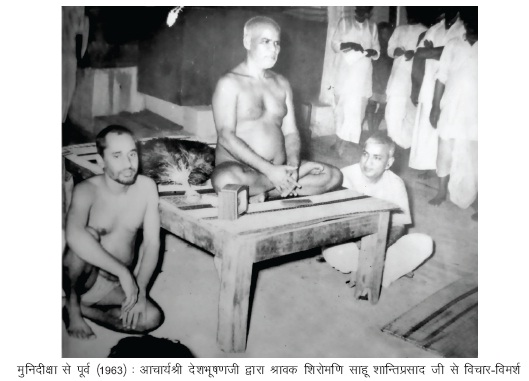
Acharya Deshbhusan Parshvakirti

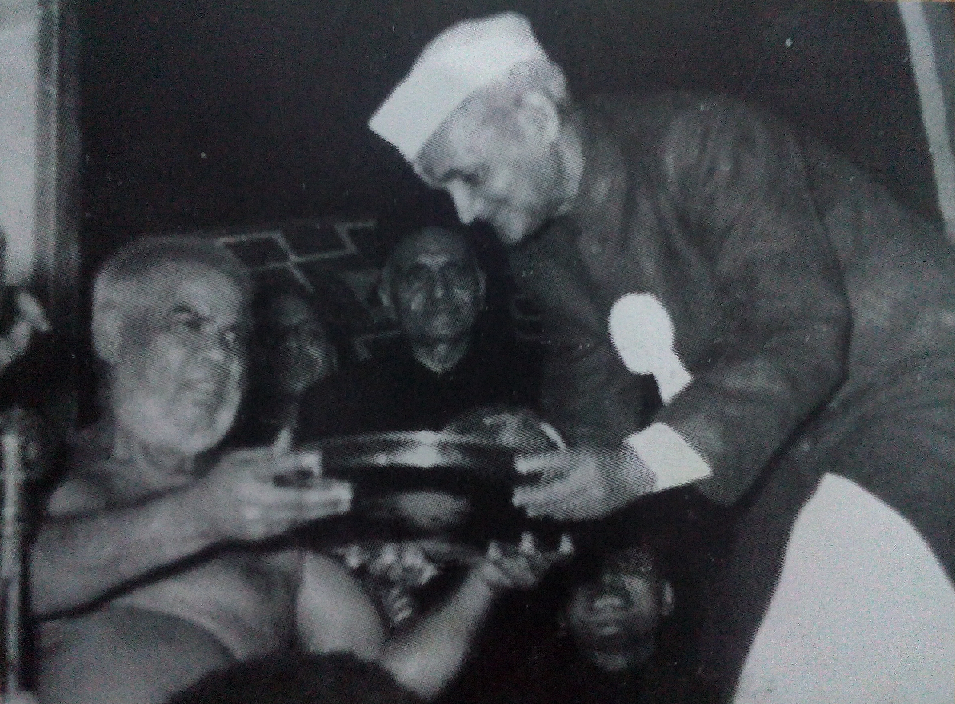
Acharya Deshbhushan (left) and Prime Minister Lal Bahadur Shastri (right)

Influenced by Acharya Jayakirti, Bala Gauda requested him to join his group or Jain Sangha. Looking at his young age and family background Acharya explained to him about the traditional way of learning with the Pratimas or the vows which every student has to practice and follow in order to get associated with them. Observing his determination and zeal towards his quest for the right knowledge as per Jain philosophy Acharya Jayakirti initiated him as Ailak or individual researcher to be known as Ailak Deshbhushan in the early 1930s and kept him under observation to be elevated as a Jain Muni. Ultimately, after six years of strict observations under his Jain Sangha. Acharya Jayakirti elevated and initiated him as Muni Deshbhushan on 8 March 1936 at the famous Kunthalgiri Jain temple in Maharashtra to further research and explore his ultimate quest for the right wisdom.

Entire Jain community unanimously entitled him as Samayaktva Chudamani Acharya Ratna Shri Deshbhushan ji Muni Maharaja on the event of successfully organizing and conducting the Mahamastakabhisheka at Shravanabelagola in the year 1981. Entire Jain community around Delhi organized a huge event under the banner of Delhi Jain Samaj and entitled him as Acharya Ratna Deshbhushan ji Muni Maharaja in the year 1961. He was entitled as Acharya Shri Deshbhushan ji Muni Maharaja by Acharya Shri PaayaSagar ji Muni Maharaja under the guidance of Chatuh Sangha in the year 1948 during a huge event organised at Surat in Gujarat. He was initiated as Shri Deshbhushan ji Muni Maharaja by Acahrya Shri JayaKirti ji Muniraj on 8 March 1936 at Shri Digambra Jain Siddha Kshetra located at Kunthalgiri, Maharashtra.

He had initiated and elevated some of the most prominent of Jain monks and Nuns including Acharya Vidyananda and Ganini Pramukha Aryika Gyanmati Mataji. He gave the title of Upadhyaya (Preceptor) to Muni Vidyananda on 17 November 1974 in Delhi. He further elevated Upadhyaya Vidyananda to Acharya (Chief Preceptor) Vidyananda on 28 June 1987.

Deshbhushan urged for the establishment of Chulagiri in 1953. Acharya Deshbhushan Ayurvedic Medical College, Shamanewadi, Karnataka was inaugurated on 13 June 1951.
