= Mangi-Tungi =

Twin-pinnacled peak in Maharashtra, India

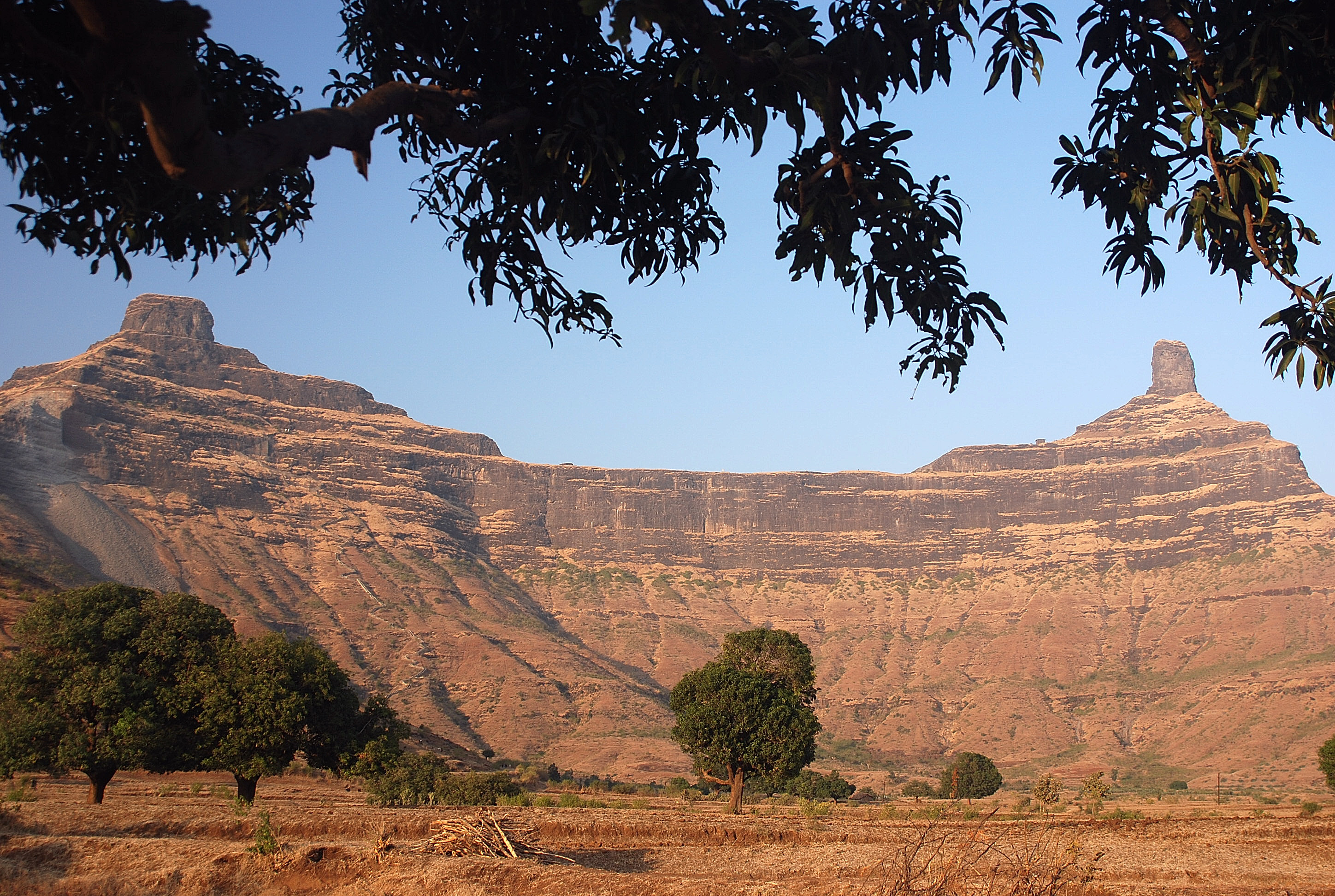
- Mangi Tungi tirtha

- Location within Maharashtra

Religion
- Affiliation: Jainism
- Sect: Digambara
- District: Nashik
- Festival: Mahavir Janma Kalyanak

Location
- Location: Taharabad
- State: Maharashtra
- Coordinates: 20°50′32″N 74°05′04″E

Architecture
- Elevation: 1,331 m (4,367 ft)

Mangi-Tungi is a prominent twin-pinnacled peak and Digambar Jain Pilgrimage Site, located near Tahrabad about 125 km from Nashik, Maharashtra, India. Mangi, 4,343 ft (1,324 m) high above sea level, is the western pinnacle and Tungi, 4,366 ft (1,331 m) high, the eastern. Mangi-Tungi is 30 km (19 mi) from the city of Satana.

== Overview ==
There are numerous temples and is considered sacred in Jainism. It enshrines images of Tirthankaras in several postures including Padmasana and kayotsarga. Sometimes, it is described as Siddha Kshetra, meaning a gateway to the state of enlightenment.

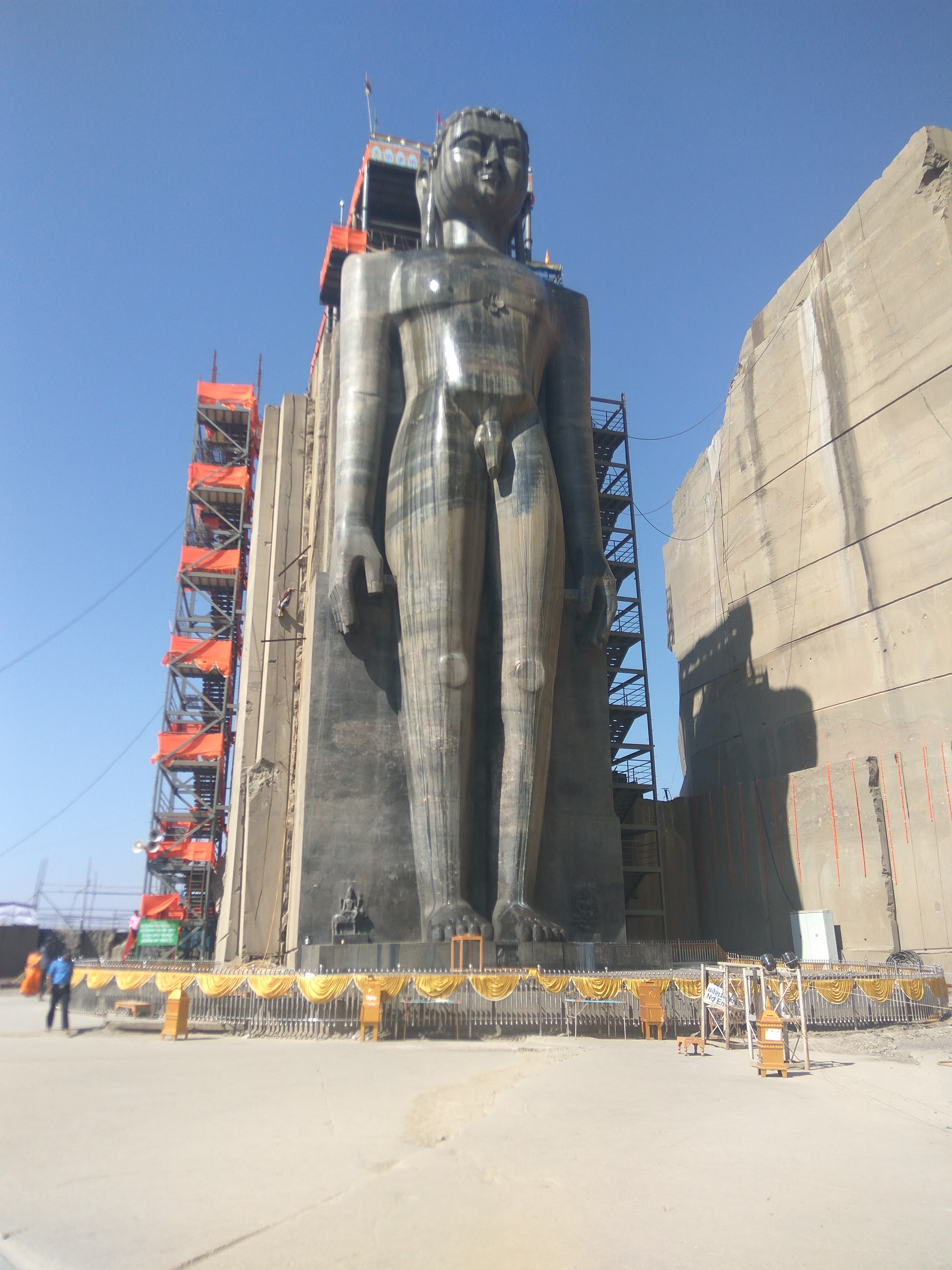
108 feet Rishabdev Bhagwan at Mangi Tungi

Around 3,500 (7,000 Up & Down) steps lead to the foot of the peak, which is enriched with several monuments of historical and religious prominence. Besides, there are numerous caves named after great Tirthankaras such as Mahavira, Rishabhanatha, Shantinatha and Parshvanatha. A grand fair is held here annually during Kartik (September–October) where people visit in large numbers to witness festival.

There are many inscriptions on idols, most of them are not clear due to deterioration with time. Many idol installed in 595 CE(V.S. 651) are here. Many inscriptions on rocks of the Adinatha and Shantinatha caves here are in Sanskrit Language.

In February 2016, The Statue of Ahimsa, a 108 ft idol carved in monolithic stone was consecrated here. It is recorded in the Guinness Book of World Records as the tallest Jain idol in the world.

== Mangi Giri ==
There are seven old temples on this hill and many images of 'charanas' (feet) of saints are installed here. according to Jain religion There is pond named Krishna Kund, which is said to be a witness of the last days of Lord Krishna. According to texts, elder brother of lord Krishna, Balram also practiced salvation and achieved heaven. Here is a Cave named Balbhadra Cave where idols of Balram and many others are installed.

== Tungi Giri ==
There are five temples on it. There are two caves named on Bhagwan Chandraprabhu, the 8th Tirthankara, and other is Ram Chandra Cave. Ancient idols of Hanuman, Gava, Gavaksha, Neel etc. are here. In one cave there is an idol of Ram's chief of army Kritantvakra in the stage of ascetic saint. On the path between Mangi & Tungi Hills, there are two Caves of Shuddha & Buddha Munies (ascetic saints). a Colossus of Bhagwan Munisuvrat Nath is here in Padmasana posture. Lord Bahubali and other's idols are also here.

== Beliefs of Jainism ==
Ram and Hanuman attained Moksh from Mount Mangitungi and are enjoying perfect bliss of the Siddha. It is learnt from the Nirvanakand that Ram, Hanuman, Sugriva, Sudeel, Gavya, Gavaakhyha, Nila, Mahaneel and ninety-nine crore monks attained Moksha from Mangitungi, which is a place of worship for Jain followers.

Depictions of deities can be found on both hills as stone carvings. These can include Yakshas, Yakshinis (attendants of the Tirthankaras) and Indra.

== 108 feet Rishabhdev Statue ft Jain Idol of Rishabhdev Bhagwan ==
Lord Rishabhanatha is believed to be the first Tirthankara in Jainism. In February 2016, one world's tallest Jain statue with height 108 feet(113 feet including pedestal) was inaugurated. The consecration was attended by Chief Minister Devendra Fadnavis and many visionaries of Indian Government. Named as The Statue of Ahinsa, the idol is an exceptional piece of architecture and has become a pilgrim for Jains all across the world.

The foundation stone for this project was laid in 1996 under the inspiration of Gyanmati Mataji, a Jain nun. The motivation was given by Chandanamati Mataji. It was under their guidance that President Ravindrakirti Swamiji and Chief Secretary Dr. Pannalalji Papdiwal worked for 20 years to create this religious marvel.

== Jain Caves ==
In two main caves of Adinath and Shantinath Caves, an inscription of 1343(V.S. 1400) is found in Adinath Cave. There are several other caves named after deities and sages such as Seetalnath, Mahaveer, Adinath, Shantinath, Parshwanath and Ratnatrya. who were liberated there. At the foot of the hills there are three temples housing more than 75 idols. A Colossus of Bhagwan Munisuvrat Nath is there in Padmasana posture is present here.

On Tungi hill has two caves named on Bhagwan Chandraprabhu, the 8th Teerthankar and other is Ram Chandra Cave. 3.3 feet high idol of Bhagwan Chandraprabhu is carved in Chandraprabhu cave.

Mangi hill has ten caves. Mahavir cave has the Tirthankar Mahavir idol of white granite in padmasan posture. Cave #6 has the main idol of Parasvnath, beside his, are the images of Adinath. A 31 feet high statue of Bhagwan Bahubali has been erected recently.

== Jain Temples ==
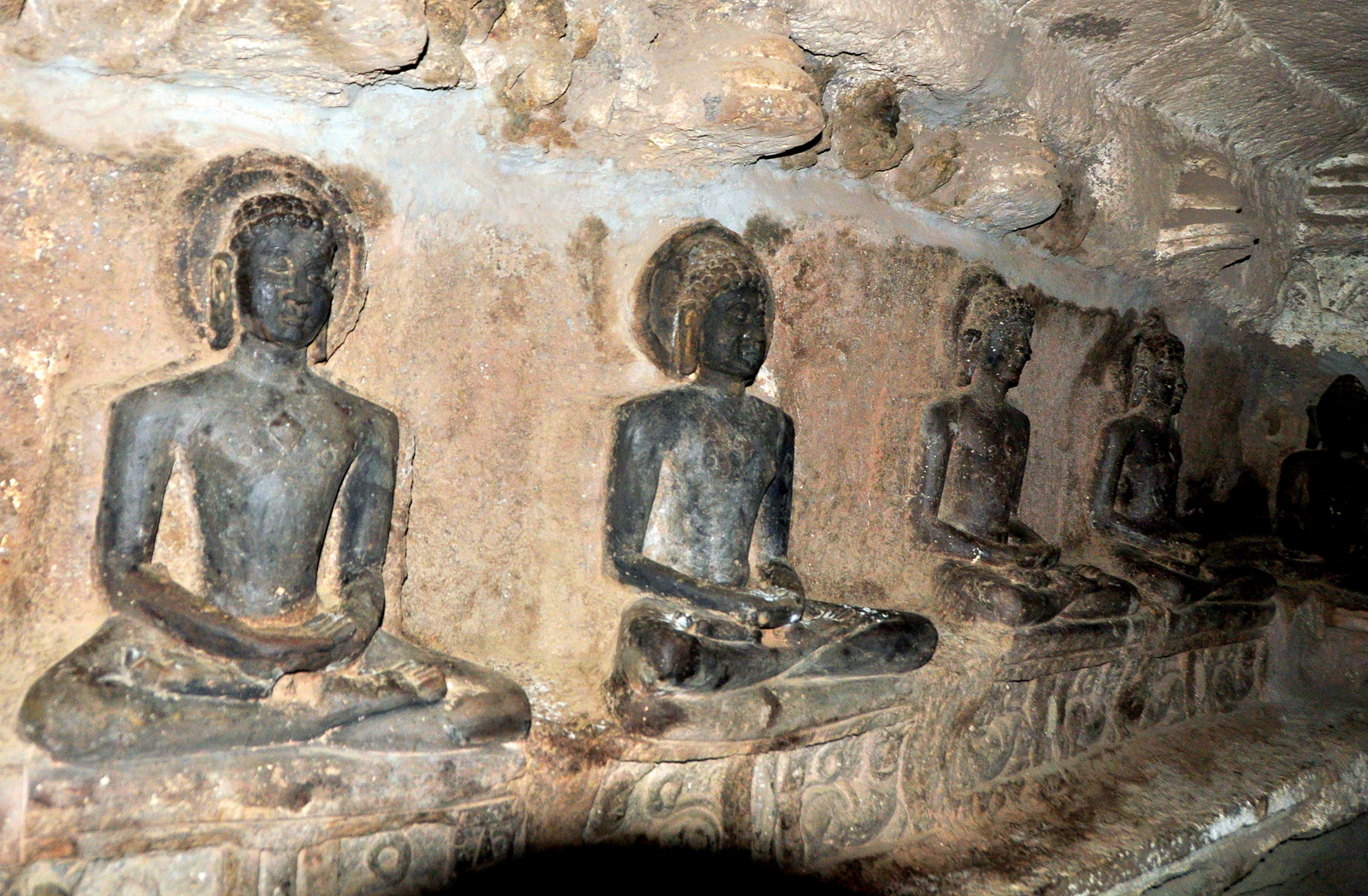
Mangi-tungi cave

=== Mangi giri hill ===
There are seven old temples on Mangi hill:

(i) Mahavir Digambar Jain Cave Temple : Main temple on Mangi hill is dedicated to Lord Mahavir. Moolnayak is 3.3 feet idol of Mahavira in padmasan posture. There are four other idols on the left side. Four idols of tirthankaras are carved on the wall.

(ii) Cave No 6 : Main idol of this temple is a 4.6 feet tall idol of Lord Adinath in padmasan posture. There are twenty idols on cave's wall in padmasan posture. Lord Parshvanath is in the middle of this temple. Two tirthankars sculptures in sitting padmasan and two in Kayotsarga posture are also there. Another 28 idols have also been carved here in padmasan posture on the wall.

(iii) Cave No. 7 : Four idols in four directions and four are on the sides of the wall.

(iv) Cave No. 8 : There are twenty idols and seven Jain saints sculptures.

(v) Cave No. 9 : 47 idols are on three side and in the middle of this cave there is an idol of 2.1 feet idol of Lord Parshvanath. 13 Jain saints are also seen on the cave's wall. On the hill's wall there are 24 tirthankar's sculpture and foot images of Jain saints who get salvation from this hill.

=== Tungi giri hill ===
There are four old temples on Mangi hill :

(i) Lord Chandraprabh Cave : Main idols is Lord Chandraprabh in padmasan posture which is 3.3 feet in height. There are another 15 idols out of which, seven idols are 2.1 feet in height and 8 idols are 1.3 feet in height. Two sculptures are carved on the wall in Kayotsarga posture that are 10 inches in height. All the temples belong to the period of 7th - 8th century.

=== At foothill ===
There are four temples on the foot of the hill :

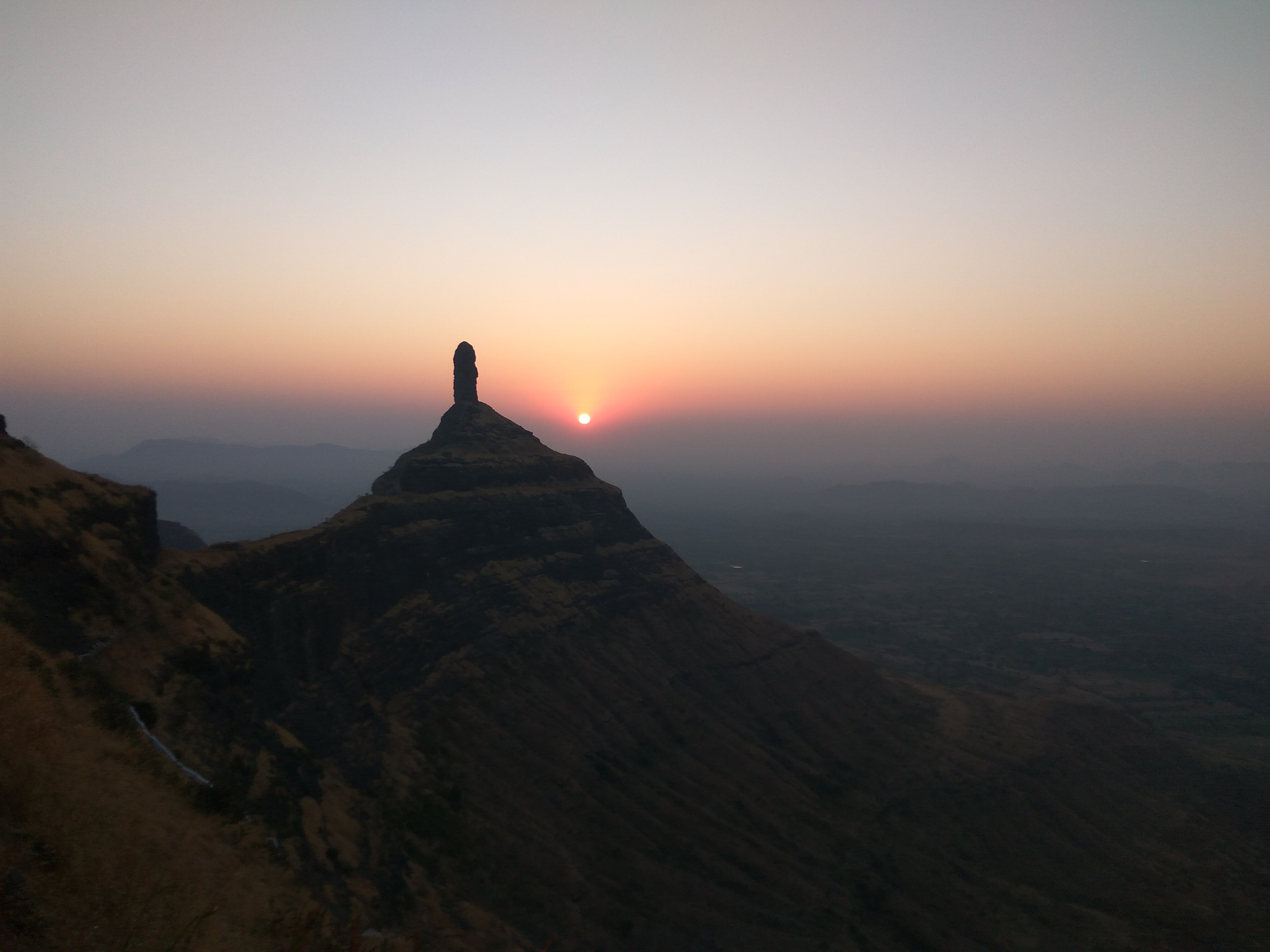
Sunrise above Tungi Peak

(i) Lord Parshvanath Jain Temple : Main idol of this temple is a 3.8 feet idol Lord Parshvanath in padmasan posture, installed in 1858(V.S. 1915). There is samavsharan temple and in this temple 12 idols are made in stone and 33 idols are made in metal.

(ii) Lord Adinath Temple : Main idol of this temple is a 2.5 feet idol of Lord Adinath in padmasan posture. On left side of the idol is a 2.1 feet tall idols of Lord Vimalnath and on right side is an idol of Chandraprabhu in padmsan posture.

(iii) Lord Parshvanath Temple : Main idol is a 3.6 feet idol of Lord Parshvanath in padmasan posture, installed in 1813(V.S. 1870).

(iv) Sahatrakoot Lotus Temple and Garden : This temple has 1008 Idols.

== Religious organizations ==
The Dakshin Bharat Jain Sabha is a religious and social service organization of the Jains of Southern India. The organization is headquartered at Sangli, Maharashtra, India. The association is credited with being one of the first Jain associations to start reform movements among the Jains in modern India. The organization mainly seeks to represent the interests of the native Jains of Maharashtra (Marathi Jains), Karnataka (Kannada Jains) and (Ayodhya Jains, Rikabganj) Goa.

Bhagwan Shri Rishabdev 108 feet Vishalkay Digamber Jain Murti Nirman committee is the main organization responsible for construction of 108 feet tall statue of Lord Rishabhdev at Mangi Tungi. The trust is now constructing Nav Grahe Mandir at the foothills of Mangi Tungi. Its Panchkalyanak is going on from 1 to 6 February 2017.

== See also ==
- List of forts in Maharashtra
- Statue of Ahimsa
