= Kothali, Karnataka =

Village in Karnataka, India

Kothali, short for Kothalilitulanda, is a village in Chikkodi taluk Belgaum district of Karnataka, India.
