= Champapur =

- Village
- Location within Bihar Location within India
- Coordinates: 27.1080°N 84.4640°E
- Country: India
- State: Bihar
- District: West Champaran
- Block: Narkatiaganj

Languages
  - Official: Hindi
- Time zone: UTC+5:30 (IST)
- PIN: 845451
- Telephone code: 06254
- ISO 3166 code: IN-BR
- Vehicle registration: BR-22
- Nearest city: Narkatiaganj
- Sex ratio: ♂/♀
- Lok Sabha constituency: Valmiki Nagar
- Vidhan Sabha constituency: Narkatiaganj
- Civic agency: Champapur
- Climate: Normal

Champapur is a village in Narkatiaganj subdivision region West Champaran district in the Indian state of Bihar. The village is 15 km from Narkatiaganj, 36 km from its district West Champaran (also called Bettiah) and 230 km from its state capital city Patna.

== Demographics ==
As of the 2011 census of India, Champapur had a population of 1587 in 290 households. Males constitute 53% of the population and females 46%. Champapur has an average literacy rate of 47.82%, lower than the national average of 74%: male literacy is 64.16%, and female literacy is 35.83%. In Champapur, 22% of the population is under 6 years of age.
