= Tikait Nagar =

- Town
- Location in Uttar Pradesh, India
- Coordinates: 26°57′N 81°35′E
- Country: India
- State: Uttar Pradesh
- District: Barabanki

Government
  - Type: Nagar panchayat
  - Body: Bhartiye janta party(Jagdish Prasad Gupta

Population (2001)
  - Total: 8,246

Languages
  - Official: Hindi
- Time zone: UTC+5:30 (IST)
- Vehicle registration: UP-41

Tikait Nagar is a town and a nagar panchayat in Barabanki district in the Indian state of Uttar Pradesh.

== Demographics ==
As of 2001 India census, Tikait Nagar had a population of 8,246. Males constitute 53% of the population and females 47%. Tikait Nagar has an average literacy rate of 54%, lower than the national average of 59.5%: male literacy is 59%, and female literacy is 49%. In Tikait Nagar, 16% of the population is under 6 years of age.
