= Ajmer Jain temple =

Temple in Rajasthan, India

- Soniji Ki Nasiyan
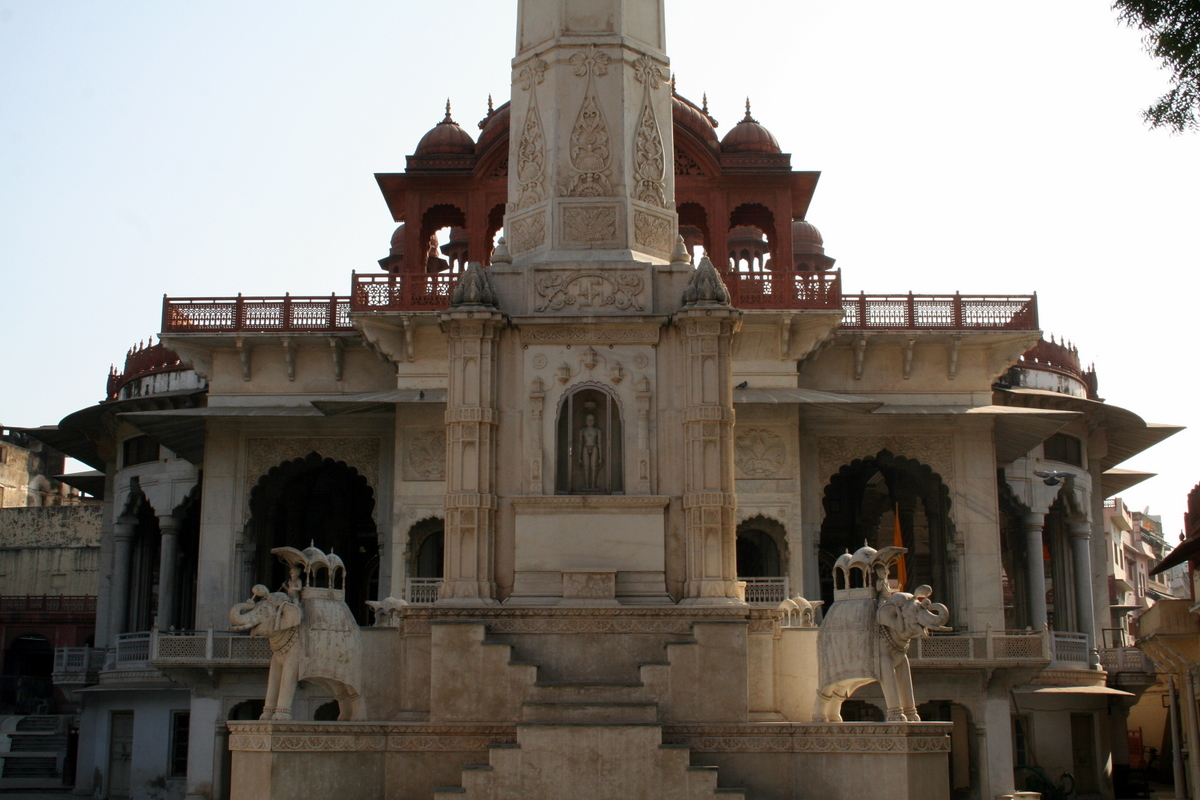
- Ajmer Jain Temple

- Location within Rajasthan

Religion
- Affiliation: Jainism
- Sect: Digambara
- Deity: Rishabhanatha
- Festival: Mahavir Jayanti

Location
- Location: Ajmer, Rajasthan
- Coordinates: 26.45°N 74.64°E

Architecture
- Creator: Seth Moolchand Soni
- Established: 1864–1895

The Ajmer Jain temple, also known as Soniji Ki Nasiyan, is a Jain temple in Ajmer, Rajasthan known for its architecture. It was built in the late nineteenth century. The main chamber, known as the Swarna Nagari "City of Gold", has several gold-plated wooden figures, depicting several figures in the Jain religion. This golden chamber of the temple uses 1,000 kg of gold to carve out a depiction of Ayodhya.

Kurt Titze, in his book, "Jainism: A Pictorial Guide to the Religion of Non-Violence" (1998, p. 143), writes on Soniji Ki Nasiyan:

"Ajmer's main attraction is - for the Jainas - the prominently situated Nasiayan Digambara Temple, or rather the two-storied Svarana Nagara Hall behind the temple, better known as the Museum. Both the temple and the museum were built and are still owned by the Soni family of Ajmer. The temple, dedicated to Rishabha or Adinatha in 1865, was constructed of red sandstone in a matter of a few years. Still, it took twenty-five years, from 1870 to 1895, to fashion - by artisans at Jaipur - the thousands of individual parts required to assemble a three-dimensional replica of the story of Rishabha following an old manuscript by Acharya Jinasena.

The thought of having such a three-dimensional model for educational purposes occurred to Seth Moolchand Soni, who was born in 1830, only after the completion of the temple. His death in 1891 prevented him from seeing his ambitious work in its finished state.

In many Jaina temples, one sees painted or figurative representations of the 'five auspicious events' (pancha-kalyanak) in the life of every Tirthankara: conception, birth, renunciation, enlightenment, and salvation (moksha or nirvana). The one at Ajmer, now over a hundred years old, is by far the largest and most artistic plastic representation of that much-loved mythological narrative. A specially designed hall of 24.3 m by 12.2 m had to be built to display it effectively. It is open to visitors of all religions every day all the year round for a very small entry fee."

== History ==
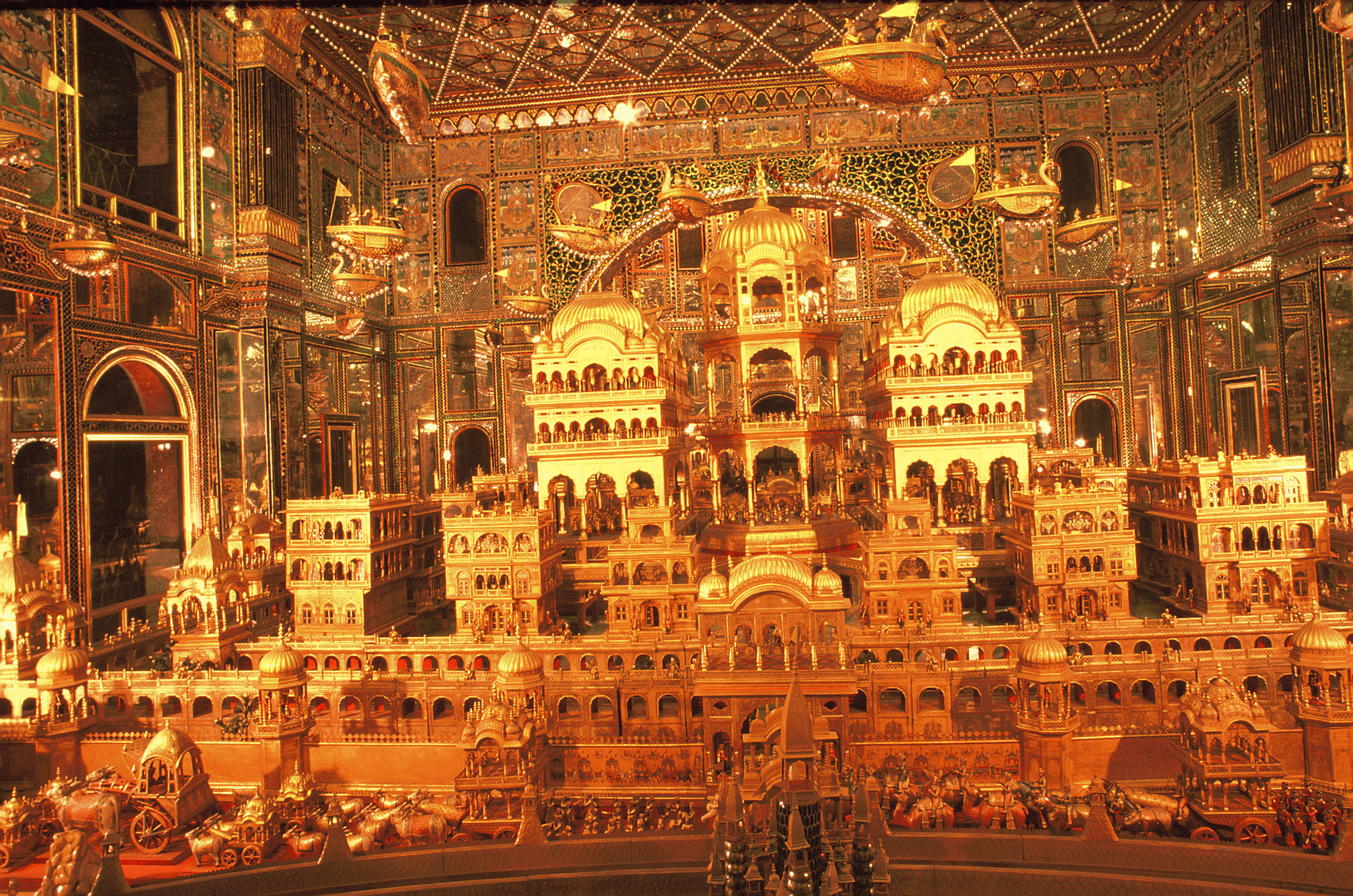
Depiction of Ayodhya

Greatly revered by the Digambar sect of the Jains, the Nasiyan temple is dedicated to Rishabhdev, the first of the 24 tirthankara by Rai Bahadur Seth Moolchand and Nemichand Soni. It is situated on Prithvi Raj Marg in Ajmer, the heart of Rajasthan state in India. The foundation of this magnificent Jain temple was laid on 10 October 1864 and the image of Rishabhdev (Adinath), was installed in the Sanctum Sanctorum on 26 May 1865. This work was carried out under the able guidance of the great scholar Pandit Sadasukhdasji of Jaipur.

The name of the temple is Siddhkoot Chaityalaya. It is also known as 'Red Temple' as it is built of red sandstone or 'Nasiyan of Seth Moolchand Soni' signifying the founder’s name. After the Svarna Nagri was added to the temple in 1895 CE, it popularly began to be called 'Sone ka Mandir' or 'Soni Mandir' emphasizing the golden structure as well as the family name. The halls of this temple are adorned with fascinating series of large, gilt wooden figures and delicate paintings that display scenes from Jain scriptures.

== Description ==
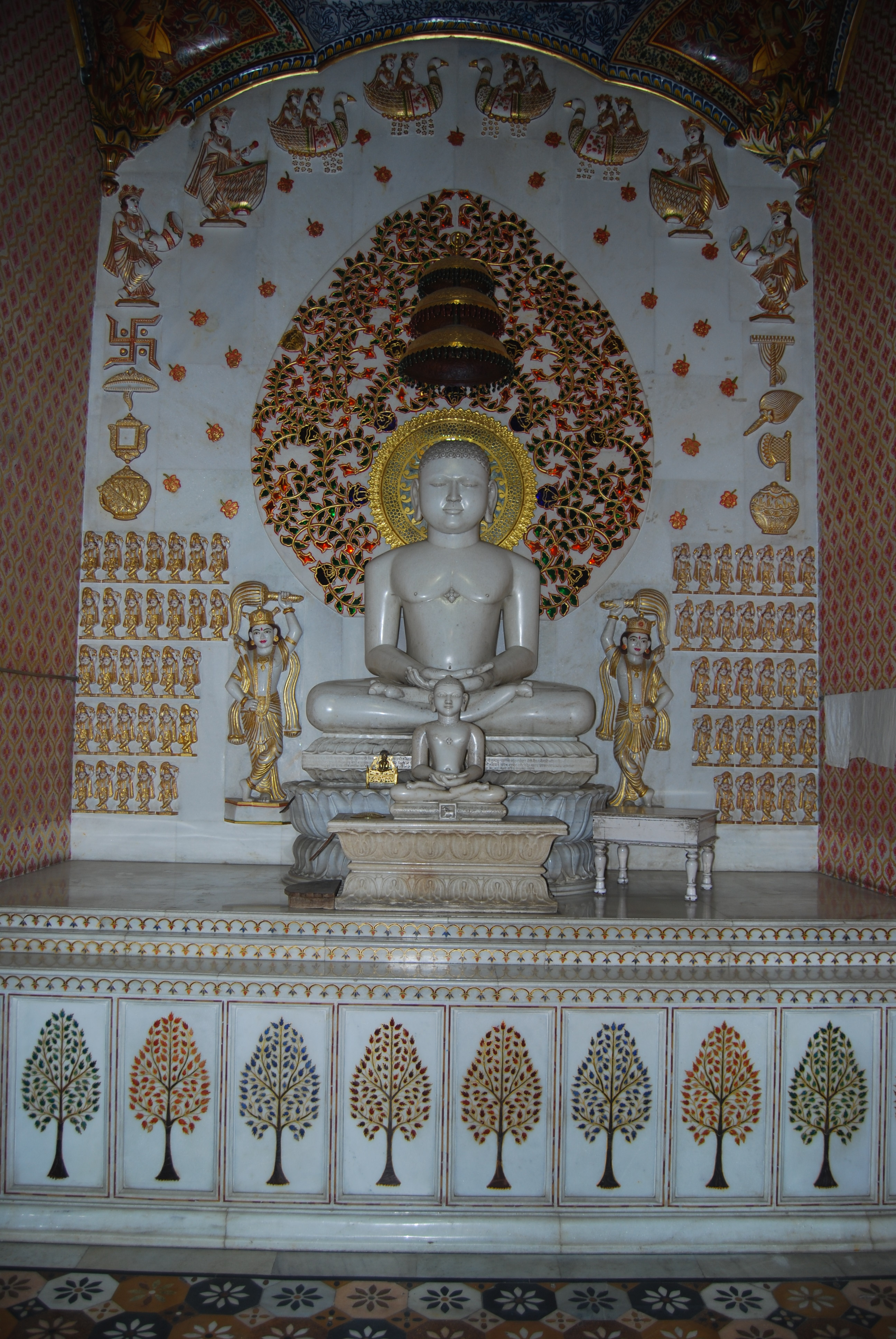
Main vedi

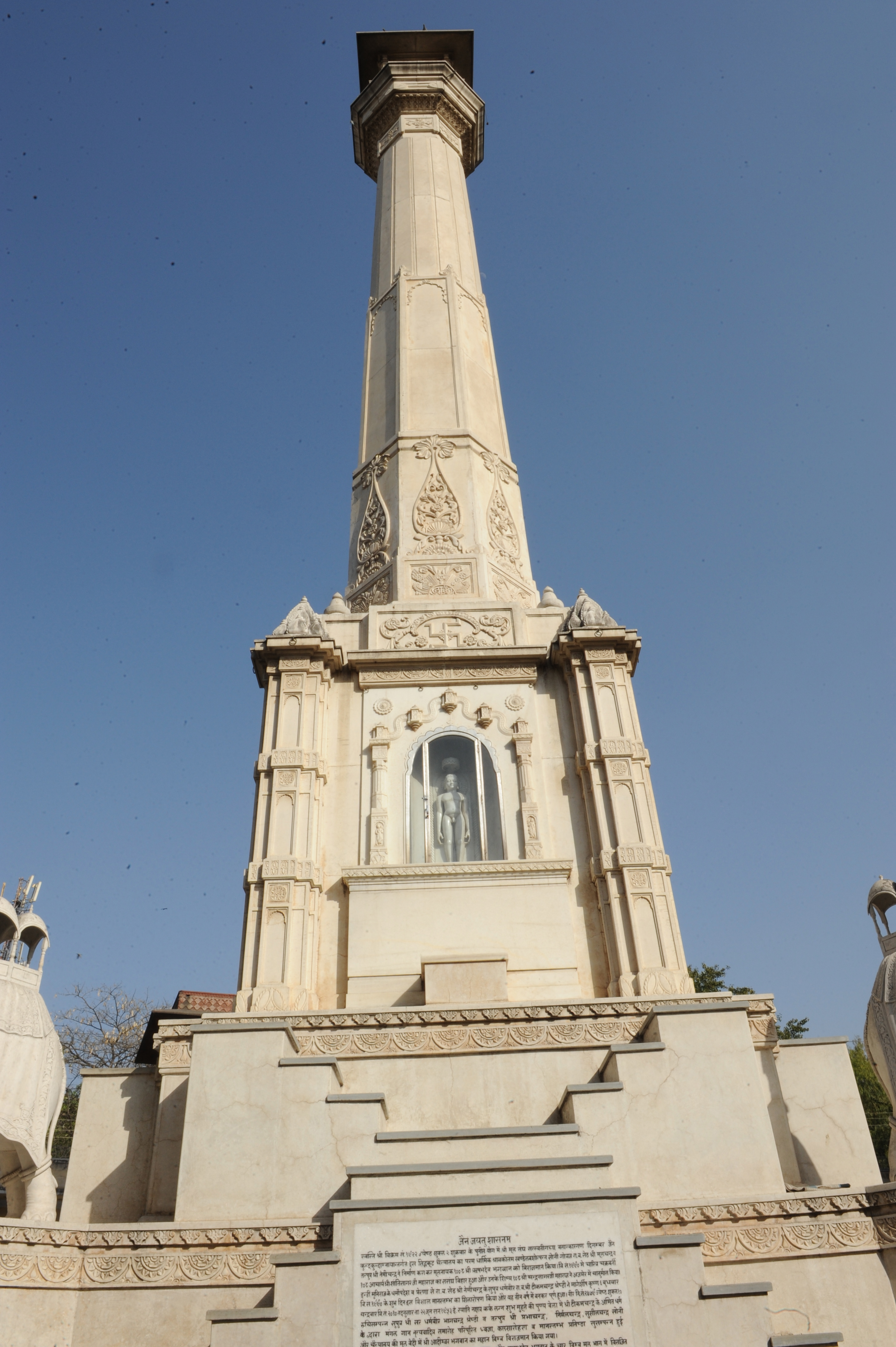
Manasthamba

The entrance gate of the temple is made of red sandstone brought from Karauli. In front of the gateway is the marble staircase, leading to the main temple, which is embellished with the images of the Tirthankars. The columns inside the temple are noted for their unique design. The mulnayak of the temple is a large white marble idol of Rishabhanatha. The Abhiṣeka of deity is organised daily with water, milk, etc. The temple features a massive gateway with three-way pointed high-rise arches with elaborate Jharokhas.

Vedi's

The central image is of Rishabhdev seated in the "Samavasarana" – in which He imparts true knowledge to the suffering humanity, so that they get liberated from the entanglements of life and death. In 2005, the 3 Vedi's were renovated and all the idols of Tirthankaras were re-installed amidst religious rituals and ceremonies. In this portion, only Jains are allowed to perform their religious rituals.

Manastambha

On entering this temple one gets the view of the 82 feet high Manastambha. R. B. Seth Tikamchand Soni laid the foundation and R. B. Seth Sir Bhagchand Soni built this Manastambha. He, along with his sons Prabhachand, Nirmalchand & Sushilchand consecrated and installed the images of the Jain Tirthankars in it. A function was held for ten days in June 1953, where along with the members of the Soni family, thousands of others participated.

Library

In the year 1974, in the auspicious presence of 108 Acharya Vidyasagar, a big library was established by R.B. Seth Sir Bhagchand Soni. The library houses rare Jain scriptures which are extensively used for research by scholars.

Visitors

The temple is being visited by many tourists annually. Distinguished Visitors include India's first President Dr. Rajendra Prasad, Prime Ministers Jawaharlal Nehru, Indra Gandhi, Morarji Desai & Rajiv Gandhi, Commander-in-Chief General K.M.Kariappa. Pre-independence the Viceroy and Vicereine of India Lord & Lady Irwin and Lady Willingdon also visited.

== Svarna Nagri (The Museum Section) ==
It came to R.B. Seth Moolchand Soni’s mind that 5 Kalyanakas of Lord Rishabhdev could be displayed in models. Accordingly, the work started in Jaipur and it took 25 years to complete these replicas of Ayodhya and Mount Sumeru. The whole structure, covered with gold leaf, is made according to the descriptions contained in Adi Purana written by Shri Jina Sen Acharya.

On completion, the models were displayed in Museum Hall in Jaipur. A big fair was celebrated for ten days in 1895 A.D which was attended by Maharaja Madhosinghji of Jaipur. The models were thereafter installed in the building behind the main Temple. This Hall is richly painted in variegated colours, and the walls and ceiling are covered with glass mosaic work.

Garbha Kalyanak (Conception)

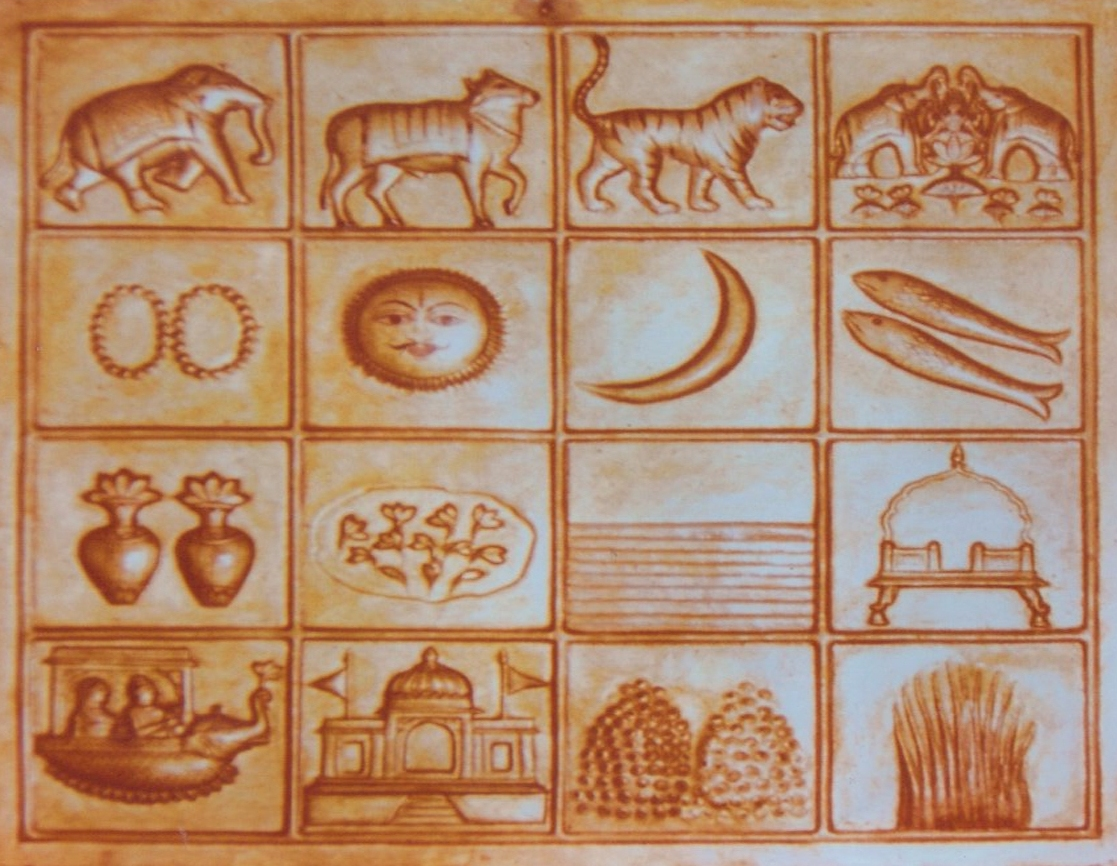
Depiction of Sixteen Dreams

The great soul of the Lord is emulated and glorified by the celestials even six months before He comes into his mother's womb. Saudharma Indra, the Lord of the celestials, ordered Kubera to rain down priceless jewels in the palace of his father Maharaj Nabhiraj, thus announcing the coming of the Saviour of the World. The golden city of Ayodhya was constructed by the celestials according to the wishes of Indra. After six months, the mother Marudevi saw sixteen symbolic dreams, signifying that she was going to be the mother of The Tirthankar.

Janma Kalyanak (Birth)

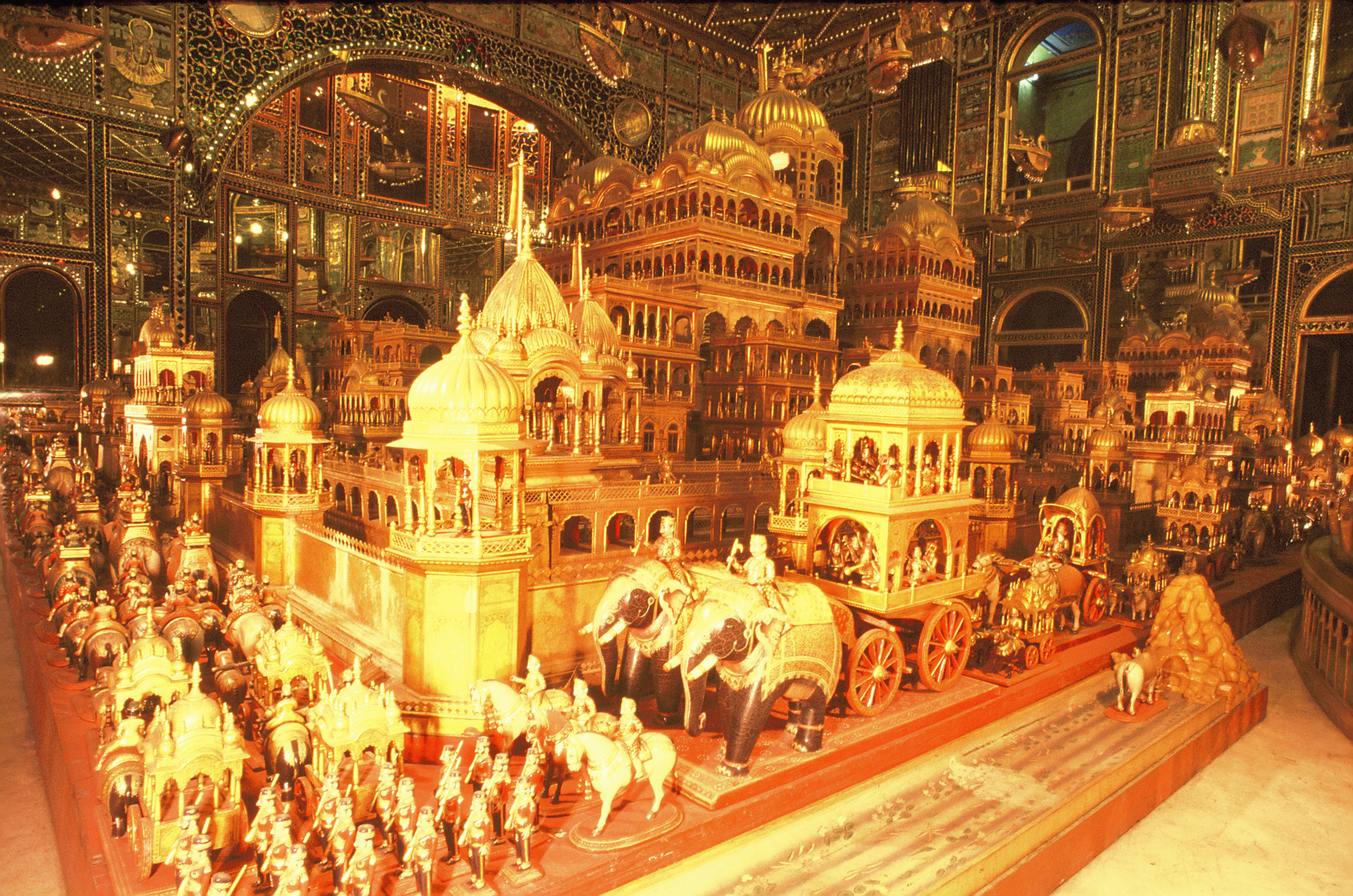
Depiction of Procession of Celestials

When Lord Rishabhdev was born in the royal palace in the center of Ayodhya, the thrones of Indras vibrated indicating the birth of the Divine Child. The celestials marched towards the city with great majesty. Indra, after completing three rounds of the city took the newborn Tirthankar on the 'Airavata (Elephant) to Mt. Sumeru. On this golden mountain lies Panduk Shila upon which the Tirthankar was seated for Mahabhisheka.

Tap Kalyanak (Renunciation)

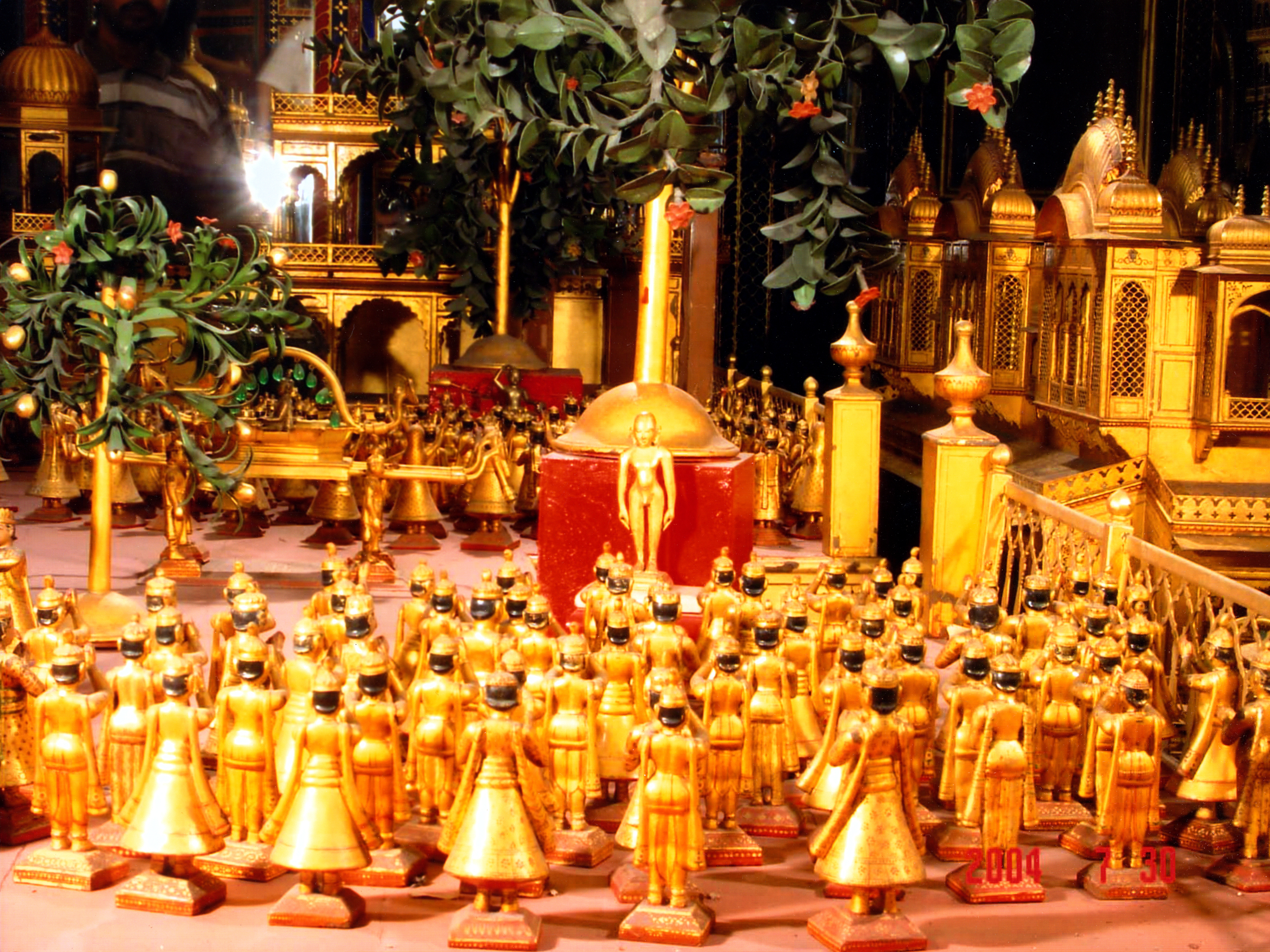
Rishabhanatha in meditation

As Rishabhdev became engrossed in worldly affairs, Indra appeared before Him with Apsara Nilanjana. She danced before Him and suddenly disappeared, discarding her mortal coil. This reminded Rishabhdev of the transient nature of the World and He decided to renounce it.

Installing his eldest son Bharat in his place, He left the palace followed by 4,000 other kings. Indra followed by the other celestials, took Rishabhdev in procession to the Triveni, the confluence of the Ganga, Yamuna and Sarasvati at Prayag (Allahabad) where under the shade of the Akshayavat (sacred banyan tree) Rishabhdev gave up the world, including his clothes and gave himself to contemplation. He pulled out his hair (Kesh Lonch) with his own hands depicting his extreme detachment from all worldly and bodily comforts. Lord Rishabhdev took his first meal after one year of austerities and penance. Raja Shreyans, the king of Gajapura (now Hastinapur), had the good fortune of being the first person to offer him a meal in the form of sugarcane Juice on the 3rd day of the bright fortnight of the month of Vaishakha. This occasion is celebrated even today as Akshaya Tritiya. There is a model of the city of Hastinapur with golden chariots and statues. The structure is also known as Siddhkoot Chaityalaya.

Keval Jnan Kalyanak (Omniscience)

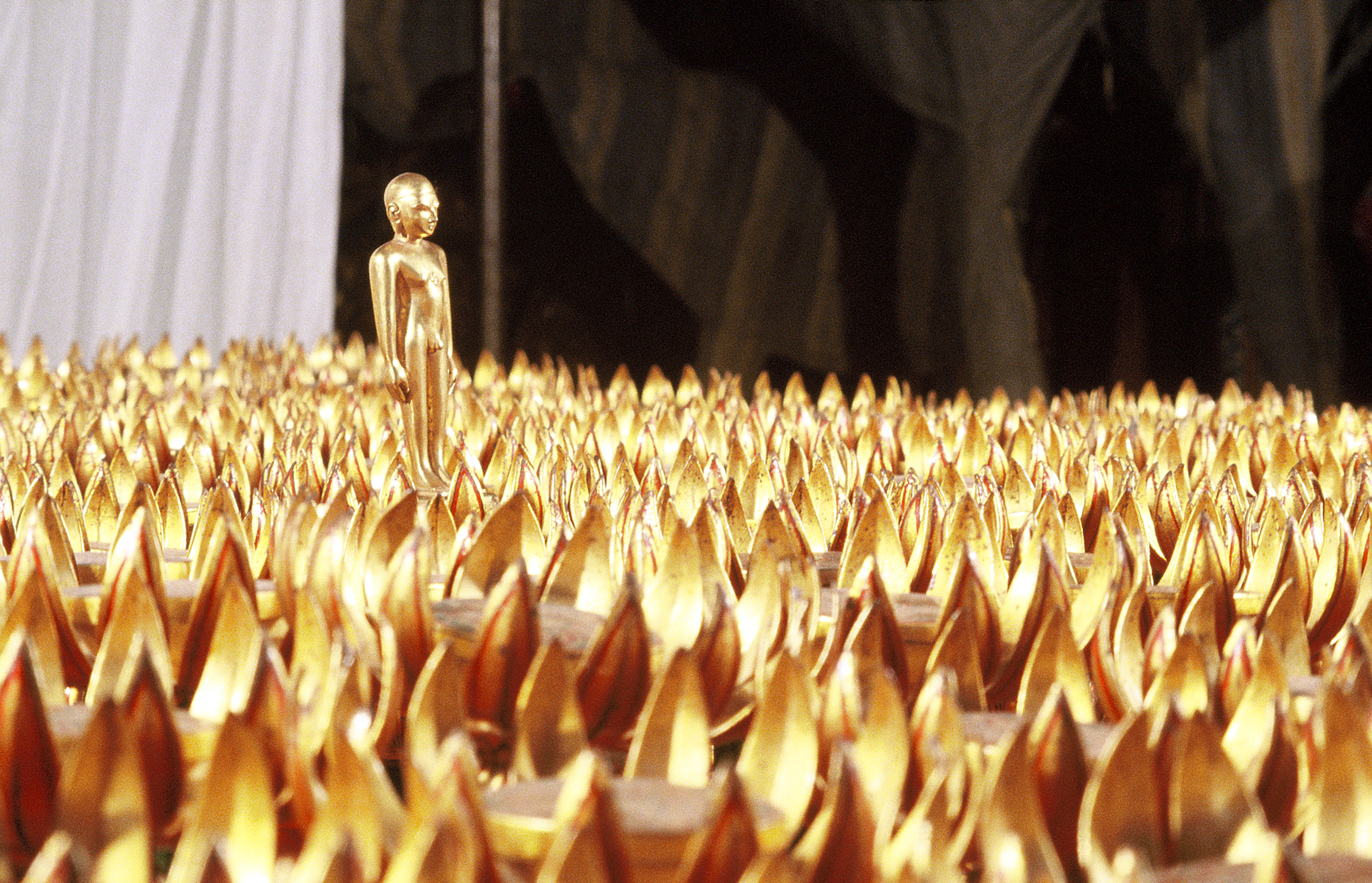
Rishabhanatha moving over golden lotus after attaining Omniscience

After 1,000 years of austerities and penance, Lord Rishabhdev attained Keval Jnan (Omniscience) at Mount Kailash. Indra arranged a beautiful place of the congregation known as "Samavasarana" where the Lord preached the doctrine of non-attachment to the world. Celestials, humans, and even birds & animals gathered around the lord. Tirthankars attain the power of walking in the sky after attaining Omniscience. 225 Golden lotuses are placed beneath the Lord's feet during his travel by Indra.

Moksha Kalyanak

On Mount Kailash where Rishabhdev attained Salvation or Nirvana, his eldest son Bharat, the first Chakravartin (emperor of Bharat Kshetra), constructed seventy-two golden temples.

Museum Hall

The Museum Hall, opened recently to public,was also built along with the main temple 150 years back. Although, it never got into display before 2023 to general public. The artwork done in the hall is made with limestone and natural earth colours. There has been no retouching done in the art work since last 150 years. The hall displayes 130 years old artefacts, which include the remaining 2 panchkalyanak – Keval Gyan and Moksh. Keval Gyan depicted through the Tirthankar Rishabhdev walking above 225 golden lotuses and Moksha depicted through a model of Mount Kailash. The hall also depicts a golden model of Hastinapur, where the Tirthankar was providedhis first meal of sugarcane juice by King Shreyans. The museum also houses a number of chariots covered with gold leaf. These 19th century chariots are still used in procession of Mahavir Jayanti and other religious functions

== Gallery ==
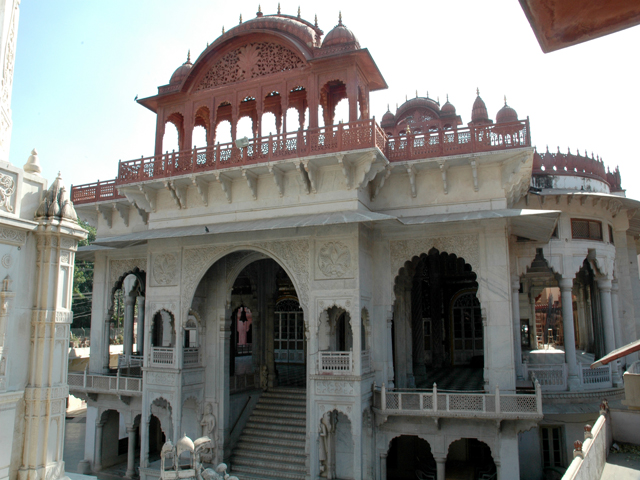
Entrance of the temple

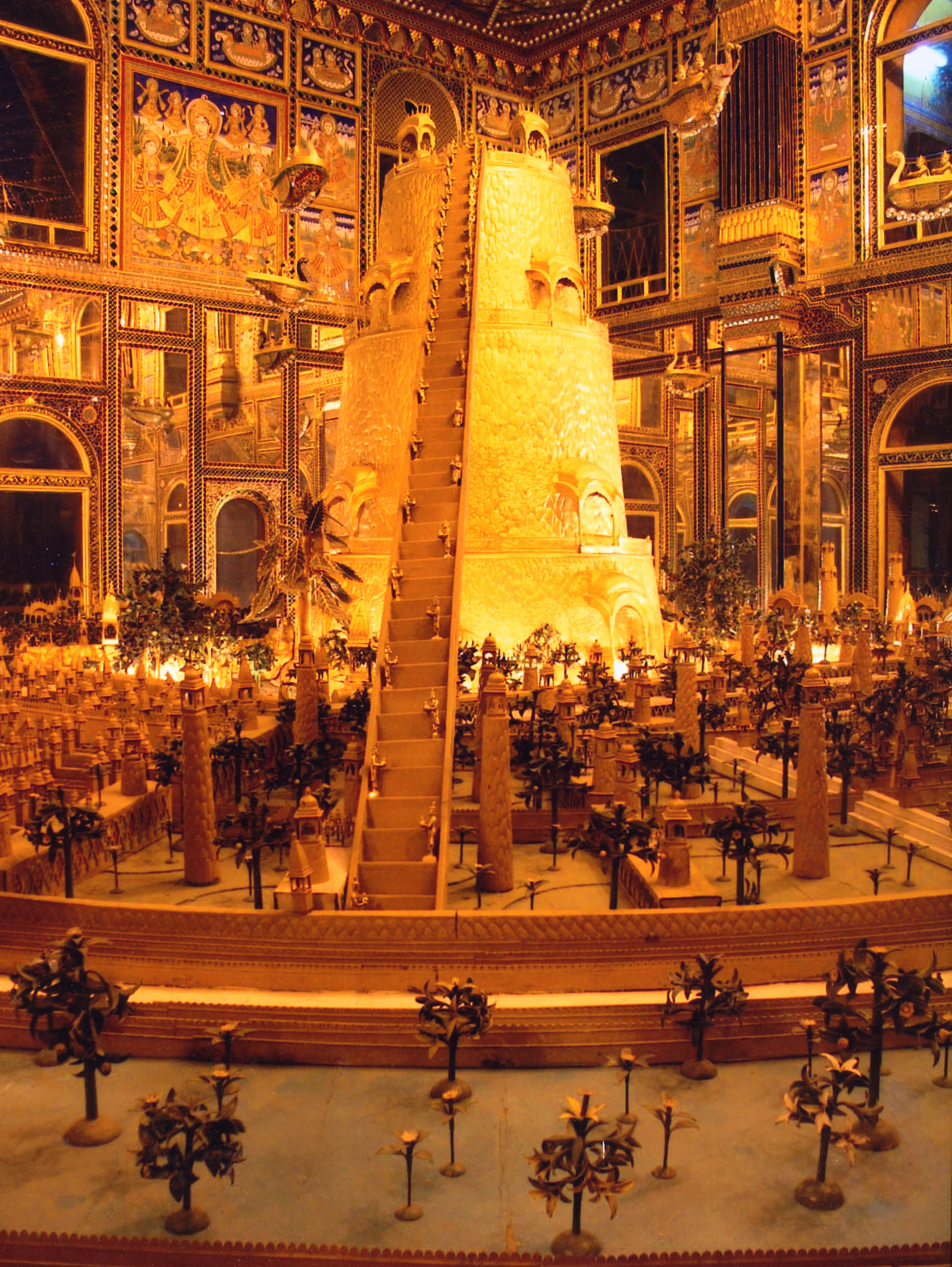
Depiction of Mount Sumeru

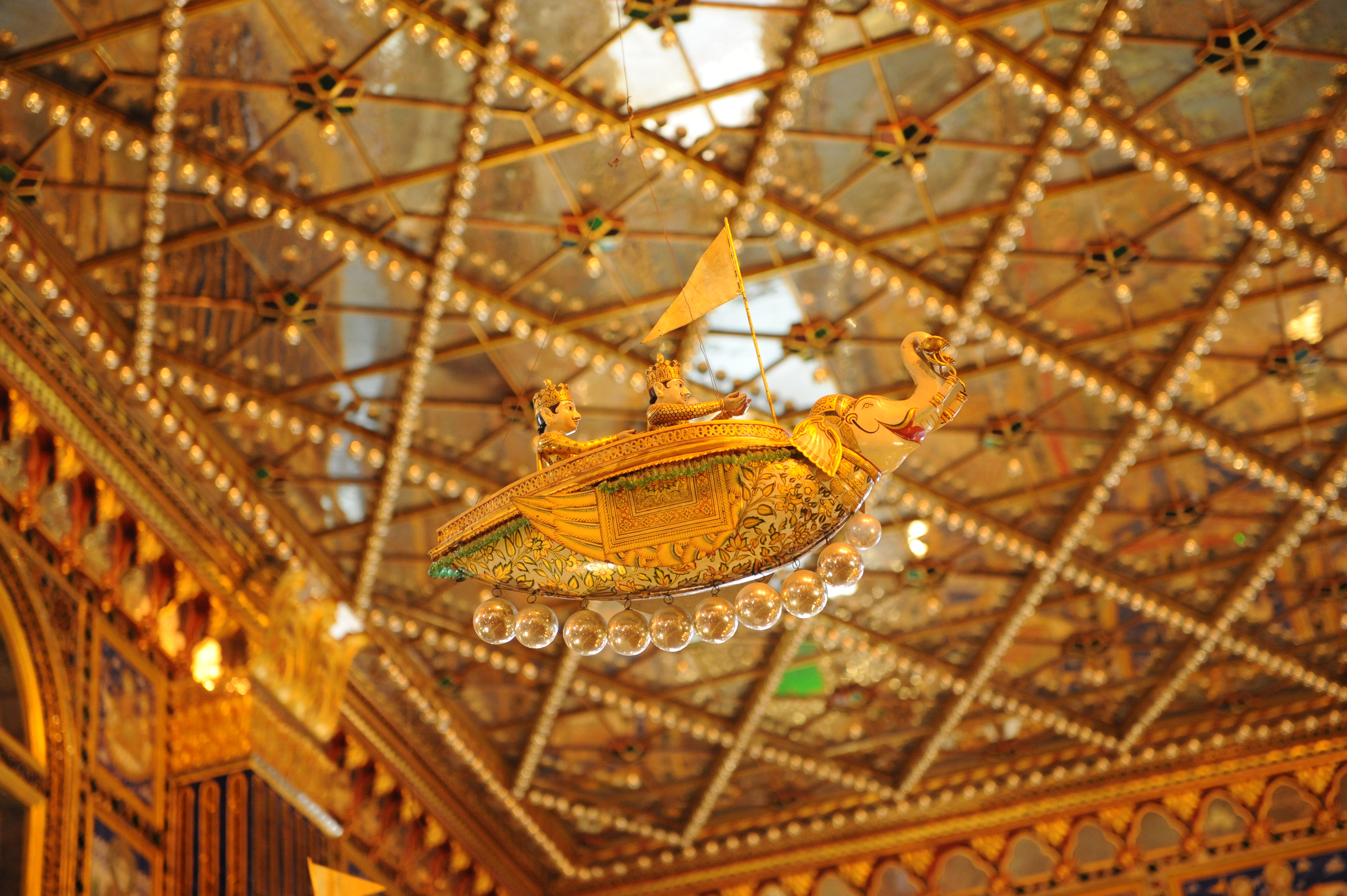
Depiction of Celestial Air Ship

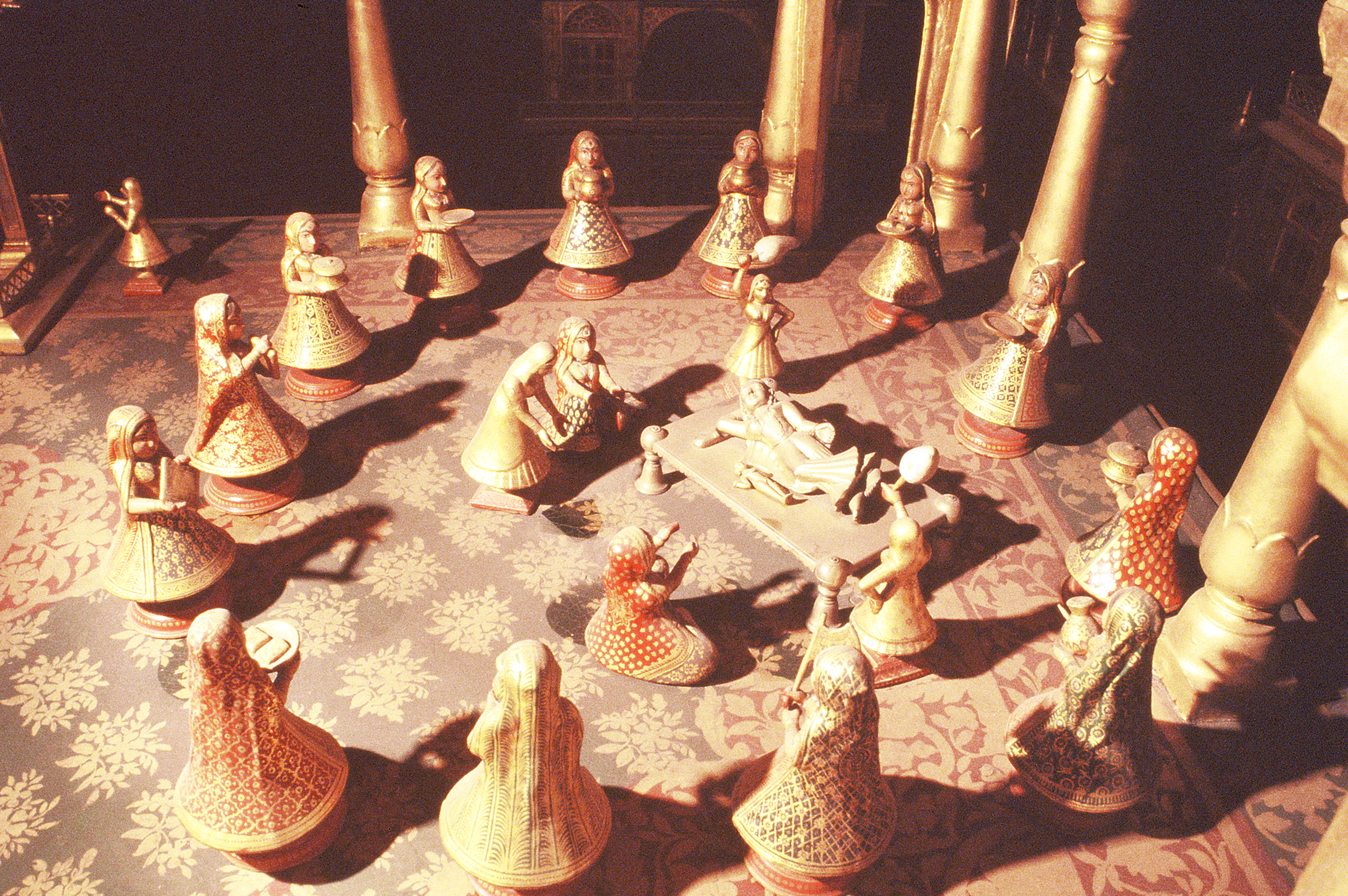
Depiction of newborn Rishabhanatha with her mother

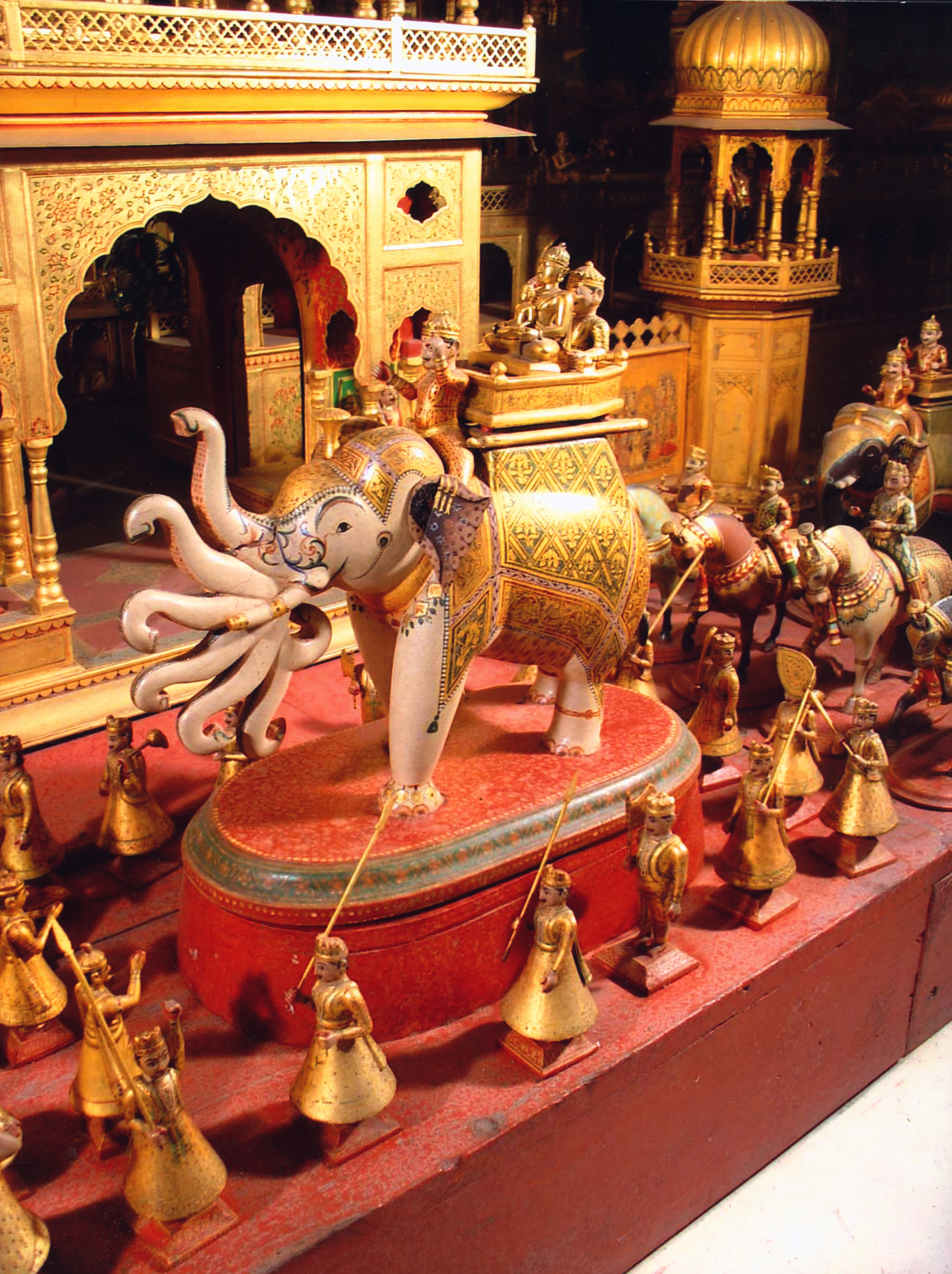
Depiction of Baby Rishabhanatha on Airawat Elephant

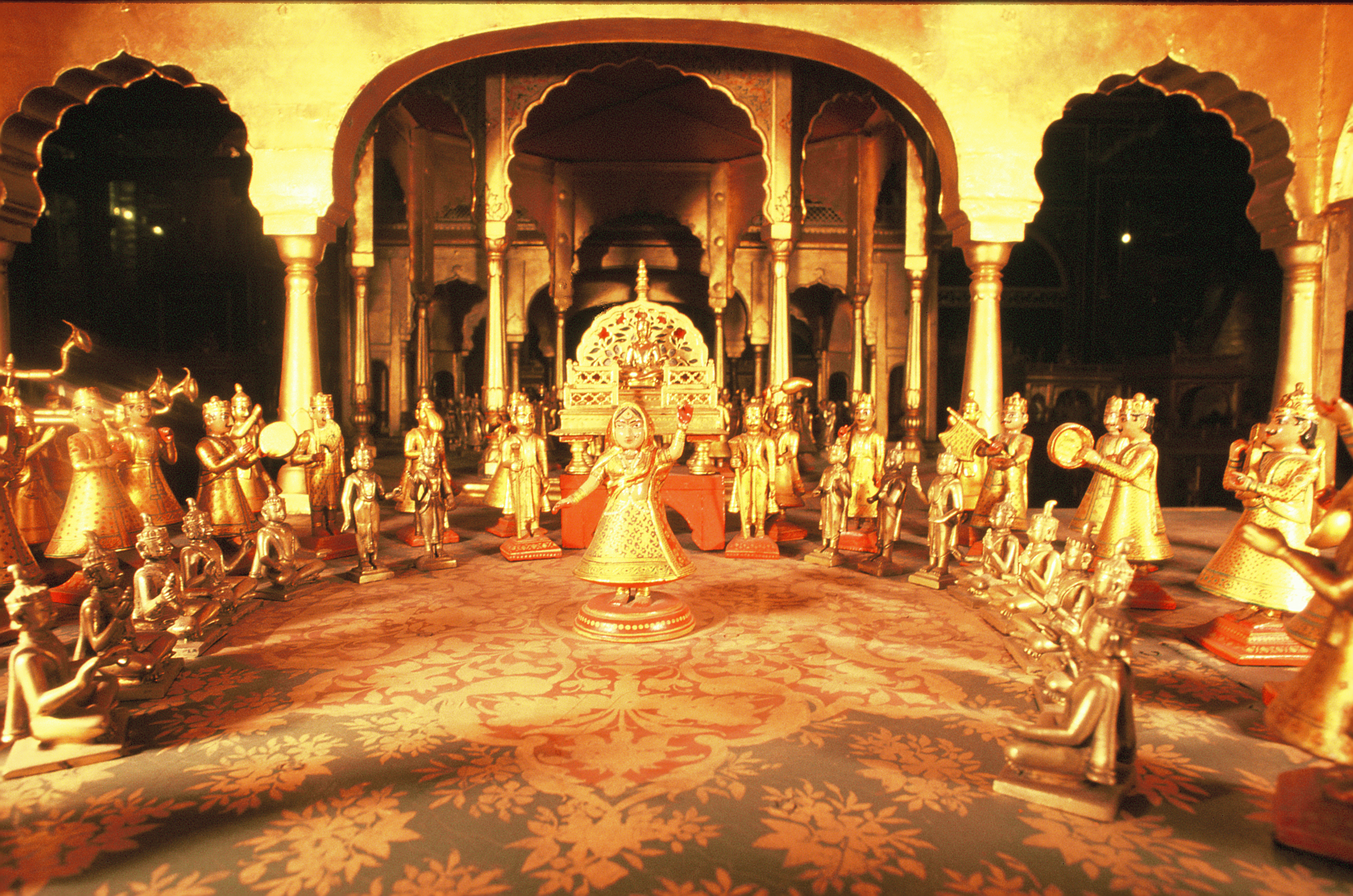
Dance of Apsara Nilanjana

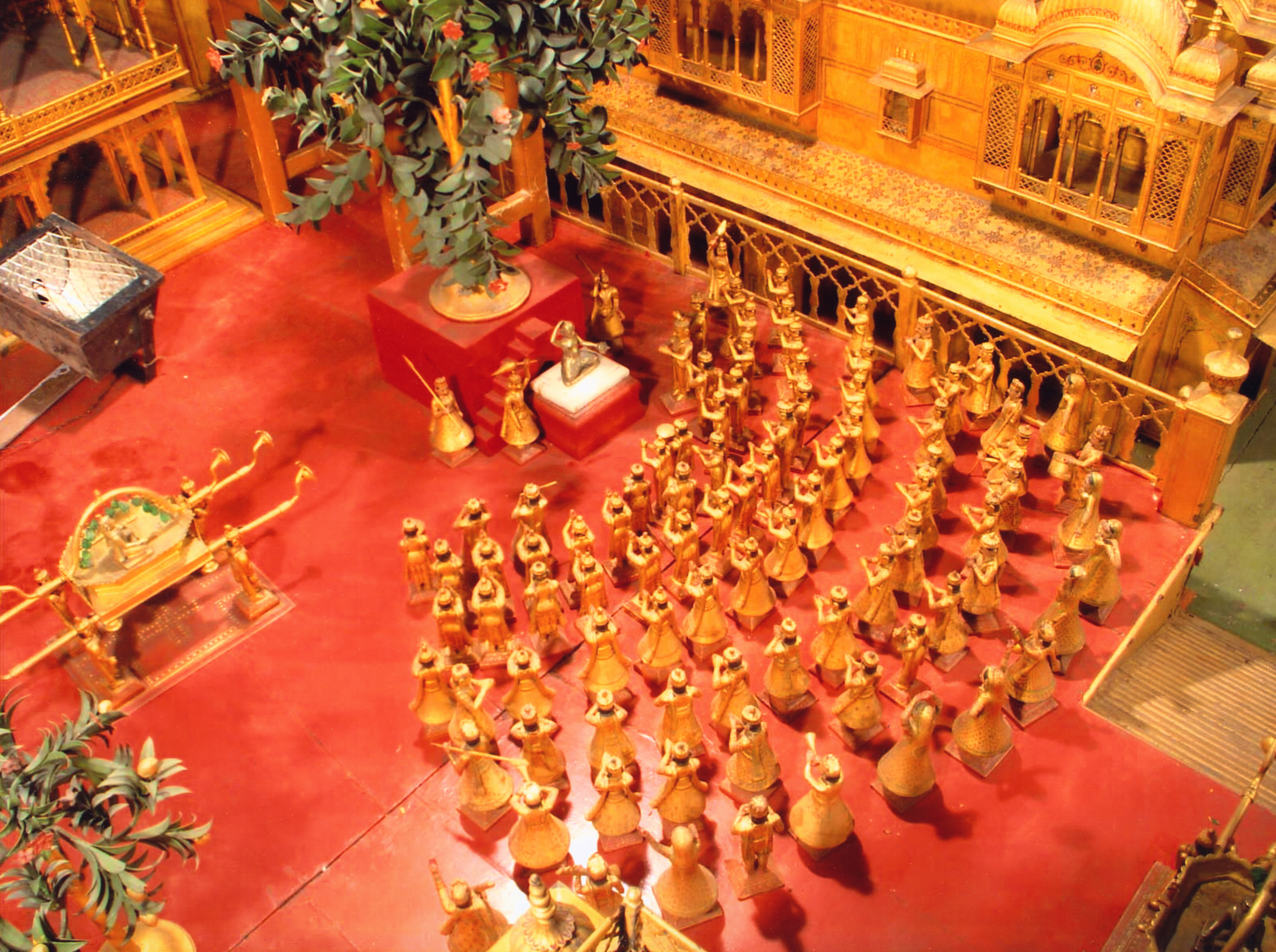
Rishabhanatha performing "Kesh Lonch"

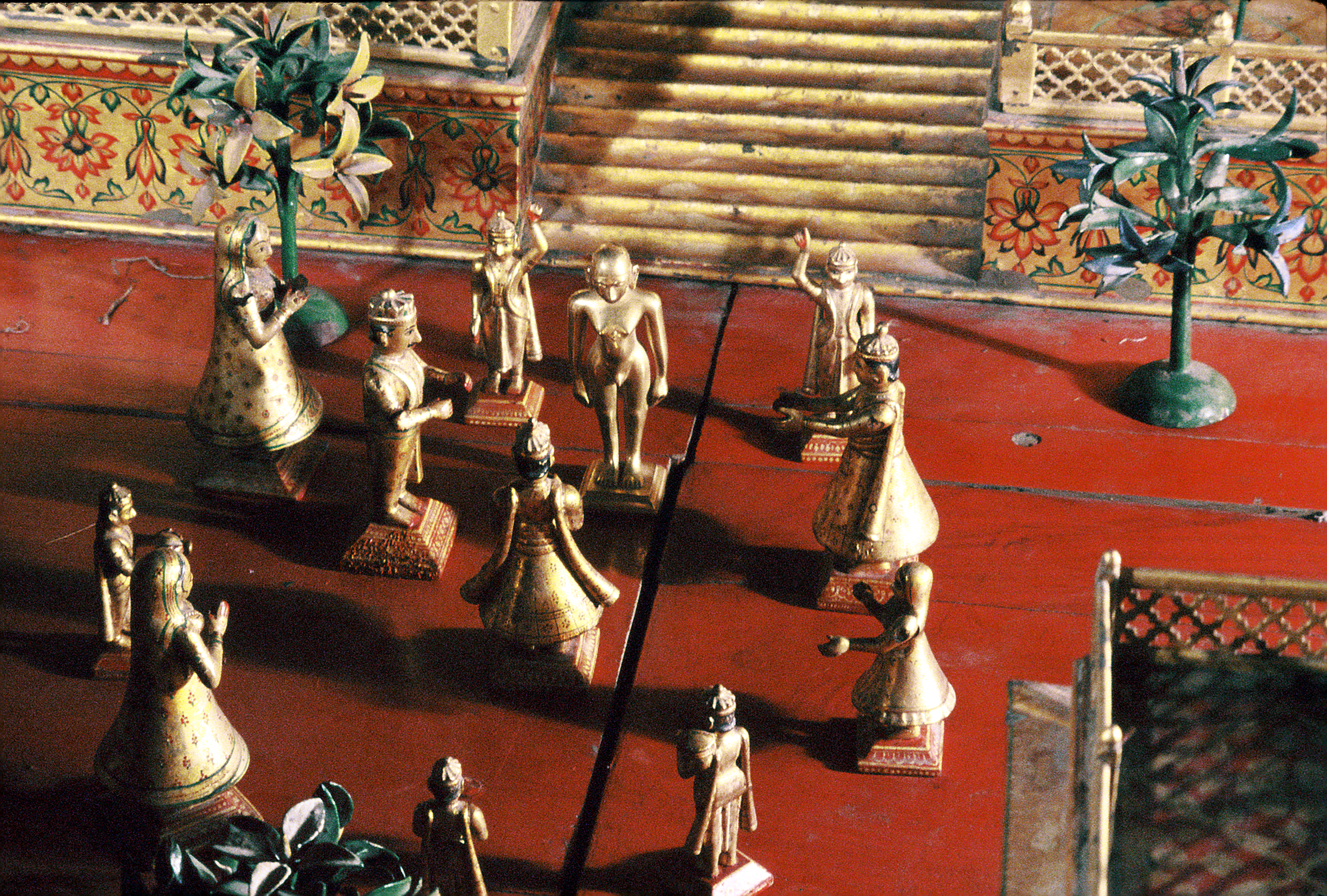
Shreyans, the king of Hastinapur offering Sugarcane juice to Rishabhanatha

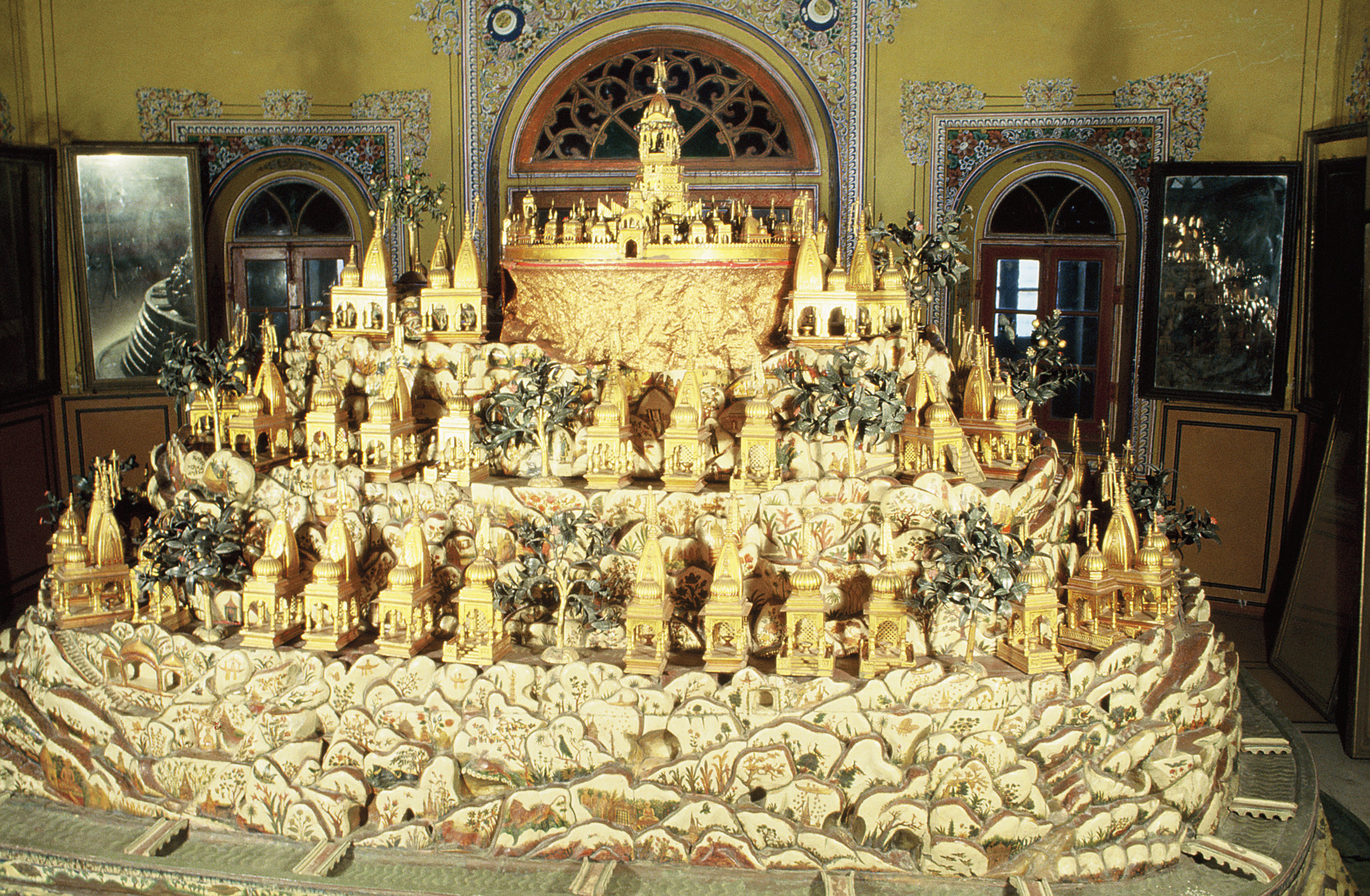
Rishabhanatha in Samosharan on Mount Kailash

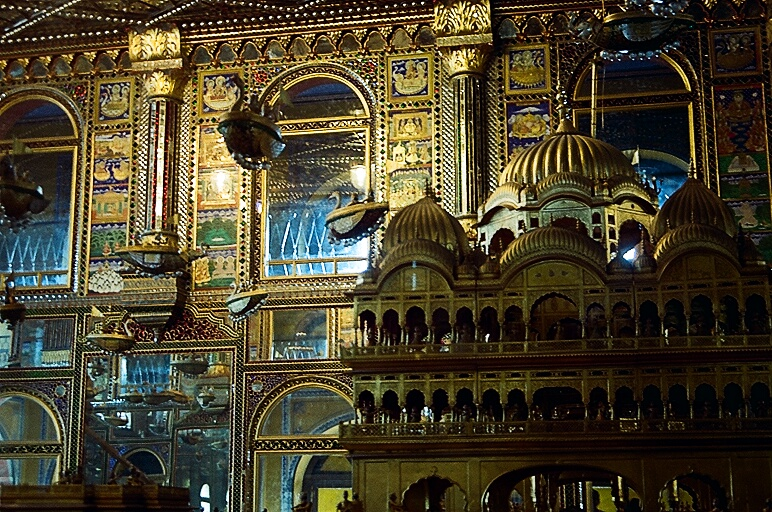
Jain Museum, Ajmer

== See also ==
- Panch Kalyanaka
- Nareli Jain Temple
- Jainism in Rajasthan
