= Sadalga =

- Interactive map of Sadalga
- Coordinates: 16°33′12.693″N 74°31′55.019″E
- Time zone: UTC+5:30 (IST)
- Postal code: 591239
- Website: http://www.sadalgatown.mrc.gov.in/

Sadalga (or Sadalaga) is a municipal town in Chikodi Taluka in the Belagavi district of Karnataka, India. It is best known as the birth place of Digambar Jain Acharya Shri Vidyasagar Ji Maharaj . His home is recently converted into a museum.

It is situated near the Maharashtra border and is located on the banks of the Dudhaganga river. Many Taluka level offices are located throughout the town.

== Geography ==
Sadalga is located 593 km northwest of Bangalore at 16.57°N 74.55°E. in the Belagavi District of Karnataka, India.

The town is almost equidistant between the cities of Ichalkaranji and Chikodi. Sadalga is on the bank of the Doodhaganga, a river with a small bridge 500 m from Sadalga; the river flows by the northern side of the town. It provides water for the town's households and fulfills the irrigation needs around the city. There are a few surrounding villages, like the villages of Bhainakwadi and Vadagol, that constitute the Sadalga Town municipality.

== Demographics ==
According to the 2001 Indian census, Sadalga had a population of 23,790 inhabitants. The population was estimated to be 51% male and 49% female.

The average literacy rate in Sadalga is 68%. The town also has an Arts and Commerce public university, Degree College, and an Industrial Training Institute College. Recently, a new Government Polytechnic College and a Kendriya Vidyalaya were inaugurated in the town.

The primary language in Sadalga is Kannada.

== Jain Temples in Sadalaga ==
There are total 7 Jain temples in Sadalaga

1) Shri 1008 Bhagwan Adinath Digambara Jain Mandir (Rock Jinalay (Kalla Basti) )

2) Shri 1008 Bhagavan Parshwanath Digambara Jain Temple (Big Jinalaya (Dodda Basti) ).

3) Shri 1008 Bhagwan Parswanath Digambara Jain Mandir (Shikhara Jinalay).

4) Shri 1008 Bhagavan Chandraprabhu Digambara Jain Mandir (Gumpa Jianalay).

5) Shri 1008 Bhagavan Shantinath Digambara Jain Mandir (Acharya Sri Vidyasagarji Maharaj Birth Place).

6) 1008 Bhagwan Shantinath Digambara Jain Mandir (Huddar Farm Area)

7) 1008 Bhagawan Munisruvatnath Digambara Jain Mandir (Shastri Chowk)

== Religious buildings ==
Mahadev Mandir, Vitthal Mandir, Ekavira Mandir, Ganesh Mandir, Aranyasiddheswar Mandir, Hanuman Mandir, Bhandarad Odeya Dhari Deva Temple, Khwaja Shamanamir Dargah, and Puratan Datta Mandir are the temples in the town.

The Chatrapati Shivaji Maharaj Chowk marketplace is named after the founder of the Maratha Empire. There are many religious buildings sectioned by MLA Ganesh Hukkeri and former MP Prakash Babanna Hukkeri

The tomb of Muslim Dargāh, the saint of Chishti Order Shaikh Khwaja Abdul Malik Mira murid of Nasiruddin Muhammad Chirag-e-Dehli, is in the town.

== Economy ==
Farming is the primary source of income in the town. The farmers use both old and modern techniques for cultivation, and nowadays some of the educated people are joining the farming industry and bringing new technologies.

Sugarcane is the primary crop farmed. Residents are known to shop at the market in nearby Ichalkaranji, in the State of Maharashtra.

== Notable people ==
- Acharya Vidyasagar - Digambara Jain Acharya. His birth site is now a temple and a museum.
- A.N. Upadhye - Jain Scholar
