= Gyansagar =

Indian Jain acharya (1891–1973)

Acharya Shri 108 Gyansagar Ji Maharaj
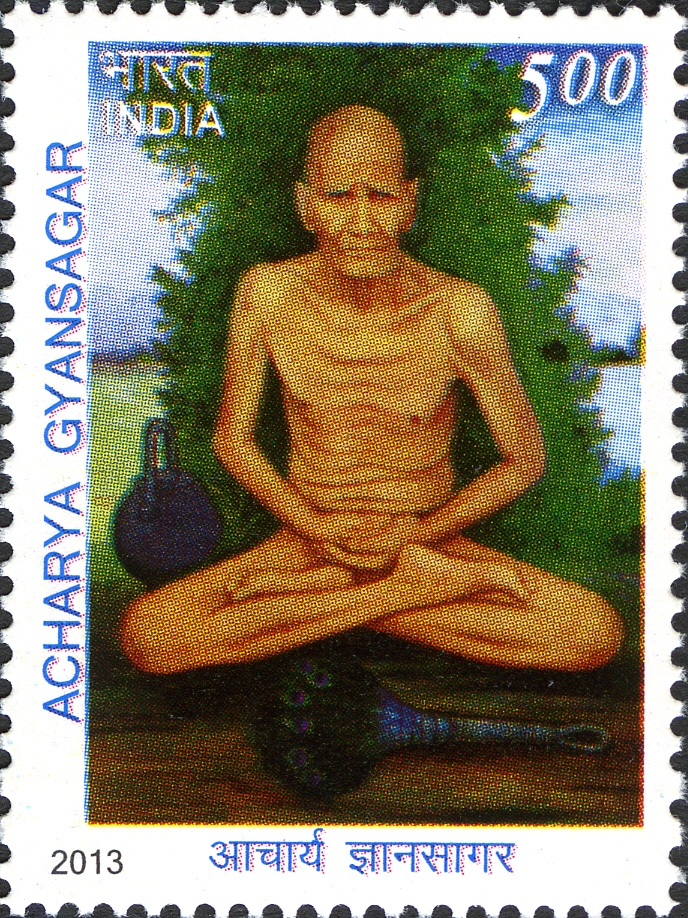
- Gyansagar on a 2013 stamp of India

Personal life
- Born: Bhooramal Chhabda; 1891 Ranoli, Sikar Rajasthan
- Died: 1973 (aged 81–82) Nasirabad, Ajmer Rajasthan
- Parents: Chaturbhuj (father); Ghritbhari Devi (mother)

Religious life
- Religion: Jainism
- Sect: Digambara
- Initiation as Muni: 1959; Khaniya ji, Jaipur by Acharya Shivsagar
- Initiation as Kshullak: Gyanbhushan by Acharya Veersagar

Religious career
- Predecessor: Acharya Shivsagar
- Successor: Acharya Vidyasagar
- Ascetics initiated: Acharya Vidyasagar

Acharya Jnansagar or Gyansagar (1891–1973) was a Digambara Jain Acharya of 20th century who composed many Sanskrit epics. He initiated Acharya Vidyasagar in 1968 as a monk and 1972 as an Acharya.

== Biography ==
Acharya Gyansagar Ji Maharaj was born on 24 August 1897 (Bhadrapada Krishna Ekadashi) in the village of Ranoli, Sikar district, Rajasthan. His childhood name was Bhoormal Chhawda (also known as Shanti Kumar). His father was Chaturbhuj Chhawda and his mother was Ghrithvari Devi. He was the second of five brothers in a modest, middle-class family.

From an early age, Bhoormal displayed a calm and humble nature, spoke sweetly, and was deeply interested in acquiring knowledge. His early education took place in his village, but he had to discontinue studies after his father's death when he was just 10. To support the family, his elder brother went to Gaya (Bihar), and Bhoormal later joined him there. Due to financial constraints, his studies paused temporarily.

However, determined to pursue higher learning, Bhoormal moved to Varanasi at the age of 15 and enrolled in Syadvad Mahavidyalaya. To support himself, he sold towels on the ghats of the Ganga while studying. He specialized in Jain grammar, logic, and literature, and earned a Shastri degree from Queens College, Kashi, along with advanced education in Jain philosophy and Sanskrit literature.

During his academic journey, he resolved to address the lack of Jain poetic literature and took a lifelong vow of celibacy and service to Jain Dharma. He worked to include Jain grammar and logic in the curriculum of Kashi University. After completing his education, he returned to his village, taught Jain children selflessly, and supported his family through a joint business with his elder brother.

Eventually, he dedicated himself entirely to teaching and writing. He was invited to teach Sanskrit at Ramgarh in Rajasthan, where he declined any salary. Alongside teaching, he composed several works in Sanskrit and Hindi to enrich Jain literature.

He was initiated as a kshullak (junior monk) by Acharya Veersagar of the Acharya Shantisagar lineage and was named Kshullak Gyanbhushan. After serving as kshullak and ailak for four years, he was initiated as a muni (full monk) by Acharya Shivsagar in 1959 in Khaniya Ji, Jaipur. He was later elevated to Acharya status on 7 February 1969 at Nasirabad, Rajasthan by the local Jain community.

He was a revered scholar, poet, and spiritual leader. Acharya Gyansagar composed numerous Sanskrit epics and Jain texts at a time when Sanskrit composition was nearly obsolete. Toward the end of his life, he humbly requested his own disciple, Acharya Vidyasagar Ji Maharaj, to grant him samadhi-maran (spiritual death). Acharya Gyansagar Ji is also the grand-guru of Muni Pranamya Sagar Ji Maharaj.

== Works ==
As an expert in Sanskrit, he had been a great composer in Sanskrit. At least 30 researchers have studied his works and were honored doctoral degrees. At least 300 scholars have presented research papers on his work.
His works includes 4 Sanskrit epics and 3 more Jain texts and that too in the time when the Sanskrit composition was almost obsolete. These creations have always surprised the modern Sanskrit scholars.

== Stamp ==
An official Government of India stamp in his memory was issues by minister Sachin Pilot on September 10, 2013, at Kishangarh Rajasthan. He thus became the first Digambar Jain Acharya to have a stamp released in his memory.

== Tradition ==
He belongs to the tradition established by Acharya Shantisagar:

1. Acharya Shantisagar
2. Acharya Virsagar
3. Acharya Shivsagar
4. Acharya Gyansagar
5. Acharya Vidyasagar
