= Kshamasagar =

Indian Jain monk (1957–2015)

Muni Shri 108 Kshamasagar Ji Maharaj
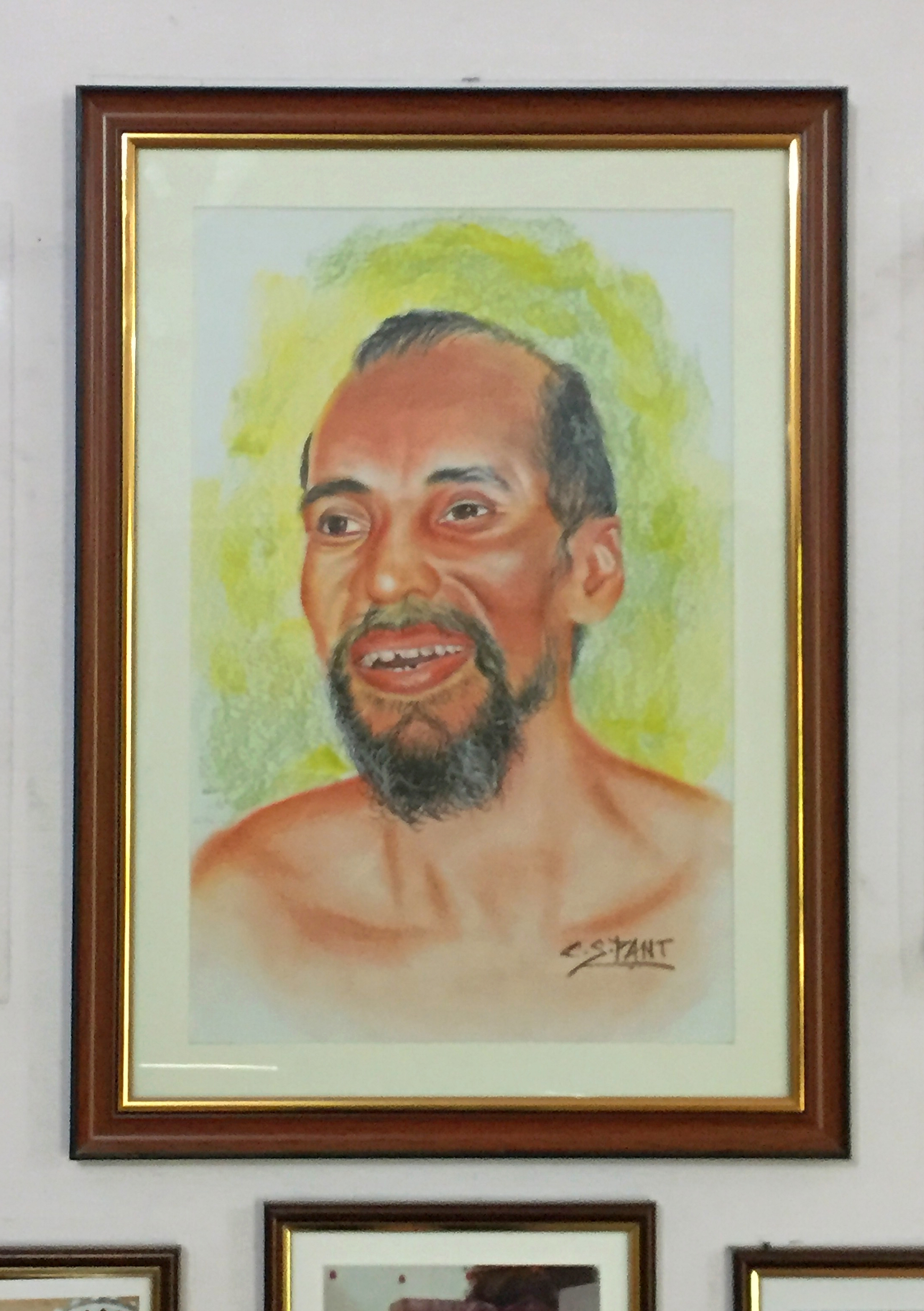
- A painting of Kshamasagar at Nainagiri

Personal life
- Born: Virendra Kumar Singhai; 20 September 1957 Sagar, Madhya Pradesh, India
- Died: 13 March 2015 (aged 57) (Samadhi-maran)
- Parents: Jeevan Kumar Singhai (father); Asha Devi (mother)

Religious life
- Religion: Jainism
- Sect: Digambara
- Initiation: 20 August 1982 by Acharya Vidyasagar

Muni Shri 108 Kshamasagar ji Maharaj was a Digambara monk initiated by Shri 108 Acharya Vidyasagar ji Maharaj. He is also known for his poetry and writings which are widely quoted.

== Life ==
Kshamasagar was born in the city of Sagar, Madhya Pradesh on 20 September 1957. His father Jeevan lal Singhai was a nephew of famous Sagar philanthropist Singhai Kundanlal, who was a longtime supporter of Ganesh Varni.

He was initiated as a Digambara monk on 20 August 1982 by Acharya Vidyasagar. He did his M. Tech from Sagar University and renounced the worldly life soon afterwards.

He opted Santhara (also called Sallekhna) and died on 13 March 2015 at 6.00 AM in Moraji Jain temple during his Chaturmas period. More than 50,000 people attended his funeral proceedings afterwards.

== Works ==
Kshamasagar wrote "In Quest of the Self: The Life Story of Acharya Shri Vidyasagar" (आत्मान्वेषी), a biography of his teacher Āchārya Vidyadagar and was published by Bhartiya Jnanpith.

His poems have been collected and published in Hindi and English. His poetry works include the following published books.

1. "Pagdandi Suraj Tak" (1992)
2. "Muni Kshamasagar ki Kavitayen" (1996).
3. Mukti (2000)
4. "Apna Ghar" (2005)
5. "Aur Aur Apna" (2016)
6. "Karam Kaise Karein" is a collection of his discourses.
7. He also wrote "Jain Darshan Paribhashika Kosh".

There is a famous quote dedicated to Acharya Vidyasagar by him.

दीप उनका, रौशनी उनकी, मै जल रहा हूँ |

रास्ते उनके, सहारा भी उनका, मै चल रहा हूँ |

प्राण उनके हर साँस उनकी, मै जी रहा हूँ |

== Sources ==
- Kshamasagar (2007), In Quest of Self : The life story of Acharya Shri Vidyasagar, Delhi: Bhartiya Jnanpith, ISBN 978-81-263-1166-8
- Muni Kshamasagar's Bio on Maitree Samooh
