= Shantisagar =

Indian Jain acharya

Charitra Chakravarti Acharya 108 Shri Shantisagar Ji Maharaj
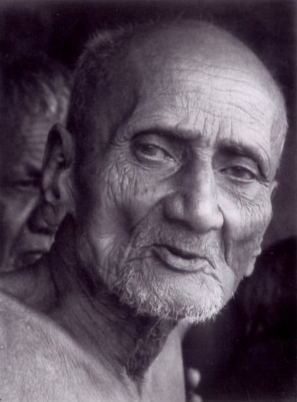
- Photograph taken by Shri Arvind Raoji Doshi (at his age of 15yr), son of Late Shri Raoji Sakharam Doshi, at Kunthalgiri in 1955, during the 22nd day of the Sallekhana period of Acharya Shri 108 Shantisagar Ji Maharaj.

Personal life
- Born: Satgauda; 23 July 1872 Bhoj Karnataka, Mysore Presidency, British India (today in Belgaum district, Karnataka, India)
- Died: 18 September 1955 (aged 82–83) (Samadhi-maran) Kunthalgiri, Bombay State, India
- Cremation place: Kunthalgiri, Maharashtra
- Parents: Bhimagauda Patil (father); Satyavati (mother)

Religious life
- Religion: Jainism
- Sect: Digambara
- Initiation: 1919; Yarnal by Devendrakirti
- Initiation: 1915

Religious career
- Successor: Virasagar
- Initiated: Virasagar, Nemisagar

Acharya Shri Shantisagar Ji (1872–1955) was an Indian Acharya of the Digambara monk faith. Shanti Sagar ji revived the teaching and practice of traditional Digambara practices in North India. He was lustrated as a kshullaka into the Sangha (holy order) by Devappa (Devakirti) Swami Ji. He took his ailaka deeksha (religious vows) by Acharya Shri 108 Aadisagar Ji (Ankalikar), who was the first acharya of 20th century, after visiting Shri Girnar Ji Siddhkshetra. In about 1920, Shantisagar Ji became a Digambara muni (sadhu). In 1922, at Yarnal village, Belgaum district, Karnataka, he was given the name "Shanti Sagar Ji".

== Early life ==
Shantisagar Ji was born in 1872 near Bhoj village in what is now Belgavi district in Karnataka, India. His father either worked as a farmer or was employed in the clothing business. At age eighteen, having read religious texts and undergone several pilgrimages, Shantisagar Ji decided to dedicate his life to a religious order.

Shantisagar Ji's parents died in 1912. He then traveled to the Jain holy place, Shravanabelagola, a town in Hassan district, Karnataka, India. In 1918, whilst in Shravanabelagola, Shantisagar Ji was initiated as a kshullaka into the Sangha (holy order) by Devappa (Devendrakirti) Swami Ji. He took his ailaka deeksha (religious vows) by Acharya Shri 108 Aadisagar Ji (Ankalikar), who was the first acharya of 20th century, after visiting Shri Girnar Ji Siddhkshetra In about 1920, Shantisagar became a muni (monk) of the Digambara sect. In 1922, at Yarnal village, Belgaum district, Karnataka, he was given the name "Shanti Sagar".

He preached the principles of digamber religion in various parts of India and became an Acharya. His disciples also called him "Charitra Chakravarti" ("Emperor of good character"). He has also been called "muniraj" ("King among Ascetics"), and "silasindhi" ("Ocean of Observances").

He began a hunger strike to oppose restrictions imposed on Digambar monks by the British Raj.

== His Vihar throughout India ==
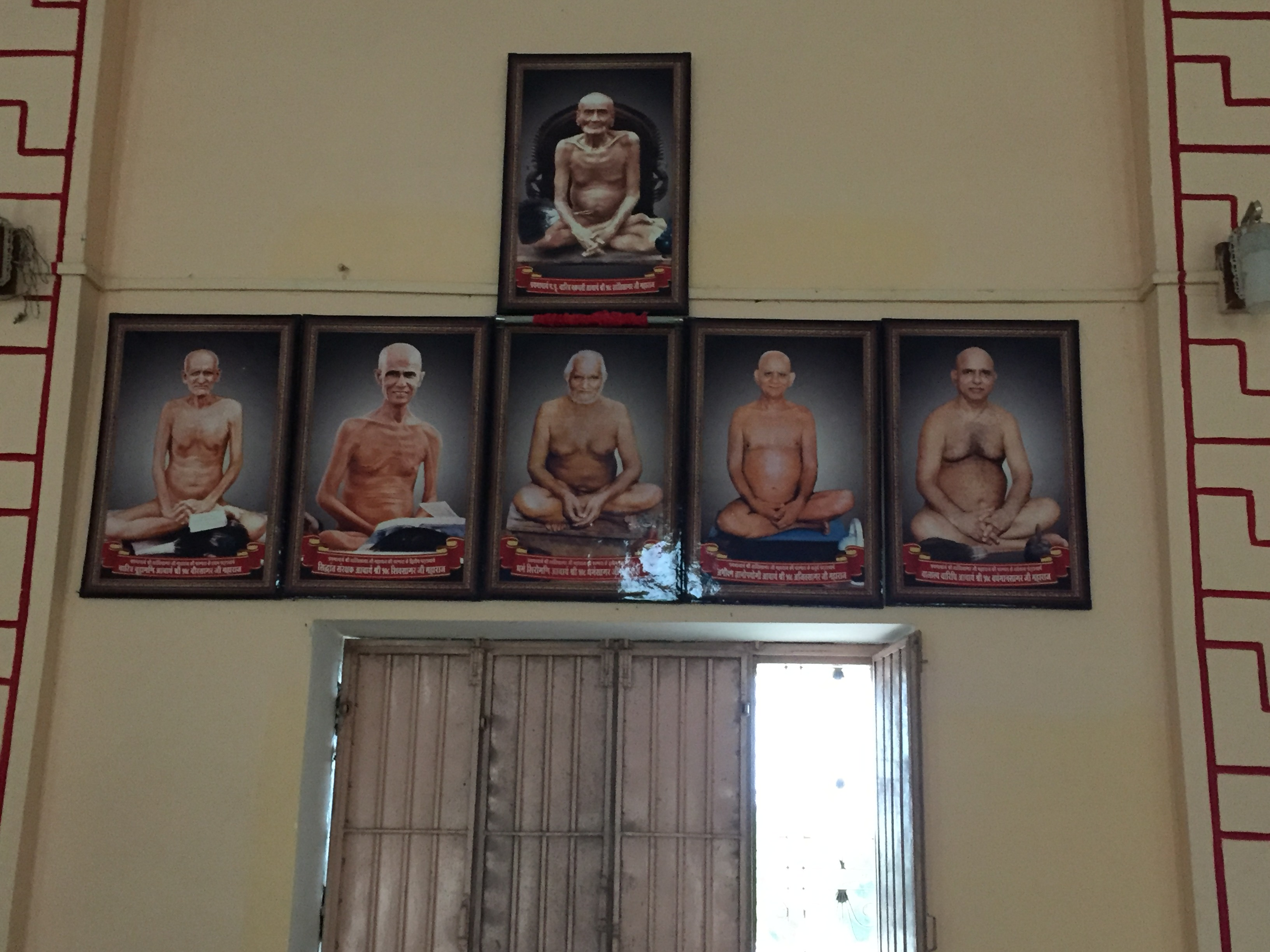
Acharyas of the Shantisagar parampara, Virasagar, Shivsagar, Dharmsagar, Ajitsagar, Vardhmansagar, Posters at Paporaji

He was the first Digambar Jain monk in the 20th Century to wander throughout India. The wandering of a digamber monk is termed "Vihara" an old sramanic term. Padmanabh Jaini writes:

Shantisagara has owned nothing, not even a loincloth, since 1920. He has wandered on foot over the length and breadth of India, receiving food offerings but once a day, and then with only his bare hands for a bowl; he has spoken little during daylight hours and not at all after sunset.

— Padmanabh S. Jaini

Acharya Shantisagar Ji took last breath on 18 September 1955 at 6:50 am at Kunthalgiri, Osmanabad district, Maharashtra, India.

Based on the accounts given by Sumeruchandra Diwakar and Dharmachanda Shastri, Shantisagar was born in 1872 to Bhimagauda Patil and Satyavati at Bhoj Village in Belgavi dist., Karnataka, India. His birth name was Satgauda. He was married at the age of nine. His wife died six months after the marriage. In 1905, he made a pilgrimage to Digambar Teerth Sammed Shikharji accompanied by his sister.

In 1925, Shantisagar Ji was present in Kumbhoj township. He attended the Mahamastakabhisheka (grand consecration) at Shravanbelgola, Karnataka. In 1926, he visited Nanded city, Maharashtra. In 1927, he visited Bahubali, Maharashtra and then Nagpur which was then the capital of the Central provinces. Shantisagar then travelled in east India.He also travelled to tirth Champapur and Pavapur.

In 1928, Shantisagar Ji visited central India. He visited towns including Katni in Madhya Pradesh state, Jabalpur, Sleemanabad, Nohta, Kundalpur and Sagar. In Dronagir, Shantisagar encountered a tiger. By 1929, Shantisagar Ji was in Lalitpur. In Sonagir, four ailaks (researchers). By 1929, Shantisagar Ji was visiting Gwalior and Murena.

Shantisagar Ji travelled to north India. In Rajakheda, Uttar Pradesh, Shantisagar was attacked by a violent crowd. Shantisagar Ji visited Agra, Hastinapur and Firozabad. In 1930, Shantisagar Ji visited Mathura and received a blessing. Shantisagarji's presence in Delhi in 1931 is marked by a memorial at Lal Mandir.

In the 1930s, Shantisagar Ji travelled through Western India. He visited the Digambar Jain Atishay Kshetra Shri Mahaveer Ji temple, a pilgrimage site. ShantisagarJi visited Jaipur in 1932, Byavur in 1933, Udaipur in 1934, Goral in Gujarat in 1935, Pratapgarh in 1936 and Gajpantha in Maharashtra in 1937. Around this time, Shri Shantisagar Charitr was written by Muni Kunthusagar in Sanskrit and in Gajpantha, Shantisagarji was given the title, "Charitra Chakravarti". In 1938, Shantisagarji visited Baramati, Indore city in Madhya Pradesh. In 1939, he visited Pratapgarh in Uttar Pradesh.

In the 1940s, Shantisagar Ji travelled through Maharashtra state. He visited Goral in 1940, Akluj in 1941, Korochi in 1942, Digraj in 1943, Kunthalgiri in 1944, temple Phaltan in 1945, and Kavalana in 1946. Then in 1947, at the time of Partition, Shantisagarji was in Sholapur. In a miracle, in Shantisagarji's presence, a mute young man began to speak. In 1948, Shantisagarji was in Phaltan. He was in Kavlana in 1949.

In the 1950s, Shantisagarji continued to travel in Maharashtra state. He was in Gajpantha in 1950, Baramati in 1951, Lonand in 1952, and Kunthalgiri in 1953. In 1953, Sumeruchandra Diwakar's book, Charitra Chakravarti was published. In 1954, there was preservation of the Dhavala books.

== Sallekhana Or Samadhi ==
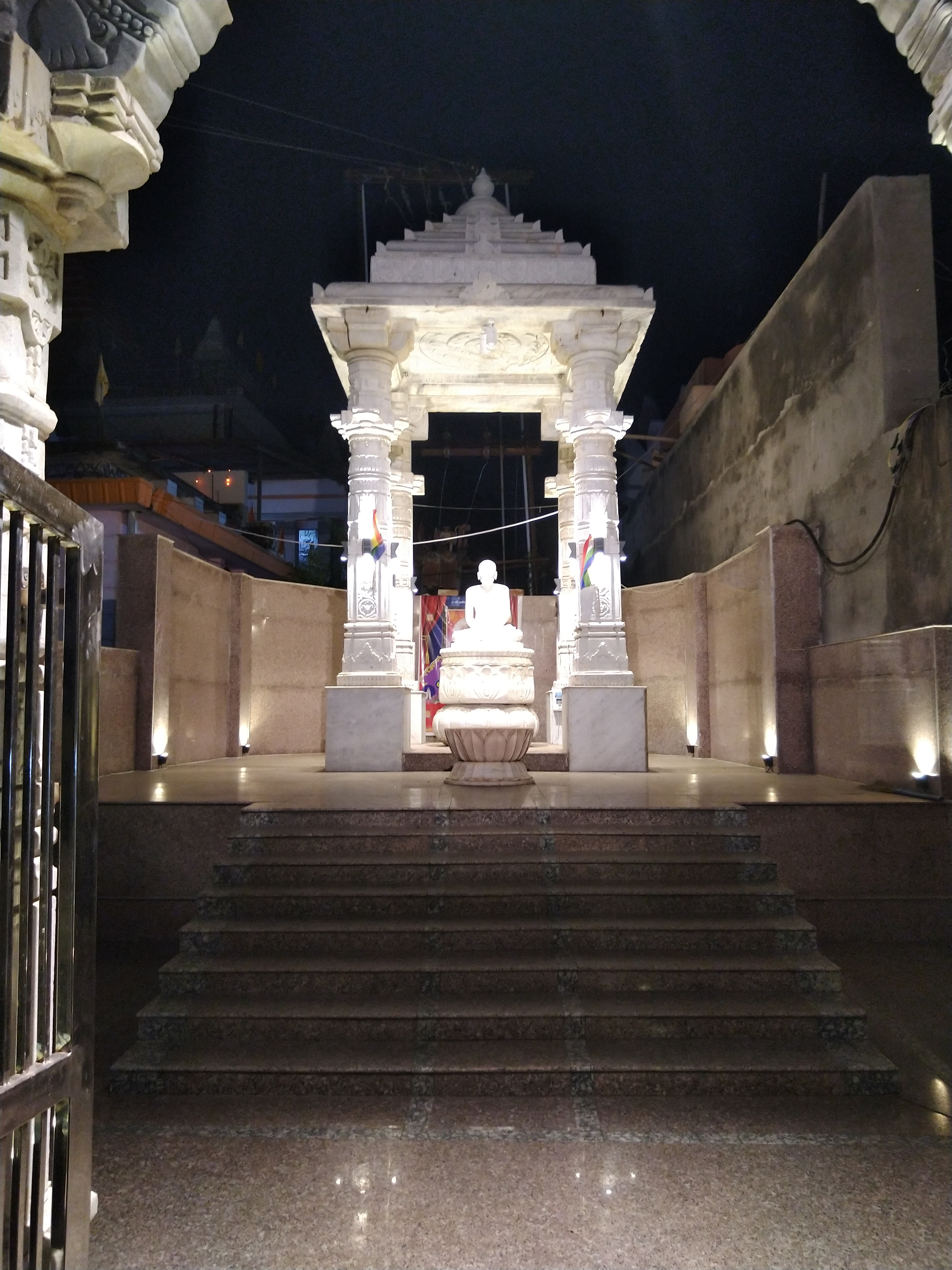
Vimalsagar Memorial Temple at Madhuban, Jharkhand, India

In 1955, Shantisagarji arrived in Kunthalgiri town. On 18 September 1955, he completed the practice of samadhi, a gradual reducing of intake of fluid and food leading to death. Sumeruchandra Diwakar, Bhattarakas Lakshmisen and Jinasen arrived in the town. Acharya Shantisagar Ji attained utkrushta samadhimaran after the 35th / 36th day of fasting. The title of Acharya pada (teacher of philosophy) was awarded to Muni Virasagar Ji.

Padmanabh Jaini writes about his Sallekhana:

It is 23 August 1955. On the holy mount of Kunthalagiri, in the state of Maharashtra in India, a man of great soul called Shantisagara (Ocean of peace) is ritually fasting to death. He is the Acharya (spiritual leader) of the Digambara community; now, after thirty-five years as a mendicant, he is attaining his mortal end in the holy manner prescribed by the great Mahavira almost 2,500 years earlier. From August 14 until September 7 he takes only water; then, unable to drink without help, he ceases even that. At last, fully conscious and chanting the digamber a litany, he dies in the early morning of September 18. The holiness and propriety of his life and of the manner of his death are widely known and admired by digambras throughout India.

— Padmanabh S. Jaini

== His lineage (parampara) ==
He had handed over the leadership to Acharya Virasagar Ji (1856–1957). He was followed by, in sequence, Acharya Shivsagar Ji (1888–1969), Acharya Dharmasagar Ji (1914–1987), Acharya Ajitasagar Ji (1987–1990) and then Acharya Vardhamansagar Ji (since 1990) who currently leads his sangha. There are numerous Digambar monks who belong to this tradition.

== Acharya Aadisagar Ankalikar Ji (1809–1887) ==
He was the first acharya of the 20th Century and he took munidiksha at Kunthalgiri siddhkshetra all alone by himself and became the first acharya in the year 1915 (the same year in which Acharya shanti sagar ji received muni diksha) at Kadgemela, Jaisinghpur, Maharashtra. He revived digambar Jain ascetic tradition. He used to have only one food item (for example mango juice, aamras) that too in 8 days. Acharya shri Mahavirkirtji, Acharya Vimalsagar Ji (1915–1994) belonged to his lineage followed by Tapasvi samrat Acharya shri 108 Sanmati sagar ji maharaj, who did the most tapasya (penance) after Tirthankar Mahavir, followed by Acharya shri 108 Sunil sagarji maharaj, who is the current leader of the ascetic lineage.

== Acharya Shantisagarji Chhani ==
Acharya Shantisagar Ji is sometimes termed Acharya Shantisagar Ji (Dakshin) to contrast him with Acharya Shantisagar Ji "Chhani" (North) (1888–1944). Chhani is a district in Udaipur. They were thus contemporary. Sarakoddharak Acharya Gyansagar Ji (born 1957) was initially initiated by Acharya Vidyasagar Ji as a Brahmachari, later he was initiated as a Digambar Muni by Acharya Sumatisagar Ji (1917–1994) belonging to the lineage of Acharya Shantisagar Ji Chhani.

== See also ==
- Bhadrabahu Ji
- Kundakunda Ji
