= A. N. Upadhye =

Indian Jainalogy Scholar

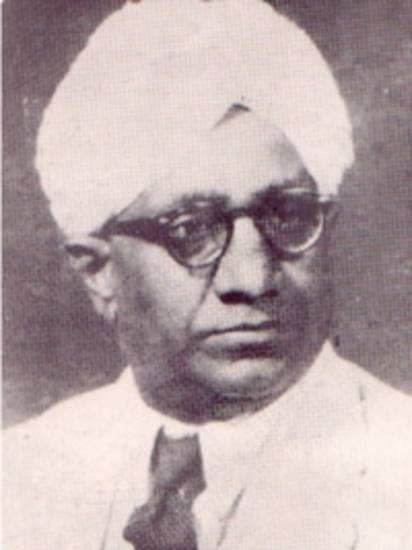
- Born: 6 February 1906
- Died: 8 October 1975 (aged 69)
- Education: Gilginchi Artal High School, Belgaum

Adinatha Neminatha Upadhye (6 February 1906 – 08 Oct 1975), known as A. N. Upadhye was a scholar of Prakrit, Jainology and dedicated himself to Jaina studies and wrote many books on Jainology in Kannada and English. He was the President of 46th Kannada Sahitya Sammelana which was held at Shravanabelagola in 1967.

== Early life ==
He was born in the family of Jaina Priests (Upadhyaya) on 6 February, 1906 in Sadalga in Chikkodi Taluka of Belgaum District. His primary education in Kannada was provided by his parents.

== Education ==
Upadhye completed his primary education in Sadalaga and Secondary Education at Gilginchi Artal High School, Belgaum. He then went on to receive his Bachelor of Arts with Honours from Bombay University in Sanskrit and Prakrit languages. Later, he moved to Pune for Post-Graduation and joined Bhandarkar Oriental Research Institute. In 1930, he completed a Master of Arts from the same university in Sanskrit and Prakrit languages.

== Career ==
Upadhye began his career as a Lecturer of Prakrit at Rajaram College, Kolhapur in 1930. He served full 32 years in Rajaram College and received D.Litt. Degree from Bombay University in 1939. He dedicated himself as Springer Research Scholar of Bombay University from 1939 to 1942. He retired from Rajaram College in 1962 after 32 years of loyal service. Later, he joined Shivaji University as a Professor Emeritus from 1962 to 1971, during this period he served as Dean of Arts Department as well. He worked closely with A. G. Pawar, then Vice-Chancellor of Shivaji University and also worked hard to lay a strong foundation for newly formed University.

== Final Years and Death ==
In 1971, Upadhye became a founding professor and Head of the Jaina Chair at the University of Mysore. In this role, he was the driving force behind the establishment of the University's post-graduate Department of Jainalogy and Prankrit. His life and work was portrayed in the Marathi book "Charitra Tyanche Paha Jara".

Within days of retiring from Mysore University, Upadhye died of a heart attack on 08-Oct-1975 at his home in Kolhapur.

== Bibliography ==
- Hariṣeṇa. Bṛhatkathākoṣa, ed. A. N. Upadhye, Bombay, 1943.
- Haribhadra. Dhūrtākhyāna, ed. A. N. Upadhye, Bombay, 1944.
- Devasena. Darśanasāra, ed. A. N. Upadhye, Annals of the Bhandarkar Oriental Institute 15 (1935):198–206.
- Siddhasena Divākara. Dvātriṃśikā, in A. N. Upadhye (1971).
- Śubhacandra. Jñānārṇava, ed. H. L. Jain, Kailashchandra Siddhantacharya and A. N. Upadhye, Sholapur, 1977.
- Svāmikumāra. Kārttikeyānuprekṣā, ed. A. N. Upadhye, Agas, 1978.
- Yogīndu. Paramātmaprakāśa, ed. A. N. Upadhye, Bombay, 1937.
- Kundakunda. Pravacanasāra with Amṛtacandra’s commentary, ed. A. N. Upadhye, Bombay, 1935.
- Ṣaṭkhaṇḍāgama, vols 2 and 3, ed. H. Jain, A. N. Upadhye and K. Siddhantashastri, Sholapur, 1976 and 1980
- Jaṭāsiṁhanāndin, Varāṅgacaritra, ed. by A. N. Upadhye
- Rāmapāṇivāda, Kaṁsavaho, ed. by A. N. Upadhye
- Līlāvatī, Kutūhala, ed. by A. N. Upadhye
