= Yarnal =

- Village
- Location in Karnataka, India Yarnal (India)
- Coordinates: 16°36′N 75°51′E
- Country: India
- State: Karnataka
- District: Vijayapura
- Talukas: Basavana Bagewadi

Languages
  - Official: Kannada
- Time zone: UTC+5:30 (IST)

Yarnal is a village in Vijaypur district in the southern state of Karnataka, India.
