= Acharya Vidyasagar =

Indian Jain monk (1946–2024)

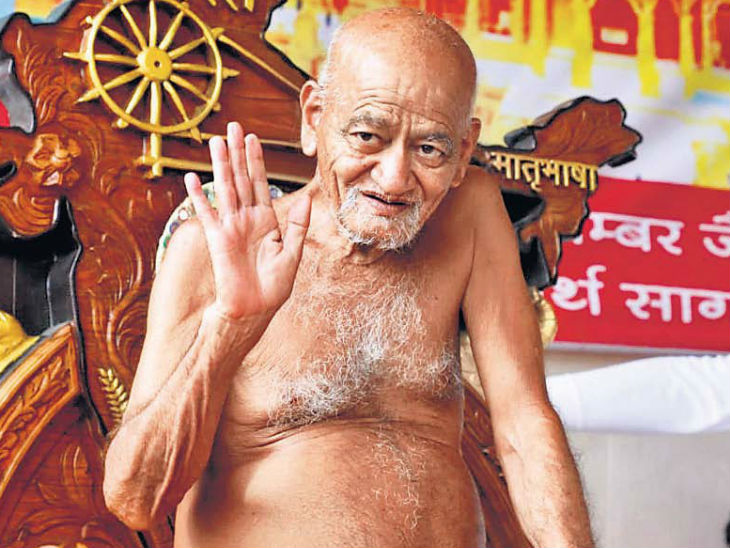

Personal life
- Born: Vidyadhar; 10 October 1946 Sadalga, Belgaum district, Mysuru State, British India
- Died: 18 February 2024 (aged 77) Chandragiri, Rajnandgaon district, Chhattisgarh, India
- Resting place: Chandragiri, Dongargarh, India
- Parents: Mallappa (father); Shrimanti (mother)
- Notable work: Mukamati (silent soil)
- Website: vidyasagar.guru

Religious life
- Religion: Jainism
- Sect: Digambara
- Initiation: 30 June 1968; Ajmer by Acharya Gyansagar

Religious career
- Predecessor: Muni Gyansagar
- Successor: Muni Samaysagar
- Disciples: Pramansagar, Sudhasagar, Kshamasagar, Guptisagar

Acharya Vidyasagar (10 October 1946 – 18 February 2024) was an influential Indian Digambara Jain acharya (monk), credited with having brought about a revival in educational and religious activities in Digambara Jainism. He wrote the epic Hindi poem Mukamati.

== Early life ==
Vidyasagar was born on 10 October 1946 during the full moon festival (Sharad Purnima) in Sadalga, in the Belgaum district, of Karnataka in a Kannada-speaking Jain family. The modest house where he was born, is now a temple and a museum.

His childhood name was Vidyadhar. He was the second of four sons, the eldest son being Mahavira Ashtage and the younger ones Anantanath and Shantinath. As a child, he was fond of eating fresh butter which was used to make ghee (clarified butter). He was not a demanding child and accepted what was given to him. Vidyadhar used to visit temples and teach his younger siblings the principles of religion. He called both younger sisters "Akka" (elder sister). He was attentive and was eager to undertake his studies. In his spare time he used to paint.

== Monastic career ==
=== Initiation ===
Vidyasagar was initiated as a Digambara monk in 1968 at the age of 22 by Acharya Acharya Gyanasagar, who belonged to the lineage of Acharya Shantisagar, at Ajmer. His father Mallappa, his mother Shrimati, and two sisters took diksha and joined the sangha (community of the pious) of Acharya Dharmasagar. All of his brothers, Anantanath, Shantinath and Mahavir Ashtage followed him and were initiated by Acharya Vidyasagar as Muni Yog Sagar. Muni Samay Sagar, and Muni Utkrasht Sagar respectively.

He was elevated to the Acharya status in 1972.

=== Ascetic practices and travels ===
Acharya Vidyasagar made very strict rules for his ascetic life. He never drank milk. He also did not consume curd, green vegetables, ghee and dry fruits. He also drank water only once a day by filling it with his palm and finger. He used to eat very limited quantity of plain dal and roti. He travelled across the country barefoot.

The Acharya did not eat salt, sugar, fruits, milk, oil, ghee, in addition to what is traditionally prohibited (root vegetable and Panchudambar fal). He went out for a meal at about 9:30 a.m.–10:00 a.m. from Śrāvakas (lay votaries). He took food once a day in the palm of his hand, one morsel at a time.

Vidyasagar slept on the floor or a wooden platform without any mattress or pillow. As a Digambar monk, for discourses he was provided a raised wooden seat without any padding.

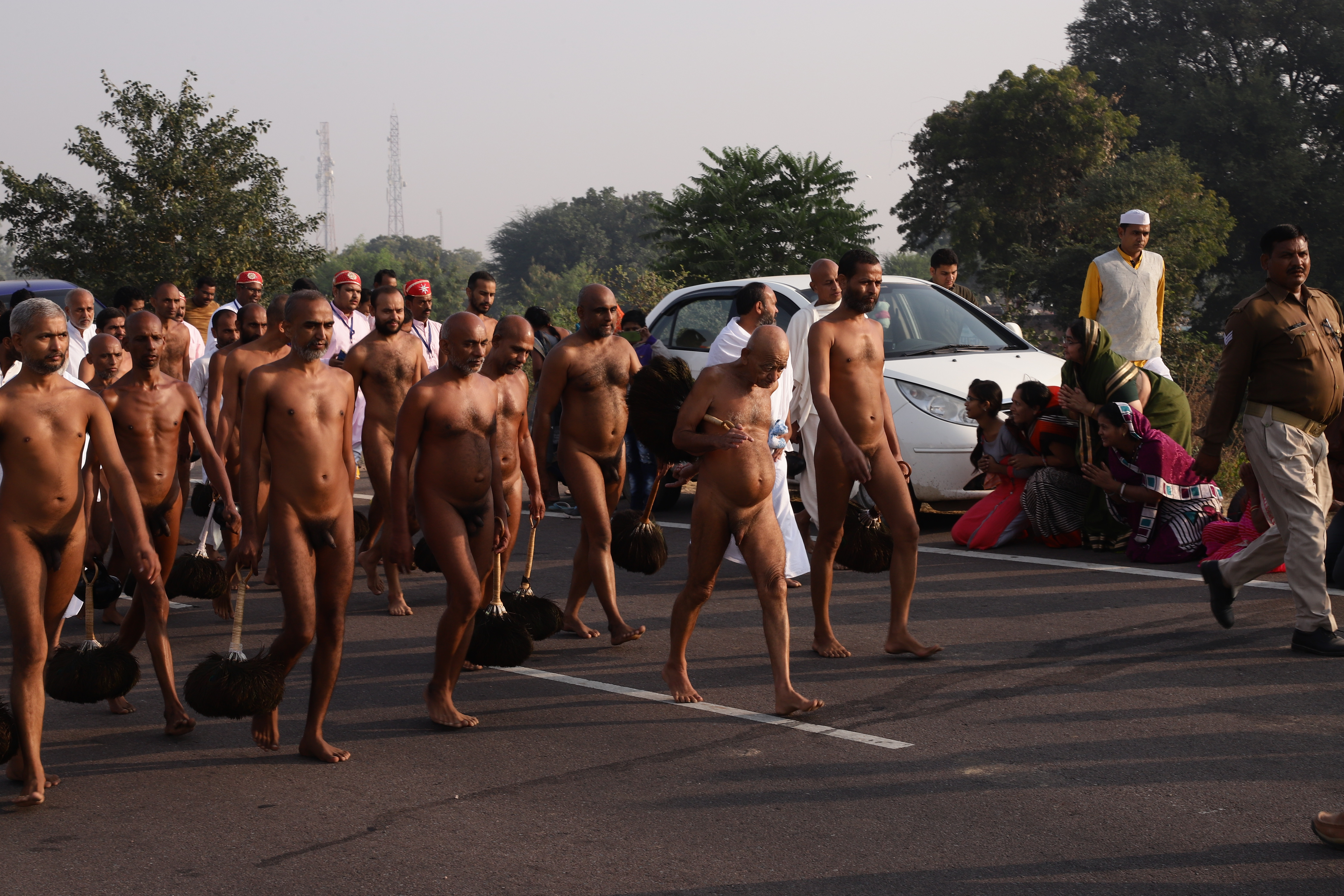
Acharya Vidyasagar leading his sangha during his vihara, passers-by kneel in reverence

As a traditional Digambara Jain monk, Acharya Vidyasagar never stayed in a single location for more than a few days, except for the four months of the rainy season (Chaturmas). He never declared where he would be next, although people tried to guess his next destination. After his initiation in 1968 he had: seven Chaturmas in Rajasthan (1968–74); one in Uttar Pradesh (1974); seven in Madhya Pradesh (1976–1982); one in Jharkhand (1983); nine in Madhya Pradesh again (1984–1992); two in Maharashtra (1993–94); one in Madhya Pradesh (1995); one in Gujarat (1996); 11 again in Madhya Pradesh (1997–2007); one again in Maharashtra (2008); and eight again in Madhya Pradesh (2009–2016).

== Social and educational initiatives ==
Acharya Vidyasagar catalyzed several large-scale socio-economic and educational networks aimed at poverty alleviation, animal welfare, and female empowerment. His approach to social reform was characterized by the integration of Jain philosophical principles with contemporary developmental needs. To promote women's empowerment through education, he inspired the founding of Pratibhasthali Gyanodaya Vidyapeeth. This initiative operates as a network of girls' residential schools across central India, with prominent campuses located in Jabalpur, Dongargarh, Ramtek, Paporaji, and Indore. The institutional framework integrates modern academic curricula with ancient Indian value-based principles.

As an advocate for non-violence (ahimsa) and compassion for all living beings (jeeva daya), he inspired the establishment of the Dayoday Mahasangh. This organization operates an extensive network of over 100 cowsheds (gaushalas) dedicated to providing shelter and medical rehabilitation for cattle. His welfare efforts toward animal rescue and rural poverty alleviation received widespread recognition from national leadership.

Emphasizing economic self-reliance, he spearheaded the revival of traditional handloom (hathkargha) industries to generate non-violent rural employment. He inspired the opening of cooperative training centers to teach weaving skills and reverse urban migration. This handloom initiative was also extended to state prisons, where inmates were trained in handloom weaving to assist in their economic and moral rehabilitation. The apparel produced through these cottage industry initiatives is marketed under the "Shramdaan" brand, signifying the voluntary donation of labor for self-employment.

== Literary works ==
Acharya VidyasagaraJi was a scholar of Sanskrit and Prakrit and knew several languages including Hindi, Kannada, Marathi and English. He wrote in languages such as Prakrit, Sanskrit, and Hindi. His works include Niranjana Shataka, Bhavana Shataka, Parishah Jaya Shataka, Suniti Shataka and Shramana Shataka.

He composed nearly 700 haiku poems which are unpublished.

He wrote the Hindi epic poem titled Mukamati. This has been included in the syllabus of Hindi MA programmes at various institutions. This has been translated into English by Lal Chandra Jain and was presented to Pratibha Patil, the President of India.

== Monastic lineage ==
Acharya Vidyasagar belongs to the tradition established by Acharya ShantisagarJi. Acharya Shantisagar initiated Acharya Virasagar, who was then succeeded by Acharya Shivsagar, Acharya Gyansagar and finally Acharya Vidyasagar.

Some of his disciples are well-known scholars in their own right. As of 2001, about 21% of all the Digambara monks were under Acharya Vidyasagar. Muni Sudhasagar and Muni Pramansagar are also his disciples. One of his best known disciples was Muni Kshamasagar who died in 2015.

Acharya Pushadantasagar, the guru of Muni Tarun Sagar, was initiated as a kshullak (junior monk) by Acharya Vidyasagar, although he took muni diksha from Acharya Vimal Sagar. Upadhyaya Guptisagar took muni diksha in 1982 from Acharya Vidyasagar although he later joined the sangha (community) of Acharya Vidyanand.

Acharya Vidyasagar has been a source of inspiration to the people for founding institutions for their welfare at different locations. Since the number of monks (munis) and nuns (āryikas) initiated and directed by him exceeds two hundred (117 Digambar Muni, 172 Aryikas), they stay in more than 60 locations in India. This ensures that only a few monks or nuns are staying in one place.

Acharya Vidyasagar gave carried out most Digambara monk initiations in the country, amounting to 505.

== Death ==
Acharya Vidyasagar died in Dongargarh on 18 February 2024 at the age of 77, after three days of fast (sallekhana). Before his death, he nominated Muni Samaysagar as his successor on 6 February 2024.

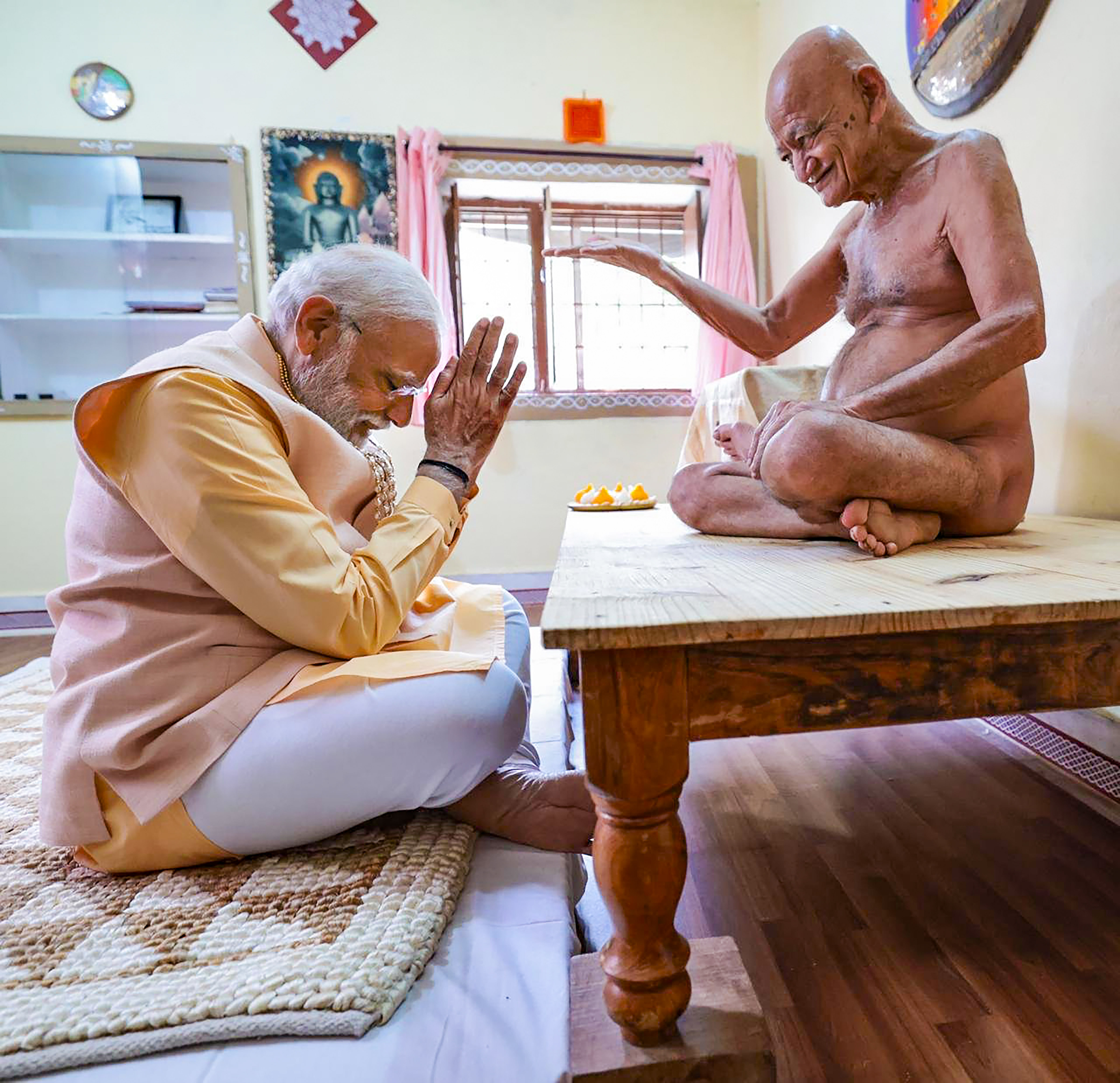
PM Modi with Acharya Vidyasagar, Nov 2023

His death met with formal condolences from the Prime Minister of India Narendra Modi who wrote: "He [Acharya Vidyasagar] will be remembered by the coming generations for his invaluable contributions to society, especially his efforts towards spiritual awakening among people, his work towards poverty alleviation, healthcare, education and more." Modi also wrote an article about Vidyasagar's impact on the society. Condolences were sent also by the Governor and Chief Minister of Uttar Pradesh. A one-minute silence was observed at the BJP's National Convention 2024 in Delhi. The Chhattisgarh and Madhya Pradesh Governments declared a half-day state mourning.

== Legacy and recognition ==
He was visited by Indian government officials, including Prime Minister Atal Bihari Vajpayee in 1999, Prime Minister Narendra Modi in 2016, Union minister Jyotiraditya Scindia in 2016, Union Minister Uma Bharati in 2018, Chief Minister of Madhya Pradesh Digvijay Singh in 2018, Congress State President Kamal Nath in 2019, Chief Minister of Uttar Pradesh Yogi Adityanath in 2018, Union Home Minister Rajnath Singh in 2019, Lok Sabha Speaker Om Birla in 2019, Chief Minister of Madhya Pradesh Kamal Nath in 2020, and Prime Minister Narendra Modi again in 2023.

On 28 July 2016, he gave a religious speech (pravachana) in the Madhya Pradesh Legislative Assembly by invitation from Chief Minister Shivraj Singh Chouhan.

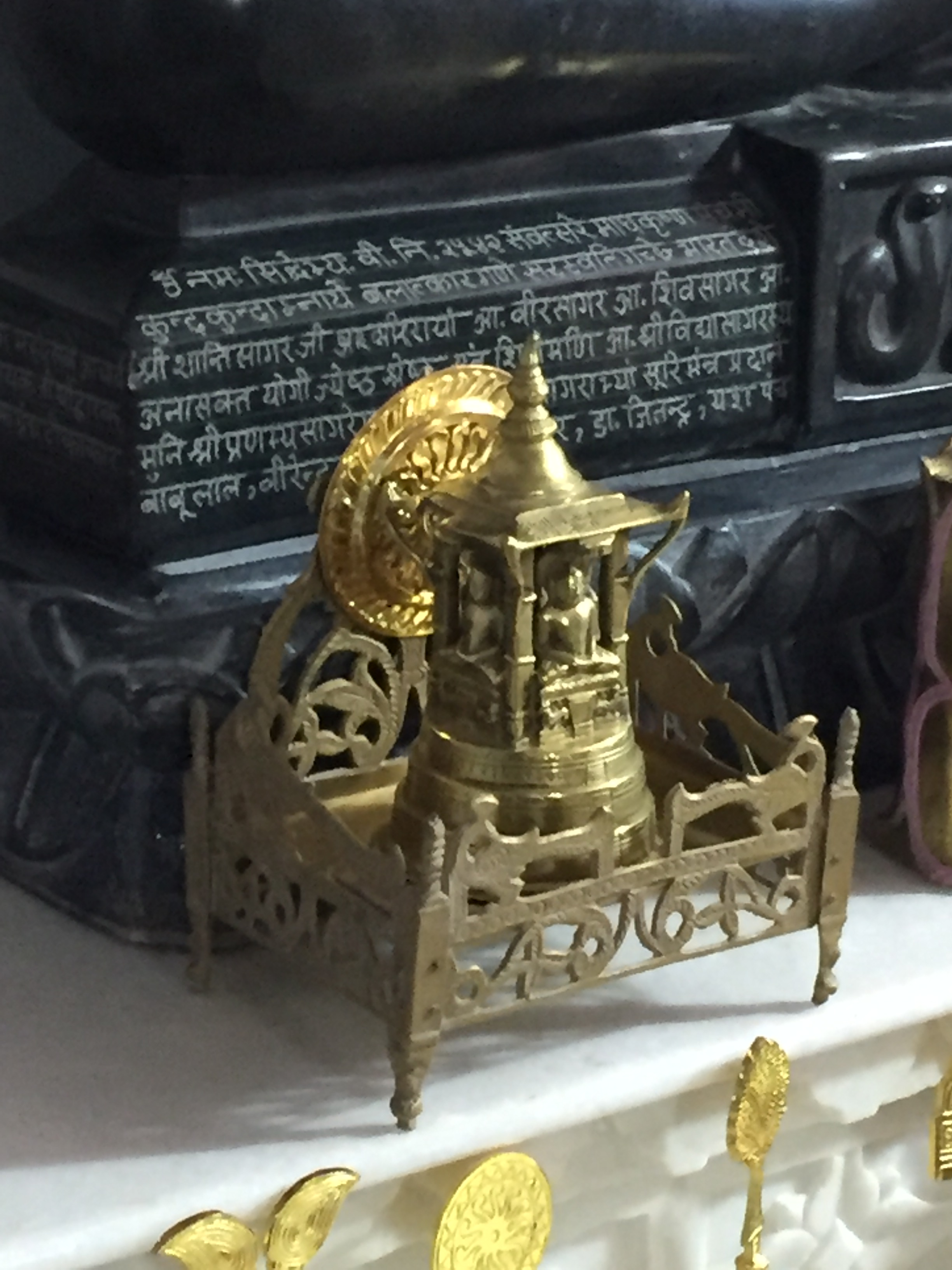
Inscription on a Parshvanath idol at Orchha mentioning the lineage of Acharya Vidyasagar from Acharya Shantisagar. He is termed anasakta yogi, jyeshtha, shreshtha, sant shiromani

He was also privately visited by American ambassador Kenneth Juster in 2018 and by French diplomat Alexandre Ziegler.

The fiftieth anniversary of his diksha was celebrated in many cities in India with parades and festivities in July 2018. On this occasion, commemorative columns (Swarna Kirti Stambha) were erected in Ajmer, Rewa, Sravanbelgola and other locations.

== In popular culture ==
A documentary titled Vidyoday, directed by Vidhi Kasliwal, was released on 25 November 2018 by Landmark Films. The film had its first international screening at the Harrow Safari Cinema in London.

== See also ==
- Jain philosophy
- List of Jains
- Ahimsa in Jainism
