= Dravyasamgraha =

Jain text by Nemichandra

- द्रव्यसंग्रह
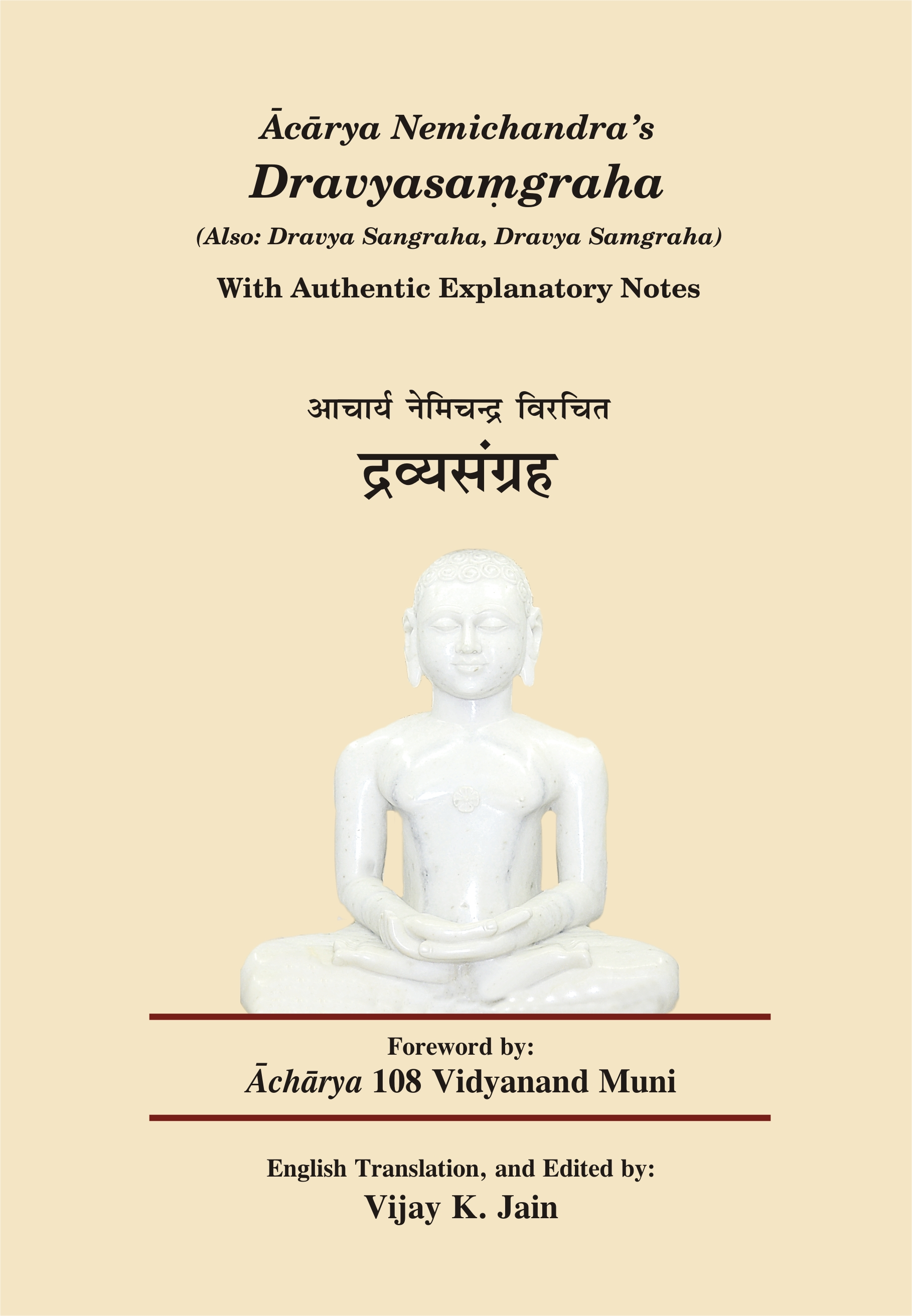
- Cover page of one of the English translation of Dravyasaṃgraha

Information
- Religion: Jainism
- Author: Nemicandra
- Language: Prakrit
- Period: 10th Century

Dravyasaṃgraha (Devnagari: द्रव्यसंग्रह) (Compendium of substances) is a 10th-century Jain text in Jain Sauraseni Prakrit by Acharya Nemicandra belonging to the Digambara Jain tradition. It is a composition of 58 gathas (verses) giving an exposition of the six dravyas (substances) that characterize the Jain view of the world: sentient (jīva), non-sentient (pudgala), principle of motion (dharma), principle of rest (adharma), space (ākāśa) and time (kāla). It is one of the most important Jain works and has gained widespread popularity. Dravyasaṃgraha has played an important role in Jain education and is often memorized because of its comprehensiveness as well as brevity.

== Author ==
10th century Jain Acarya, Nemicandra Siddhānta Cakravartin is regarded as the author of Dravyasaṃgraha. He was the teacher of Camundaraya—the general of the Western Ganga Dynasty of Karnataka. Nemicandra was a prolific author and a specialist in summarizing and giving lucidly the essence of teachings in various fields; saṃgrahas (compendium) and sāras (essence) were his specialty. He also wrote Trilokasāra (essence of cosmology), Labdhisāra (essence of attainments), Kṣapaṇasāra (essence on destruction of karmas), and Gommaṭasāra (essence of Gommata, a treatise on soul and Karma). Although not much is known about him from his own works, at the end of the Trilokasāra and of the Gommaṭasāra, he introduces himself as a pupil of Abhayanandi, Vīranandi, Indranandi and Kanakanandi. He is said to have inspired Camundaraya to build the famous Bāhubali statue at Shravanabelagola. Vahuvali Charitra (a Jain work based on collection of traditions) notes that Nemicandra belonged to the monastic order of Desiya gana. After establishing the statue of Bāhubali, Camundaraya offered villages yielding a revenue of 96,000 gold coins to Nemicandra for daily worship of and festivals for Gommatesvara (Lord Bāhubali).

== Influence ==
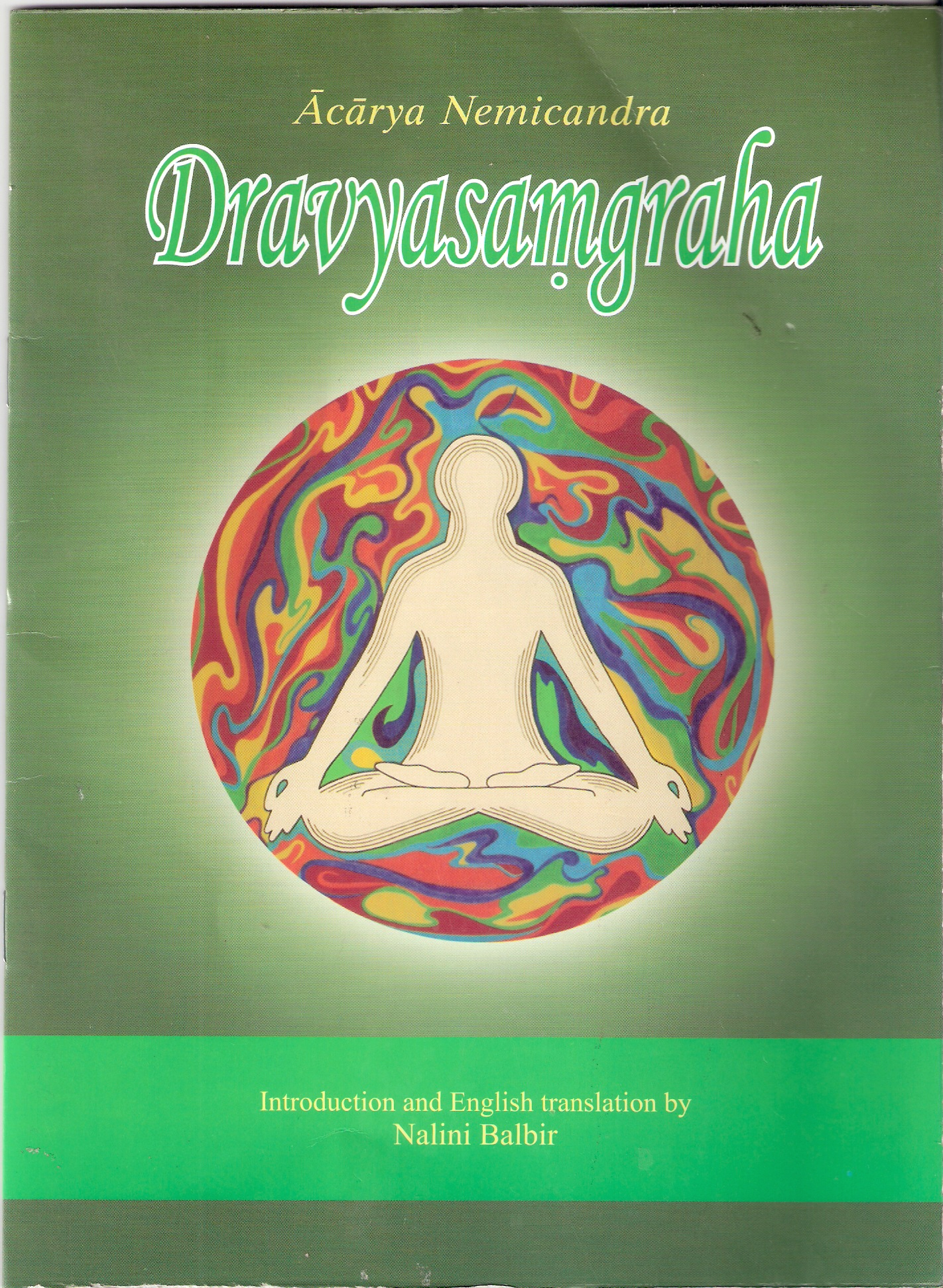
English translation by Nalini Balbir

Dravyasaṃgraha has played an important role in Jain education and is often memorized because of its comprehensiveness and brevity. The composition of Dravyasaṃgraha is influenced from the earlier Jain works such as Umāsvāti's Tattvārthasūtra and Kundakunda's Pañcāstikāyasara because these works are based on the same topics as the Dravyasaṃgraha.

== Contents and overview ==
According to Nalini Balbir, the Dravyasaṃgraha is largely a work of definitions of concepts with mnemonic perspective. In its 58 verses, the author makes skillful use of āryā metre. Nemicandra's presentation is often articulated around the opposition between the conventional and the absolute points of view (vyavahāra and niścaya-naya), or around the contrast between the material and the spiritual angles (dravya and bhāva). Sarat Chandra Ghoshal, the translator of Dravyasaṃgraha, divides the entire text in three convenient parts—the first part deals with six dravyas (verses 1–27), the second with seven tattvas (verses 28–39) and the third part describes the way to attain liberation (verses 40–57).

=== The six dravyas ===
In tine opening verse, along with the usual mangalacharana (eulogy), it is mentioned that dravya consists of jiva and ajiva. In the second verse Jiva is defined:

The sentient substance (soul) is characterized by the function of understanding, is incorporeal, performs actions (doer), is co-extensive with its own body. It is the enjoyer (of its actions), located in the world of rebirth (samsara) (or) emancipated (moksa) (and) has the intrinsic movement upwards.

— Dravyasamgraha—2

The various characteristics of Jiva mentioned in the definition are taken up one by one in verses 3–14. Dravyasaṃgraha classifies the embodied souls on the basis of the number of senses possessed by it: from one to five senses. After this detailed description of Jivas the author proceeds to describe Ajivas—Pudgala, Dharma, adharma, Akasa and Kala, each of which is defined in verses 16–22. Among these, as per verse 23, the Jiva, pudgala, dharma, adharma, and akasa are called astikayas, the extensibles or conglomerates.

=== Tattvas ===
The second part deals with the seven tattvas (fundamental principles or verities): jīva (soul), ajīva (non soul), āsrava (karmic inflow), bandha (bondage of karmas), saṃvara (stoppage of karmas), nirjarā (shedding of karmas) and mokṣa (emancipation or liberation). Together with puṇya (merit or beneficial karma) and pāpa (demerit or harmful karma) they form nine padārtha. Some call all nine as navatattava or nine tattvas.

=== Moksa ===
The third part of Dravyasaṃgraha begins with verse 39 describing the means to attain liberation from conventional and real point of views. The three jewels of Jainism also known as Ratnatraya—Samyak darśana (rational perception), samyak jñāna (rational knowledge) and samyak cāritra (rational conduct)—which are essential in achieving liberation—are defined and the importance of dhyāna (meditation) is emphasized. On meditation, Nemicandra says:

Do not be deluded, do not be attached, do not feel aversion for things which are (respectively) dear or not dear (to you), if you desire a steady mind for the attainment of extraordinary meditation.

— Dravyasamgraha—48

Do not act, do not talk, do not think at all, so that the soul is steady and is content in the self. This indeed is supreme meditation.

— Dravyasaṃgraha (56)

== Pañca-Parameṣṭhi ==
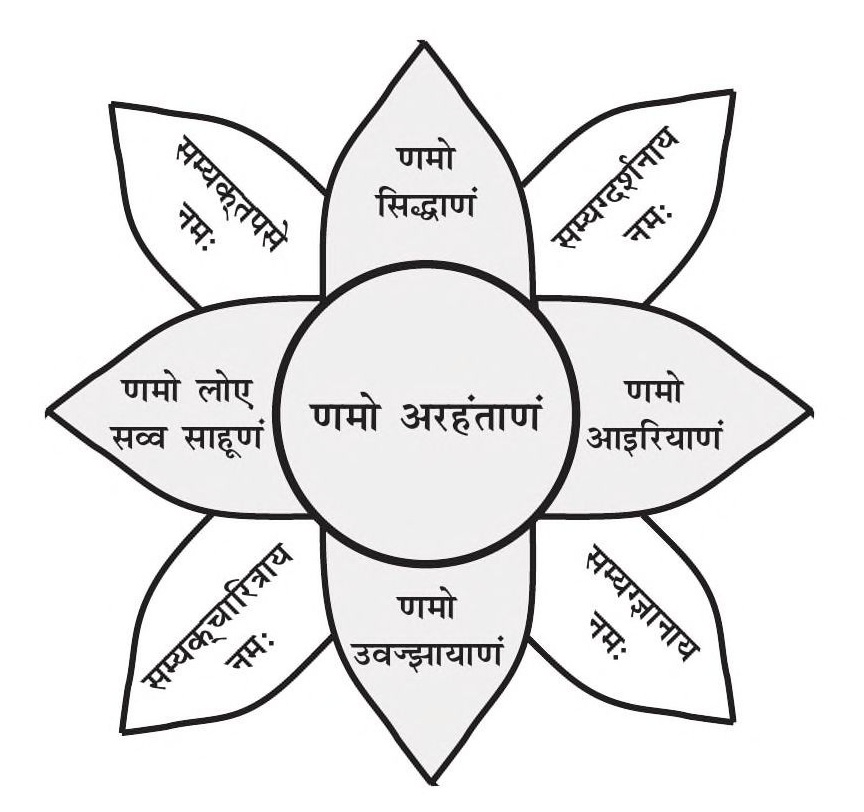
Obeisance to Pañca-Parameṣṭhi (five supreme beings)

Verses 49 to 54 of the Dravyasaṃgraha, succinctly characterizes the five Supreme Beings (Pañca-Parameṣṭhi) and their characteristics.

Having destroyed the four inimical varieties of karmas (ghātiyā karmas), possessed of infinite faith, happiness, knowledge and power, and housed in most auspicious body (paramaudārika śarīra), that pure soul of the World Teacher (Arhat) should be meditated on.

— Dravyasaṃgraha (50)

== Commentaries ==
One of the most popular commentaries of Dravyasaṃgraha is that by Brahmadeva from around the 14th century. Other commentaries on the work include:

- Balacandra (1142) – Tika on Nemicandra's Dravyasamgraha
- Mallisena (1292) – Commentary on Nemicandra Siddhantin's Dravyasamgraha
- Brahmadeva (1300) – Vrtti on Nemicandra's Dravyasamgraha
- Hamsaraja (1750) – Commentary on Nemicandra's Dravyasamgraha.
- Ramacandra – Commentary on Nemicandra's Dravyasamgraha.

== See also ==
- Jain Agamas
- Jainism
- List of Jain texts
