= Twelve Contemplations =

Concept in Jainism

In Jain tradition, twelve contemplations, (Prakrit: बारस अणुवेक्खा, bhavana) are the twelve mental reflections that a Jain ascetic and a practitioner should repeatedly engage in. These twelve contemplations are also known as Barah anuprekṣā or Barah bhāvana. According to Jain Philosophy, these twelve contemplations pertain to eternal truths like nature of universe, human existence, and karma on which one must meditate. Twelve contemplations is an important topic that has been developed at all epochs of Jain literature. They are regarded as summarising fundamental teachings of the doctrine. Stoppage of new Karma is called Samvara. Constant engagement on these twelve contemplations help the soul in samvara or stoppage of karmas.

== Twelve Contemplations ==
Following are twelve anuprekṣās or bhavanas that one must constantly reflect or contemplate upon:

1. Anitya – Impermanence (of everything), that is, contemplation on the fact that everything in this world including relations are transient and fleeting.
2. Asharana – Helplessness (against our karma). The soul is helpless against its own karma.
3. Ekatva – Solitariness (of the soul), that is, acceptance of the fact that I am alone in the world and alone will suffer or enjoy the consequences of my Karma.
4. Anyatva Distinctiveness (of the self from everything else). The knowledge that the world, my kinsmen, my body, my mind, all are distinct from my real self i.e. the soul.
5. Samsara – (inevitability of) transmigration, reflection of the fact that soul is ensnared in the continuous and sorrowful cycle of birth and death and cannot attain true happiness till it ends this cycle.
6. Loka – (the nature of) Universe, that is, contemplation on the fundamental truths about the universe that it is beginningless, uncreated and operates according to its own laws—there is no divine omnipotent being responsible for the Universe.
7. Ashucitva – Impurity (of soul, on account of its association with karma)
8. Asrava – Influx of karma. Reflection of the fact that inflow of karmas is the cause of my mundane existence and there is no liberation as long as my soul is associated with karmas.
9. Samvara – Cessation of karmic inflow, that is, contemplation on the stoppage of karmic inflow by cultivating necessary virtues.
10. Nirjara – Shedding of karma, that is, shedding or destruction of karmas by penances.
11. Dharmasvakhyata – path of righteousness, Reflection on the true nature of the path to righteousness based on true teachings of Jina through various practices like Ahimsa and non-attachment.
12. Bodhidurlabha – Rarity of finding the right path to enlightenment. Reflection on the fact that true enlightenment is very rare and many souls are deprived of moksha or liberation due to failure to reincarnate as human and attain true teachings of the Jina.

== Importance of Twelve Contemplations ==
Twelve Contemplations or anupreksa is an important tool for meditation. In Yogasastra, Hemcandra gives great importance to the twelve contemplations since constant reflections on these bhavanas results in detachment in worldly matters which in turn results in equanimity. With equanimity, passions (kasaya) are eliminated resulting in mental purity. This finally culminates into knowledge of self. Furthermore, these twelve contemplations are also one of the reasons for stoppage of influx of karmas as they regulate our thoughts and physical actions.

== Important texts detailing twelve contemplations ==
- Barasa Anuvekkha, a 2nd Century CE text by Acarya Kundakunda. It is a short Prakrit text of 90 gathas focusing on the spiritual aspects of meditation. Kundakunda shows how leading the mind in a certain direction will held develop detachment from worldly entanglements, thus helping the soul progress on the path of liberation. Muni Pranamyasagar has written the first and only commentary on it. It has been written in Kādambini style in Sanskrit language.
- Tattvarthasutra, a 2nd Century CE text by Umasvati.
- Yogasastra, a 12th Century CE text by Acarya Hemacandra. Hemacandra devotes a chapter on these contemplations in his Sanskrit text, Yogasastra.
- Maranavibhatti or Maranasamahi Painnayam – (gathas 570 – 640)

== See also ==
- Karma in Jainism
- Jainism and non-creationism
- Jain Philosophy
