= Righteousness =

State of being morally correct and justifiable

Righteousness is the quality or state of being morally right or justifiable according to the standards of God. The concept of righteousness is often compared with morality where morality defined as state of being acceptable and justifiable according to the predefined standards of people with purpose of co-existing in peace and unity, unlike righteousness which is being justifiable according to divine laws or ultimate source of truth. The concept is rooted in religious or divine law and broadly encompasses moral correctness, justice, and virtuous living as dictated by a higher authority or set of spiritual beliefs. It is found in many religions and traditions, including Buddhism, Christianity, Confucianism, Hinduism, Islam, Jainism, Judaism, Taoism, and Zoroastrianism. It is an attribute that implies that a person's actions are justified and can have the connotation that the person has been "judged" as living a moral life, relative to religious doctrines. Rectitude, often a synonym for righteousness, is about personal moral values and the internal compass that guides an individual’s decisions and actions.

== Etymology ==
Etymologically, it comes from Old English rihtwis, from riht 'right' + wīs 'manner, state, condition' (as opposed to wikt:wrangwīs, "wrongful").

William Tyndale (translator of the Bible into Early Modern English in 1526) created the modern spelling of righteousness after rihtwis, which would have yielded modern English right wise or right ways. He used it to translate the Hebrew root צדק tzedek, which appears over five hundred times in the Hebrew Bible, and the Greek word δίκαιος (dikaios), which appears approximately 80 times in the New Testament. This change in the ending of the word in the 16th century was due to association with words such as bounteous.

== Ethics or moral philosophy ==
Ethics is a major branch of philosophy that investigates questions about morality. The field is divided into two parts: normative ethics, which seeks to answer what is right or wrong, and metaethics, which seeks to explain the meaning and nature of moral judgements.

The word ethics is "commonly used interchangeably with 'morality' and sometimes it is used more narrowly to mean the moral principles of a particular tradition, group, or individual".

As such, the field of ethics is closely related to the concept of righteousness. In the case of normative ethics, it tries to provide an account of what things or acts are and are not righteous. In the case of metaethics, it tries to explain what it is for something to be righteous.

== Righteousness in religion ==
=== Abrahamic and Abrahamic-inspired religions ===
==== Christianity ====
In the New Testament, the word righteousness, a translation of the Greek word dikaiosunē, is used in the sense of 'being righteous before others' (e.g. Matthew 5:20) or 'being righteous before God' (e.g. Romans 1:17). William Lane Craig argues that we should think of God as the "paradigm, the locus, the source of all moral value and standards".

In Matthew's account of the Baptism of Jesus, Jesus tells John the Baptist, "It is fitting for us to fulfill all righteousness," as Jesus requests that John perform the rite for him. The Sermon on the Mount contains the commandment, "Seek ye first the kingdom of God and His righteousness".

A secondary meaning of the Greek word is 'justice', which is used to render it in a few places by a few Bible translations, e.g. in Matthew 6:33 in the New English Bible.

Jesus asserts the importance of righteousness by saying in Matthew 5:20, "For I tell you that unless your righteousness surpasses that of the Pharisees and the teachers of the law, you will certainly not enter the kingdom of heaven".

Paul the Apostle speaks of two ways to achieve righteousness: through the Law of Moses (or Torah) and through faith in the atonement made possible through the death and resurrection of Jesus Christ (Romans 10:3–13). However, he repeatedly emphasizes that faith is the more effective way. For example, a few verses earlier, he states that the Jews did not attain the law of righteousness because they sought it not by faith, but by works.

The New Testament speaks of a salvation founded on God's righteousness, as exemplified throughout the history of salvation narrated in the Old Testament (Romans 9–11). Paul writes to the Romans that righteousness comes by faith: "... a righteousness that is by faith from first to last, just as it is written: 'The righteous will live by faith'" (Romans 1:17).

James 2:14–26 speaks of the relationship between works of righteousness and faith, saying that "faith without works is dead". Righteous acts, according to James, include works of charity (James 2:15–16) as well as avoiding sins against the Law of Moses (James 2:11–12).

2 Peter 2:7–8 describes Lot as a righteous man.

Broadly, righteousness is defined as the state of being morally upright and in right standing with God according to divine standards. Rooted in the Hebrew concept of tsedeq and the Greek dikaiosynē, it signifies both the holy character of God and the ethical behavior expected of humanity within a conventional relationship. While the Old Testament emphasizes righteousness through adherence to the Mosaic Law, New Testament theology—particularly in the Pauline epistles—posits that human sinfulness makes perfect righteousness unattainable through personal effort alone. Consequently, mainstream Christian doctrine teaches that righteousness is a gift of grace received through faith in Jesus Christ. This is often distinguished between "imputed righteousness", where Christ’s merit is legally credited to the believer to achieve justification, and "imparted" or "infused" righteousness, where the Holy Spirit works within the individual to effect actual moral transformation during the process of sanctification.

==== Islam ====
Righteousness is mentioned several times in the Quran. The Quran says that a life of righteousness is the only way to go to Heaven.

We will give the home of the Hereafter to those who do not want arrogance or mischief on earth; and the end is best for the righteous.

— Quran 28:83

O mankind! We created you from a single (pair) of a male and a female and made you into nations and tribes that ye may know each other (not that ye may despise each other). Verily the most honored of you in the sight of Allah is (he who is) the most righteous of you. And Allah has full knowledge and is well acquainted (with all things).

— Quran 49:13

Righteousness is not that you turn your faces to the east and the west [in prayer]. But righteous is the one who believes in God, the Last Day, the Angels, the Scripture and the Prophets; who gives his wealth in spite of love for it to kinsfolk, orphans, the poor, the wayfarer, to those who ask and to set slaves free. And (righteous are) those who pray, pay alms, honor their agreements, and are patient in (times of) poverty, ailment and during conflict. Such are the people of truth. And they are the God-Fearing.

— Quran 2:177

==== Judaism ====
Righteousness is one of the chief attributes of God as portrayed in the Hebrew Bible. Its chief meaning concerns ethical conduct (for example, Leviticus 19:36; Deuteronomy 25:1; Psalms 1:6; Proverbs 8:20).

In the Book of Job, the title character is introduced as "a good and righteous man".

The Book of Wisdom calls on rulers of the world to embrace righteousness. It also concerns actively pursuing justice (Mishpat), and charity (Tzedakah).

The Talmud mentions that there are in each generation thirty-six righteous people (called Lamed Vav Tzadikim in Hebrew), whose existence sustains the world. This legend is mentioned by the Jewish historian and philosopher Gershom Scholem as "widespread in Jewish folklore".

After the second World War genocide of 6 million Jews, the Yad Vashem Holocaust Memorial Museum was tasked to identify and recognize the "Righteous Among the Nations". They are non-Jews who took high risks to save Jews from extermination. The honorary title of "Righteous Among the Nations" is awarded since 1963 by a special commission in Israel, headed by a justice of the Supreme Court of Israel, after studying each case in depth and assessing if they fit the required criteria.

==== Mandaeism ====
An early self-appellation for Mandaeans is bhiri zidqa meaning 'elect of righteousness' or 'the chosen righteous', a term found in the Book of Enoch and Genesis Apocryphon II, 4. In addition to righteousness, zidqa also refers to alms or almsgiving.

=== East Asian religions ===
==== Yi (Confucianism) ====
Yi, (Chinese: 義; simplified Chinese: 义; traditional Chinese: 義; pinyin: yì; Jyutping: Ji6; Zhuyin Fuhao: ㄧˋ), literally "justice, or justness, righteousness or rightness, meaning", is an important concept in Confucianism. It involves a moral disposition for the good in life with the sustainable intuition, purpose, and sensibility to do good competently without expectation of reward.

Yi resonates with the orientation of Confucian philosophy towards the cultivation of reverence or benevolence (ren) and skillful practice (li).

Yi represents moral acumen that goes beyond simple rule-following. As it is based on empathy, it involves a balanced understanding of a situation, and it incorporates the "creative insights" and grounding necessary to apply virtues through deduction (Yin and Yang) and reason "with no loss of purpose and direction for the total good of fidelity. Yi represents this ideal of totality and decisive ability to apply a virtue appropriately in a situation."

In application, yi is a "complex principle" that includes:

1. skill in crafting actions which have moral fitness according to a given concrete situation
2. the wise recognition of such fitness
3. the intrinsic satisfaction that comes from that recognition.

=== Indian religions ===
Although it is difficult to find a single-word translation for dharma in English, it can be translated as an uprising righteousness of karma, religion, faith, duty, law and virtue. Connotations of dharma include rightness, good, natural, morality, righteousness, and virtue. In common parlance, dharma means 'right way of living' and 'path of rightness'. It encompasses ideas such as duty, rights, character, vocation, religion, customs and all behaviour considered appropriate, correct or "morally upright". It is explained as a law of righteousness and equated to satya (truth): "...when a man speaks the Truth, they say, 'He speaks the Dharma'; and if he speaks Dharma, they say, 'He speaks the Truth!' For both are one" Dharma has been a central concept in India for many ages and can be traced back to the Vedic Eras, as early as 1500–1000 BCE.

An ancient Tamil moral text, the Tirukkural, is solely based on aṟam, the Tamil term for dharma. The antonym of dharma is generally referred to as adharma.

The wheel in the centre of India's flag represents the Dharma Chakra.

The importance of dharma to Indian sentiments can be seen in the fact that the national flag of India includes the Ashoka Chakra, a depiction of the dharmachakra ( the "wheel of dharma"), as the central motif on its flag.

==== Hinduism ====
"Yada yada hi dharmasya glanir bhavati bharata
Abhyutthanam adharmasya tadatmanam srjamy aham"

— Bhagavad Gita Chapter 4: Text 7
Translation:

Whenever there is decay of righteousness, O Bharata,
And there is exaltation of unrighteousness, then I Myself come forth

In Hindu philosophy and religion, major emphasis is placed on individual practical morality. In the Sanskrit epics, this concern is omnipresent. This includes duties, rights, laws, conduct, virtues, and "right way of living". The Sanskrit epics contain themes and examples where right prevails over wrong and good over evil.

In an inscription attributed to the Indian Emperor Ashoka from the year 258 BCE, in Sanskrit, Aramaic, and Greek text, appears a Greek rendering for the Sanskrit word dharma: the word eusebeia.

The Ramayana is one of the two major Indian epics. It tells about life in ancient India and offers models in dharma. The hero, Rama, lived his whole life by the rules of dharma; this is why he is considered heroic. When Rama was a young boy, he was the perfect son. Later, he was an ideal husband to his faithful wife, Sita, and a responsible ruler of Ayodhya. Each episode of Ramayana presents life situations and ethical questions in symbolic terms. The situation is debated by the characters, and finally, right prevails over wrong and good over evil. For this reason, in Hindu Epics, the good, morally upright, law-abiding king is referred to as dharmaraja.

In Mahabharata, another major Indian epic, dharma is similarly central, and it is presented with symbolism and metaphors. Near the end of the epic, the god Yama, referred to as dharma in the text, is portrayed as taking the form of a dog to test the compassion of Yudhishthira, who is told he may not enter paradise with such an animal but who refuses to abandon his companion, for which decision he is then praised by dharma. The appeal of Mahabharata, like Ramayana, is in its presentation of a series of moral problems and life situations, to which there are usually three answers given. According to Daniel H. H. Ingalls Sr., one answer is of Bhima, which is the answer of brute force, an individual angle representing materialism, egoism, and self; the second answer is of Yudhishthira, which is always an appeal to piety and gods, of social virtue and tradition; the third answer is of introspective Arjuna, which falls between the two extremes and who, claims Ingalls, symbolically reveals the finest moral qualities of man. There is extensive discussion of dharma at the individual level in the Epics of Hinduism, observes Ingalls; for example, on free will versus destiny, when and why human beings believe in either, ultimately concluding that the strong and prosperous naturally uphold free will, while those facing grief or frustration naturally lean towards destiny. The Epics of Hinduism illustrate various aspects of dharma, they are a means of communicating dharma with metaphors.

In Hinduism, dharma signifies behaviours that are considered to be in accord with Ṛta, the order that makes life and universe possible, and includes duties, rights, laws, conduct, virtues, and "right way of living". The concept of dharma was already in use in the historical Vedic religion, and its meaning and conceptual scope have evolved over several millennia.

==== Buddhism ====
In Buddhism, dharma means cosmic law and order but is also applied to the teachings of the Buddha. In Buddhist philosophy, dhamma/dharma is also the term for "phenomena". Dharma refers not only to the sayings of the Buddha, but also to the later traditions of interpretation and addition that the various schools of Buddhism have developed to help explain and to expand upon the Buddha's teachings.

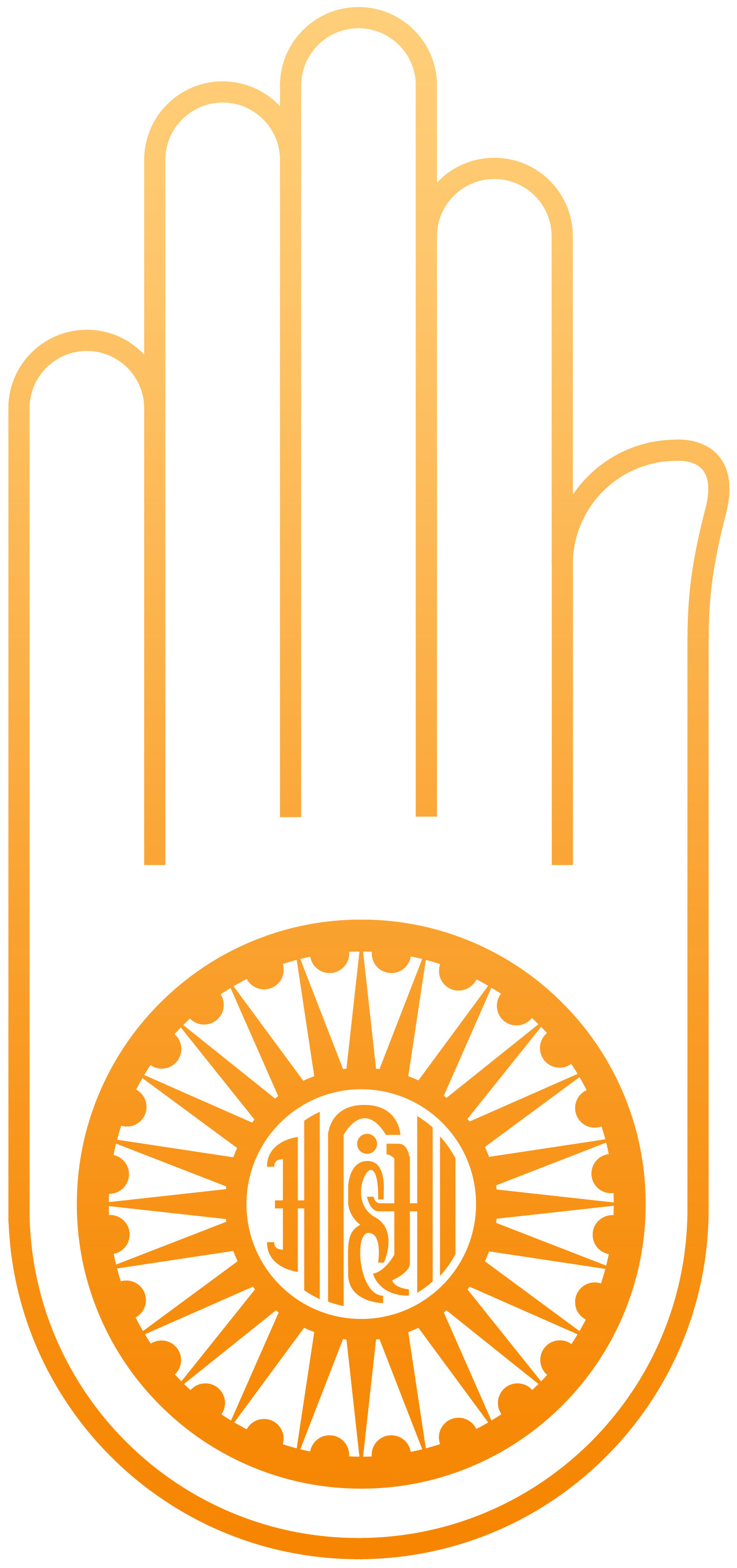
The Ahimsa Emblem (hand with wheel). Ahimsa is one of the ethical cores of Jain righteousness. It represents non-violence, Jain texts treat ahimsa as the foundation of righteous conduct.

==== Jainism ====
Tattvārthasūtra, a Jain philosophical text, mentions Das-dharma with the meaning of "righteous". These are forbearance, modesty, straightforwardness, purity, truthfulness, etc. Righteousness in Jainism is systematized through the doctrine of the Ratnatraya , which collectively constitute the path to liberation. These are right faith (samyak darśana), right knowledge (samyak jñāna), and right conduct (samyak cāritra). The Tattvārthasūtra states that liberation is attained through the combined practice of these three principles. Jain doctrine emphasizes that righteousness is incomplete if any one of these elements is absent, as ethical action without right knowledge or right faith is considered spiritually ineffective. Jainism does not personify righteousness; rather, through conduct, symbols and action.

A right believer should constantly meditate on virtues of dharma, like supreme modesty, in order to protect the soul from all contrary dispositions. He should also cover up the shortcomings of others.

— Puruṣārthasiddhyupāya (27)

In Jainism, righteousness is fundamentally associated with ethical discipline and spiritual purification aimed at liberating the soul (jīva) from karmic bondage. Jain philosophy holds that righteous living is essential to restrain the accumulation of karma and to eliminate existing karmic attachments, ultimately leading to moksha.

Samyak cāritra, or right conduct, represents the practical dimension of righteousness in Jainism. It involves disciplined control of body, speech, and mind, along with the systematic reduction of passions such as anger, pride, deceit, and greed. In Jainism, righteousness is inseparable from the goal of liberation. Ethical discipline purifies the soul by weakening karmic attachments and gradually restoring its inherent nature of infinite knowledge, perception, and bliss. Right conduct is regarded as essential for preventing karmic influx (āsrava) and facilitating the dissociation of accumulated karma (nirjarā).

==== Sikhism ====
For Sikhs, the word dharam (Punjabi: ਧਰਮ, dharam) means the path of righteousness and proper religious practice. Guru Granth Sahib in hymn 1353 connotes dharam as duty. The 3HO movement in Western culture, which has incorporated certain Sikh beliefs, defines Sikh dharam broadly as all that constitutes religion, moral duty, and way of life.

=== Persian religions ===
==== Zoroastrianism ====
In Zoroastrianism, asha is an important religious tenet with a complex and nuanced range of meaning. It is commonly summarized in accord with its contextual implications of 'truth' and 'right(eousness)', 'order' and 'right working'.

From an early age, Zoroastrians are taught to pursue righteousness by following the Threefold Path of asha: humata, huxta, huvarshta (Good Thoughts, Good Words and Good Deeds).

One of the most sacred mantras in the religion is the Ashem Vohu, which has been translated as an "Ode to Righteousness". There are many translations that differ due to the complexity of Avestan and the concepts involved (for other translations, see: Ashem Vohu).

"Righteousness is the best good and it is happiness. Happiness is to her/him who is righteous, for the sake of the best righteousness".

== See also ==
- Alien righteousness – Term coined by Martin Luther
- Asha – Central and complex Zoroastrian theological concept
- Chivalry – Traditional ideology and code of conduct of knights
- Christian perfection – Christian process of achieving spiritual perfection
- Hrī (Buddhism) – Buddhist term
- Human rights – Fundamental rights belonging to all humans
- Imparted righteousness – Concept in Methodist theology
- Imputed righteousness – Doctrine in Christianity; faithful humans are accepted by God
- Justice – Concept of moral fairness and administration of the law
- Justification (theology) – Concept of Christian theology
- Philotimo – Greek notion of duty and honor
- Piety – Religious devotion or spirituality
- Pono – Hawaiian word commonly rendered as "righteousness"
- Proper righteousness – Term coined by Martin Luther
- Righteous Among the Nations – Non-Jews who saved Jews during the Holocaust
- Righteous indignation – Emotion
- Sacred – Dedicated or set apart for the service or worship of a deity
- Sanctification – Dedicated or set apart for the service or worship of a deity
- Virtus – Masculine virtue in Ancient Rome
- Yi – Concept in Confucianism
- Tzadikim Nistarim – 36 hidden Righteousness
