= Ratnatraya =

Jainism teaching of right faith, right knowledge, right conduct

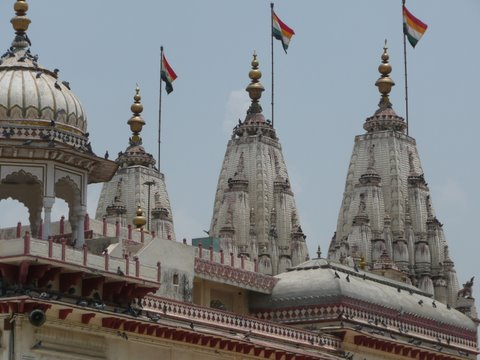
The three shikhar (top) of a Jain temple represents Ratnatraya (three jewels)

The ratnatraya are the three jewels of Jainism, namely samyak darshana (right faith or view), samyak gyana (right knowledge), and samyak charitra (right conduct), which constitute the path to liberation.

== The path to liberation ==
Right faith, right knowledge, and right conduct (together) constitute the path to liberation.

— Tattvārthasūtra (1-1)

For ascetics, the spiritual goal in Jainism is to reach moksha. But for most Jain laypersons, it is to accumulate good karma that leads to a better rebirth and brings them a step closer to liberation. Purification of the soul and liberation can be achieved through the three jewels (ratnatraya): samyak darśana, right vision or faith in the Jain teachings or scriptures, more specifically faith in the seven tattvas; (Note: According to Padmanabh S. Jaini, samyak darśana is acceptance of the truth of soul (jīva).) samyak gyana, right knowledge and understanding of the Jain teachings, more specifically of self (jiva) and non-self (ajiva); and samyak charitra, correct conduct, that is, behavior consistent with these teachings and the five vows. Jain texts often add samyak tapas (correct asceticism) as a fourth jewel, emphasizing ascetic practices as the means to liberation (moksha). The four jewels are called Moksha Marga (the path of liberation).

== Right faith (samyak darśana) ==
Acharya Umaswami states in Tattvārthasūtra (1-2) that "Belief in substances [tattvas] ascertained as they are is right faith." According to the Digambara, there are seven tattva:

1. jīva — the soul which is characterized by consciousness.
2. ajīva — the non-soul
3. āsrava — inflow of auspicious and evil karmic matter into the soul.
4. bondage (Bandha) — mutual intermingling of the soul and karmas
5. Samvara (stoppage) — obstruction of the inflow of karmic matter into the soul.
6. Nirjara — gradual dissociation of karmic matter from the soul
7. Moksha (liberation) — complete annihilation of all karmic matter (bound with any particular soul)

Prior to attaining right view (samyak darsana), an individual exists in a state of external self (bahiratman). In this state, self-identity is falsely attached to external factors, like the physical body, material possessions, and temporal life circumstances. This focus on external prevents self-transformation and perpetuates the cycle of transmigration(samsara). The attainment of samyak darshan redirects a person's attention away from external concerns and towards the essential nature of the soul.

== Right knowledge (Samyak gyana) ==
On attaining right faith a person realizes its true nature, the soul (svabhava). This shift transforms the consciousness into knowing self-awareness (jnana cetana). In this state, the practitioner stops identifying the self with the physical body, material goods, or changing emotional states such as anger, pride etc. The soul realizes its true nature as a knowing reality and dwells in this state called antaratman.

Right knowledge yields cognitive and spiritual benefits for the practitioner. Cognition of external objects no longer produces an impulse to grasp, possess, or manipulate them. This detachment enhances personal mindfulness and establishes pure awareness.

== Right conduct (Samyak charitra) ==
Right conduct is the application of the knowledge developed, so as to exercise control over our inner desires and reach a stage where there is no attachment or aversion.

Right conduct includes:

- Five kinds of spiritual purity
1. Sāmāyika (equanimity),
2. penalties for faults arising from inadvertence, or negligence, on account of which one loses equanimity,
3. refraining from himsa (injury),
4. control of passions, and
5. contemplation of one's own soul
- Observance of Mahavratas (five major vows):
1. Ahiṃsā, not to hurt any living being by actions and thoughts
2. Satya, not to lie or speak what is not commendable.
3. Asteya, not to take anything if not given.
4. Brahmacharya, chastity / Celibacy in action, words & thoughts
5. Aparigraha (Non-possession), detachment from material property.
- Seven supplementary vows:

Guņa vratas, merit vows
1. digvrata, restriction on movement with regard to directions.
2. bhogopabhogaparimana, vow of limiting consumable and non-consumable things
3. anartha-dandaviramana, refraining from harmful occupations and activities (purposeless sins).
Śikşā vratas, disciplinary vows
4. samayika, vow to meditate and concentrate periodically.
5. desavrata, limiting movement to certain places for a fixed period of time.
6. upvas, fasting at regular intervals.
7. atihti samvibhag, vow of offering food to the ascetic and needy people

Through sustained practice of pure conduct, the soul eventually achieves complete purity and self-realisation as the liberated self.

== See also ==
- Three Jewels of Buddhism

== Sources ==
- Bailey, William (2012), The Theological Universe, Bailey Publishing, PA, ISBN 978-1-312-23861-9
- Cort, John E. (2001a), Jains in the World : Religious Values and Ideology in India, Oxford University Press, ISBN 978-0-19-513234-2
- Fohr, Sherry (2015), Jainism: A Guide for the Perplexed, Bloomsbury Publishing, ISBN 978-1-4742-2756-8
- Grimes, John (1996), A Concise Dictionary of Indian Philosophy: Sanskrit Terms Defined in English, New York: SUNY Press, ISBN 0-7914-3068-5
- Champat Rai Jain (1917), The Practical Path, The Central Jaina Publishing House
- Jain, S. A. (1992) [1960], Reality (English Translation of Srimat Pujyapadacharya's Sarvarthasiddhi) (Second ed.), Jwalamalini Trust, " This article incorporates text from this source, which is in the public domain."
- Jain, Vijay K. (2011), Acharya Umasvami's Tattvarthsūtra (1st ed.), Uttarakhand: Vikalp Printers, ISBN 978-81-903639-2-1, " This article incorporates text from this source, which is in the public domain."
- Jain, Vijay K. (2012), Acharya Amritchandra's Purushartha Siddhyupaya: Realization of the Pure Self, With Hindi and English Translation, Vikalp Printers, ISBN 978-81-903639-4-5, " This article incorporates text from this source, which is in the public domain."
- Jaini, Padmanabh S. (1998) [1979], The Jaina Path of Purification, Delhi: Motilal Banarsidass, ISBN 978-81-208-1578-0
- Long, Jeffery D. (2013), Jainism: An Introduction, I.B. Tauris, ISBN 978-0-85771-392-6
- Sangave, Vilas Adinath (1980), Jain Community: A Social Survey (2nd ed.), Bombay: Popular Prakashan, ISBN 978-0-317-12346-3
