= Samskara (Indian philosophy) =

Sanskrit term for mental impressions

In Hindu Philosophy and some Indian religions, samskaras or sanskaras (Sanskrit: संस्कार) are mental impressions, recollections, or psychological imprints that colour one's thoughts and actions, and form the basis for the development of karma theory.

In Buddhism, the Sanskrit term saṃskāra is used to describe "mental formations," "will," and many other concepts; in Pāli it is referred to as saṅkhāra.

According to various schools of Indian philosophy, every action, intent or preparation by an individual leaves a samskara (impression, impact, imprint) in the deeper structure of the person's mind. These impressions then await volitional fruition in that individual's future, in the form of hidden expectations, circumstances or a subconscious sense of self-worth. These Samskaras manifest as tendencies, karmic impulses, subliminal impressions, habitual potencies or innate dispositions. In ancient Indian texts, the theory of Samskara explains how and why human beings remember things, and the effect that memories have on people's suffering, happiness and contentment.

== Etymology and meaning ==
The Sanskrit word saṃskāra (संस्कार) has various context-driven meanings that broadly refer to "the putting together, accomplishing well, making perfect, a form of solemn recognition and getting ready" and "mental impression, recollection".

The first use of the term, which relies primarily on its first definition, refers to Hindu rites of passage.

The second definition presents saṃskāra as a form of disposition, impression, or behavioral inclination. In this sense, it is used as a psychological concept in some Indian philosophies, such as Yoga. The concept of saṃskāra is also discussed as Vasana (Sanskrit: वासना vāsanā), particularly in the Vaiśeṣika school of Hinduism. Vasana also means "impression, inclination of anything remaining unconsciously in the mind".

== Context ==
Samskara, or Sankhara, is a significant concept across major schools of Hindu philosophy as well as Buddhism and Jainism. The schools of Indian philosophy differ on the specific mechanisms about how samskara operates at the subconscious level. For example, Buddhism considers samskara as "causal continua" while being consistent with its "there is no self, no soul" premise, whereas the Vedic traditions within Hinduism consider samskara as "relational properties" (an impression, mark, impulse, tendency or a form of psychological potential energy within) that rests inside the "self, soul" of every person. In Yoga, Vedanta and Nyaya schools of Hinduism, samskara constitute an affective and motivational field that contributes to the value structure within the person. They subconsciously or consciously endorse the basic inner drives that propel a human being in future action, future premises, future thoughts or future judgments.

Das states that the Samskara rites of passage is a subset of actions in a human being's life, where going through the rite within the traditions of Hinduism, affects the individual internally as well as externally in how society perceives the person. This occurs in the form of impressions and imprint within, that is samskara.

== Hinduism ==
The Hindu schools differ in the details, but all posit that samskara are formed in every individual by a number of ways. This includes perceptions (what one sees, hears, touches, tastes, smells), chitta cognition (what one feels and thinks), willful actions, and also intentions before and during the action. Training and study, in these schools, is a form of exposition, introspective realization and in many cases practice or repetition to make the "impression, imprint" part of one's nature, where the practice reinforces the dispositions (samskara) and dispositions reinforce the practice, in a circular feedback. Scholars state that David Hume's "impressions" theory is similar to Samskara theory of Hinduism. The Hindu schools rely on samskara theory as one of the pillars for their epistemology (pramana), wherein they explain how and why man knows anything, remembers anything, expects anything, feels fulfillment, feels frustration, feels freedom and joy, or feels suffering and pain. In Hindu philosophy, Samskara are the impressions and dispositions that develop and accumulate deep inside a person from perception, inference, choices, preparation, practice, interaction with others, thoughts, intent, willful actions and such karma. These manifest as habits, behavior, tendencies, psychological predispositions and dispositions.

Actions, studies, diligent preparation and inner resolutions trigger Samskaras – hidden impressions or dispositions – in the psyche of an individual, and these influence how the individual acts, perceives self and the manner in which the individual responds or accepts the karmic circumstances and the future. Ian Whicher explains that, in the philosophical theories of Hinduism, every karma (action, intent) leaves a samskara (impression, impact, imprint) in the deeper structure of human mind. This impression then awaits volitional fruition, in the form of hidden expectations, circumstances or unconscious sense of self-worth. It manifests as tendency, karmic impulse, subliminal impression, habitual potency or innate dispositions.

=== Samkhya-Yoga ===
In Samkhya and other Indian Yoga schools, Sankhara, also spelled as Samskara, are impressions or residues that affect an individual's Gunas (behavior attributes). These impressions constitute part of the mechanistic foundation behind ancient Indian scholars' explanation on how karma theory works in practice. Samskara are explained as dispositions, character or behavioral traits either as default from birth or Samskara are behavioral traits perfected over time through Yoga, through conscious shaping of inner self, one's desire, sense of moral responsibility and through practice.

In Yoga school of Hinduism, all actions and intents lead to impressions and memories, whether they are active or hidden, conscious or unconscious. A person may not remember his or her past karma, yet the impressions shape his character, the habits, the circumstances, the essence of that person because of the impressions left by the karma. These tendencies, subtle traces and innate characteristics, states the Yoga school, continue to affect the person's present actions, assumptions, attitudes (bhava), mind (buddhi), moral response and interactions with everyone, everything and self. Vyasa, Patanjali and other ancient Indian scholars refer to these as karmic residues (karmasaya). Personality, states Patanjali, is the sum total combination of all these impressions and subtle traces (samskaras). Individuals tend to do what they did in the past, man forms habit and often returns to those habits, and behaviors tend to repeat because of these samskaras, according to these Yoga scholars.

=== Vedanta ===
These are viewed as traces or temperament that evolves through the refinement of an individual inner consciousness and expressed personality, and is a form of "being-preparedness" in Vedantic psychology. All physical, verbal and mental activity, according to the Vedanta school of Hinduism, creates Samskara, or traces inside a person. These Samskaras together then manifest as inner personality and external circumstances, and depending then on individual's response thereof, these then bear phala (fruit). In the state where an individual realizes Self and reaches jivanmukti (moksha), Shankara, Mandana, Sarvajnatman and other Vedanta scholars suggest that the causes of impressions such as ignorance disappear, the individual reaches inner resolution and complete acceptance of self, thus becoming free of samskaras and consequent blissful state of existence.

=== Nyaya and Vaiśeṣika ===
In Nyaya school of Hinduism, Bhavana (Sanskrit: भावना) is synonymous with Samskara, a property that manifests as impressions or traces on the soul. It is a key concept in Nyaya philosophy, and it applies the idea to both living and non-living world. For example, the vega (velocity) of vayu (wind) is its samskara, in Nyaya literature. The concept is intimately related to Nyaya's search and reason-driven explanation of causes behind what happens in living and non-living world, and why. All voluntary actions, state Nyayayikas, have a cause, and these are guided by Samskara. For example, a newborn child voluntarily and instinctively acts to reach for the mother's breast. This action, explain Nyaya texts, must have a cause, but the newborn has neither been provided that knowledge nor has the value of the mother's breast been explained by another, nor has the newborn formed any Samskara in the new life. The newborn has that knowledge, that instinct, from some impression, some trace within "from a prior experience". That is an example of Samskara, assert the Nyaya and Vaiśeṣika scholars.

In Nyaya school of Hinduism, the existence of Samskara cannot be directly perceived, only inferred. Further, not all Samskara are psychological. Some simply manifest as memories, premises or beliefs shaped "from a prior experience".

== Buddhism ==
Saṃskāra or Saṅkhāra in Buddhism refers to mental "dispositions". These result from past volitions, and are causes of future volitions. Saṅkhāra also refers to that faculty within a person wherein these dispositions are formed. Buddhism emphasizes the need to purify dispositions (Saṅkhāra) rather than eliminate them.

== Jainism ==
The activities of mind, speech and body, according to Jain philosophy, lead to Asrava, that is, the influx and imprint of karmic residues to the jiva (soul) of the living being. These residues bind (bandha), forming karma sarira, which can be stopped (saṃvara) and released (nirjara). The operating mechanism, consistent with the dualism premise of Jainism, is not Saṃskāra as latent mental trace, rather karma bandha to the soul. The rituals and rites of passage, called Samskara in Jainism, are part of the saṃvara and nirjara initiation process, in order to free the soul from the crust of karmic residues.

== See also ==
- Saṅkhāra (Buddhist concept)
- Saṃskāra (Hindu rites of passage)
- Samskara (ayurvedic) (Ayurvedic medicinal process)
- Meher Baba on Sanskaras
- Engram (neuropsychology)
- Engram (Scientology)
