= Umaswati =

Author of the Jain text Tattvartha Sutra

Vācaka Varya Umaswati
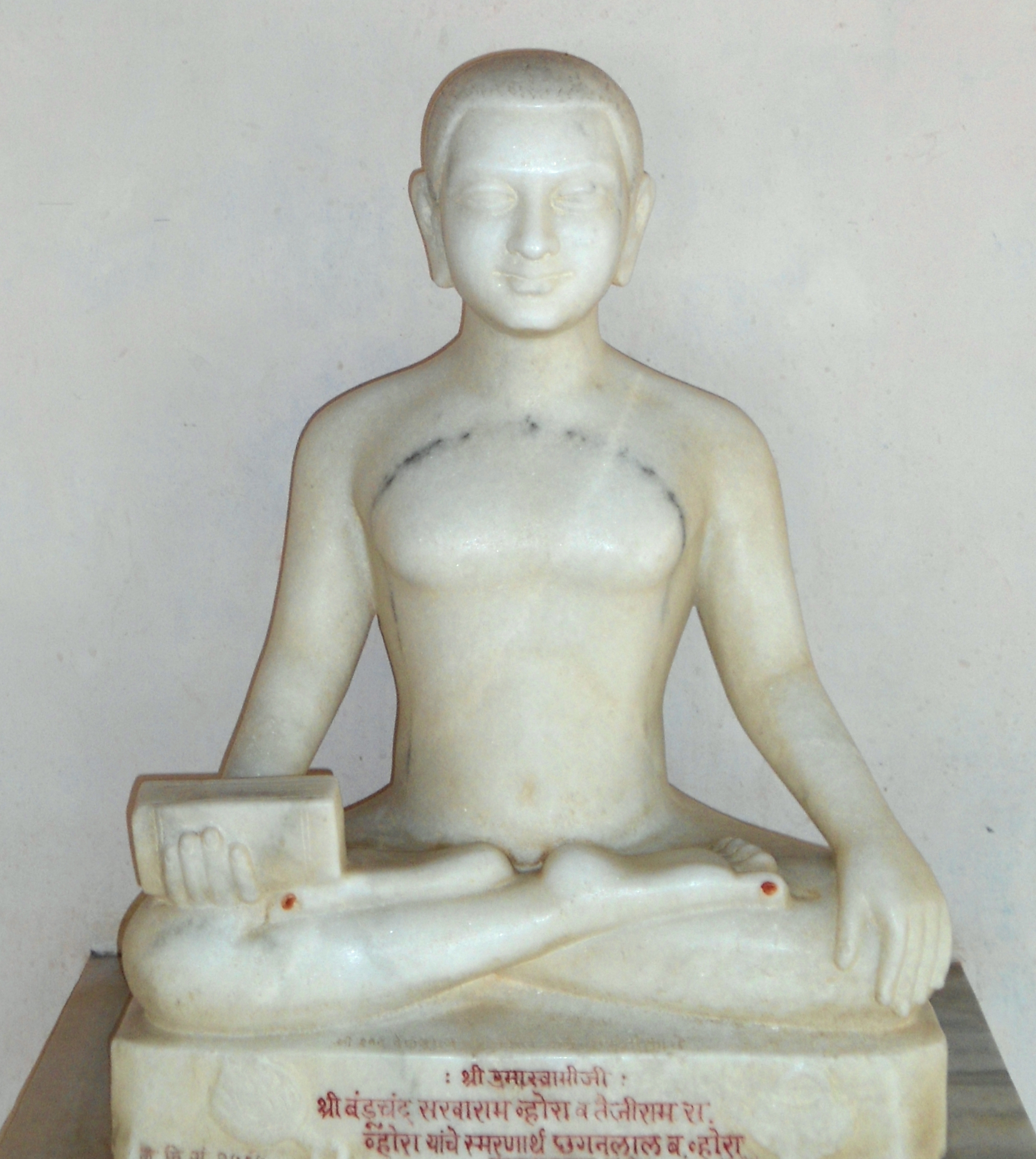
- Image of Umaswati

Personal life
- Born: 1st to 5th century Nyagrodhika
- Died: 2nd to 5th century
- Parents: Svāti (father); Umā (mother)
- Notable work(s): Tattvartha Sutra, Tattvarthabhāṣya
- Honours: Pūrvadhāri

Religious life
- Religion: Jainism
- Lineage: Uchchairnāgar Gaccha
- Sect: Śvetāmbara / Digambara

Religious career
- Teacher: Ghoṣanandi

Vācaka Umāsvāti, also spelled as Vācaka Umasvati and known as Vācaka Umāsvāmī, was an Indian scholar, possibly between the 2nd and 5th centuries CE, known for his foundational writings on Jainism. He authored the Jainatext Tattvartha Sutra (literally '"All That Is", also called Tattvarthadhigama Sutra). According to historian Moriz Winternitz, Umāsvāti may have been a Śvetāmbara ascetic as his views correspond more with the Śvetāmbara sect than with the Digambara sect, and that the latter is 'hardly entitled to claim him.' Umāsvāti's work was the first Sanskrit language text on Jaina philosophy, and is the earliest extant comprehensive Jaina philosophy text accepted as authoritative by all four Jaina traditions. His text has the same importance in Jainism as Vedanta Sutras and Yogasutras have in Hinduism.

Umāsvāti is claimed by both the Digambara and Śvētāmbara sects of Jainism as their own. However, several Jaina scholars consider him to be a Śvetāmbara ascetic. On the basis of his genealogy, he was also called Nagaravachka. Umāsvāti was influential not only in Jainism, but also other Indian traditions over the centuries. The 13th- to 14th-century Madhvacharya, founder of Dvaita Vedanta school of Hindu philosophy, for example referred to Umāsvāti in his works as Umasvati-Vācakācārya. Some in the Digambara Jaina tradition believe him to be the chief disciple of Acharya Kundakunda. However, this is disputed by several Indian as well as Western scholars. According to Ramesh Chandra Gupta, a Digambara scholar, Śvetāmbaras' version of Umāsvāti's biography is accepted over their Digambara counterparts.

Umāsvāti, was an Upadhyaya and therefore one of the Pañca-Parameṣṭhi (five supreme beings) in Jaina tradition. The theory mooted by Umāsvāti is that rebirth and suffering is on account of one's karma (deeds) and a life lived in accordance to vows of virtuous living with austerities cleanses this karma, ultimately leading to liberation. The main philosophy in Umāsvāti's Tattvārtha Sutra aphorisms is that "all life, both human and non-human, is sacred."

== Biography ==
Umāsvāti was born in Nyagrodhikā village. His father was Svāti and his mother was Umā. Umāsvāti was thus called as Svatitanaya after his father's name and as Vatsisuta after his mother's lineage. His name is a combination of the names of his parents. Umāsvāti is also known as Vācaka-śramana and Nagaravacaka. Digambaras call him Umasvamin. He is said to have had been initiated into the Uccairnāgara Gaccha of the Śvetāmbara sect by a monk named Ghoshanandi.

According to Vidyabhusana's book published in 1920, Umāsvāti died in 85 CE. More recent scholarship, such as by Padmanabh Jaini on the other hand, places him later, likely in the 2nd-century. Modern scholars such as Walter Slaje state that there are disagreements in dating Umāsvāti, and even whether Umāsvāti and Umāsvāmī were two different persons, who lived sometime between 2nd- to 5th-century CE. Paul Dundas agrees that Tattvartha Sutra is among the oldest surviving Jaina philosophy text along with Bhagavatī-Sūtra and the older Rsibhasitani, but dates Umāsvāti and the text to the 4th to 5th century.

Umāsvāti authored his scriptural work the Tattvartha Sutra when he was in Pataliputra or Kusumapura (now known as Patna, Bihar). He was the first Jaina thinker to have written a philosophical work in the sutra style.

In Digambara tradition that reveres Kundakunda, Umāsvāti is considered as a disciple of Kundakunda. However, they differ in two ways. One, Kundakunda wrote in Prakrit, while Umāsvāti used Sanskrit. Second, their doctrines differ in the details, such as those about anekantavada. Neither mentions the other in his writings, and scholars have debated if there was any link between the two, and who preceded the other.

== Philosophy ==
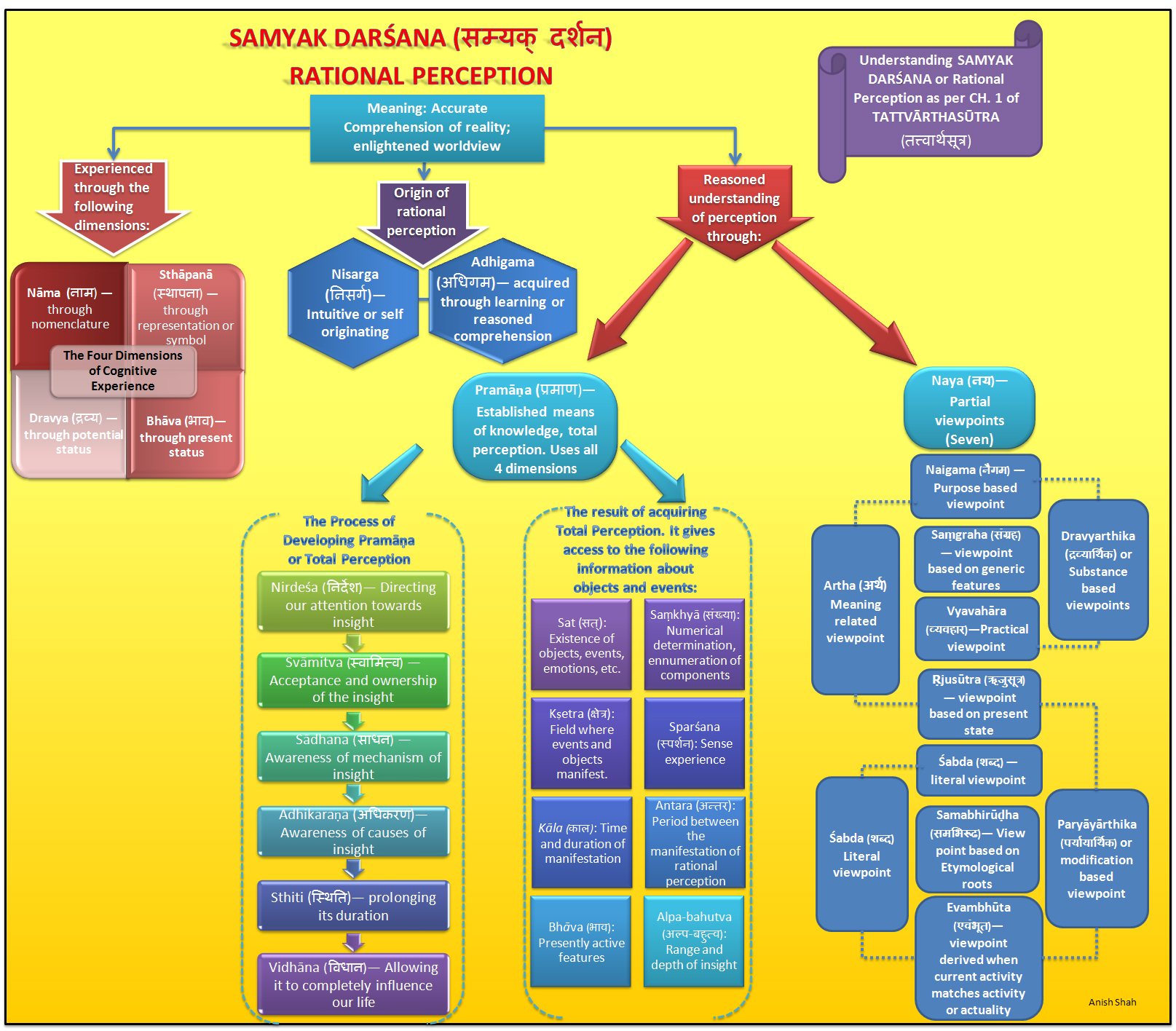
Chart showing Samyak Darsana as per Tattvarthasutra

Umāsvāti in his Tattvartha Sutra, an aphoristic sutra text in Sanskrit language, enunciates the complete Jaina philosophy. He includes the doctrines on the subjects of non-violence or ahimsa, Anekantavada (simultaneous existence and non-existence of something), and non-possession. The text, states Jaini, summarizes "religious, ethical and philosophical" themes of Jainism in the second century India. The Sūtras or verses have found ready acceptance with all the sects of Jainas, and on which bhasya (reviews and commentaries) have been written. Umāsvāti states that these beliefs are essential to achieving moksha or emancipation.

His sutra has been variously translated. The first verse of Tattvartha Sutra has been translated as follows:

"The enlightened darsana (world view), enlightened knowledge and enlightened conduct are the path to liberation" – Translated by Nathmal Tatia

"Right faith, right knowledge and right conduct constitute the path to liberation" – Translated by Vijay Jain

— Umaswati, Tattvartha Sutra 1.1

=== Seven categories of truth ===
The core theology of Umāsvāti in Tattvartha Sutra presents seven categories of truth in sutra 1.4:

1. Souls exist (Jīva)
2. Non-sentient matter exists (ajiva)
3. Karmic particles exist that inflow to each soul (asrava)
4. Karmic particles bind to the soul which transmigrate with rebirth (bandha)
5. Karmic particles inflow can be stopped (samvara)
6. Karmic particles can fall away from soul (nirjara)
7. Complete release of karmic particles leads to liberation from worldly bondage (moksha)

Umāsvāti categorizes the types of knowledge to be empirical, attained through one's sense of perception; articulation that which is acquired through literature; clairvoyance is perception of things outside the natural reach of senses; mind reading; and omniscience. In chapter 2, Umāsvāti presents sutras on soul. He asserts that soul is distinguished by suppression of deluding karma, or elimination of eight types of karmas, or partial presence of destructive karmas, or arising of eight types of new karmas, or those that are innate to the soul, or a combination of these. In chapter 3 through 6, Umāsvāti presents sutras for his first three categories of truth.

=== Ethics ===
In chapter 7, Umāsvāti presents the Jaina vows and explains their value in stopping karmic particle inflow to the soul. The vows, translates Nathmal Tatia, are ahimsa (abstinence from violence), anirta (abstinence from falsehood), asteya (abstinence from stealing), brahmacharya (abstinence from carnality), and aparigraha (abstinence from possessiveness).

=== Karma and rebirths ===
Umāsvāti, in chapter 8 of Tattvartha Sutra presents his sutras on how karma affects rebirths. He asserts that accumulated karma in life determine the length of life and realm of rebirth for each soul in each of four states – infernal beings, plants and animals, human beings and as gods. Further, states Umāsvāti, karma also affects the body, the shape, the characteristics as well as the status of the soul within the same species, such as Ucchi (upper) or Nicchi (lower) status. The accumulated and new karma are material particles, states Umāsvāti, which stick to the soul and these travel with the soul from one life to the next as bondage, where each ripens. Once ripened, the karmic particles fall off, states Umāsvāti.

=== Shedding karma and liberation ===
The chapter 9 of Tattvartha Sutra by Umāsvāti describe how karmic particles can be stopped from attaching to the soul and how these can be shed. He asserts that gupti (curbing activity), dharma (virtues such as forbearance, modesty, purity, truthfulness, self-restraint, austerity, renunciation), contemplation, endurance in hardship (he lists twenty two hardships including hunger, thirst, cold, heat, nakedness, injury, lack of gain, illness, praise, disrespect), and with good character towards others (he lists five – equanimity, reinitiation, non-injury (ahimsa), slight passion and fair conduct), a soul stops karmic accumulations. External austerities such as fasting, reduced diet and isolated habitation, while internal austerities such as expiation, reverence, service, renunciation and meditation, according to Umāsvāti, along with respectful service to teachers and ailing ascetics help shed karma.

The state of liberation is presented in Chapter 10 by Umāsvāti. It is achieved when deluding and obstructive karmas have been destroyed. This leads to the state of quietism and potentiality, and the soul then moves to the end of the universe, states Umāsvāti.

== Works ==
The Tattvartha Sutra has been the most important work of Umāsvāti. However, this text exists in at least two overlapping versions. The Svetambara version and the Digambara versions differ, for example, in sutras 1.33 and 1.34, with the Svetambara version listing five nayas and the Digambara version listing seven. However, the Śvetāmbara version is considered to be older as compared to its Digambara counterpart, owing to an earlier belief about the classification of animals based on senses. Tholkappiyam, an ancient non-Jaina Tamil text classifies animals the same way as the Śvetāmbara version of Tattvartha Sutra does. This observation is markedly different from the beliefs of the Digambara sect as well as the classification stated in Puranas and Upanishads. It also suggests that Umāsvāti may have been a Śvetāmbara ascetic and that the southern region of India was once also dominated by Śvetāmbaras.

Along with Tattvartha Sutra, he also wrote Prasamarati, a guide for the aspirant on the path of peace and liberation from karmic bondage. Other texts attributed to Umāsvāti, but lost over time are Jambūdvīpasamāsa, Śaucaprakaraṇa, Śrāvakaprajñapti, Dānaprakaraṇa, and Dharmaprakaraṇa among several Śvetāmbara texts authored by him. The Praśamarati is thought to have been written after the Tattvartha Sutra. It contains 313 stanzas in the meter of arya and has 22 chapters. The position of anekāntavāda is not explicitly mentioned in this text. The Praśamarati includes nine categories (tattva), as opposed to the seven recognized in the Tattvartha Sutra.

== Reception ==
Umāsvāti was an influential, authoritative scholar in Indian history, particularly within Jainism. His Tattvartha Sutra has been a key and the oldest surviving text in Jainism, was accepted and widely studied in all four Jaina traditions (Svetambara, Digambara, Sthanakvasi and Terapantha). His Tattvartha Sutra, also called Daśasūtri, was commented on by numerous Jaina scholars in the centuries that followed, for instance the 8th or 10th century Digambar ācārya Vidyananda.

Umāsvāti's text Tattvartha Sutra was composed in Sanskrit, making it, according to Johnson, the earliest extant Sanskrit language literature related to Jainism. His text was cherished not only by the Jaina traditions, but widely distributed and preserved by the Hindus for centuries. The Hindu theistic scholar Madhvacharya praised Umāsvāti's ideas in the 13th-century, calling him Umasvati Vachakacharya (literally "expressive teacher"), as Madhvacharya developed his sub-school of dualism.

== See also ==
- Haribhadra
- Samantabhadra
- Bhadrabahu
- Sthulabhadra
- Hemchandra
