= Stoppage =

Stoppage can refer to:

- an unplanned time-out in sport
- a technical knockout or corner retirement in combat sports
- a worker's strike action
- a ceasefire in warfare
- Samvara in Jain philosophy
- a firearm malfunction
