= Tattva (Jainism) =

Fundamental elements in Jainism

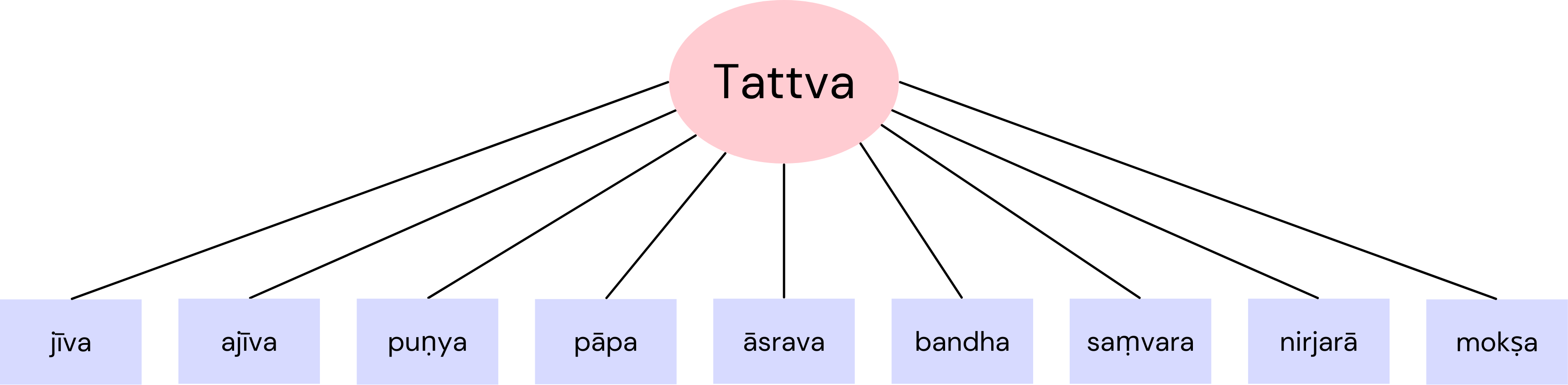
The nine tattvas of Śvetāmbara Jain philosophy

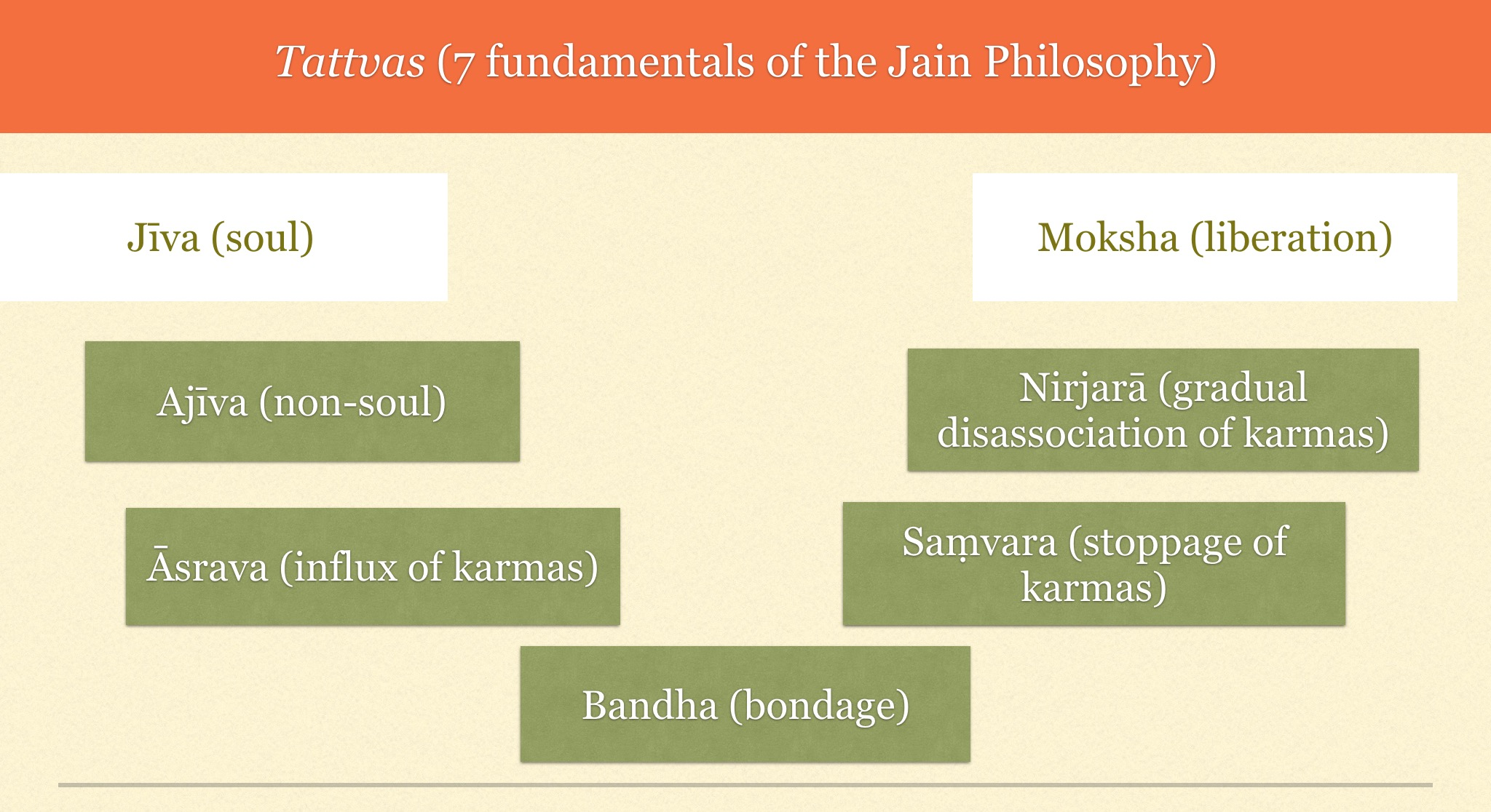
The seven tattvas of Digambara Jain philosophy

Jain philosophy explains that nine (Śvetāmbara tradition) or seven (Digambara tradition) tattva (truths or fundamental principles) constitute reality. These are:

1. jīva – the soul which is characterized by consciousness
2. ajīva – the non-soul
3. puṇya (alms-deed) – which purifies the soul and provide happiness to others
4. pāpa (sinful acts) – which impurifies the soul
5. āsrava (influx) – inflow of auspicious and evil karmic matter into the soul.
6. bandha (bondage) – mutual intermingling of the soul and karmas.
7. saṃvara (stoppage) – obstruction of the inflow of karmic matter into the soul.
8. nirjarā (gradual dissociation) – separation or falling-off of parts of karmic matter from the soul.
9. mokṣa (liberation) – complete annihilation of all karmic matter (bound with any particular soul).

The knowledge of these realities is said to be essential for the liberation of the soul. The Digambara sect believes in the 7 tattvas only (all those that are listed except puṇya and pāpa), while the Śvetāmbara sect believes in all 9 of them. However, the Digambar sect includes the two tattvas within āsrava and bandha. Therefore, beliefs and philosophies of both the sects remain the same.

== Overview ==
The first two are the two ontological categories of the soul jīva and the non-soul ajīva, namely the axiom that they exist. The third truth is that performing wholesome (positive) activities or positive karma, one experiences comfort and happiness in future or a future birth. The fourth truth is the exact opposite of the third – performing negative karma results in adversities and pain in future. The fifth truth is that through the interaction, called yoga, between the two substances, soul and non-soul, karmic matter flows into the soul (āsrava), clings to it, becomes converted into karma and the sixth truth acts as a factor of bondage (bandha), restricting the manifestation of the consciousness intrinsic to it. The seventh truth states that a stoppage (saṃvara) of new karma is possible through asceticism through practice of right conduct, faith and knowledge. An intensification of asceticism burns up the existing karma – this eighth truth is expressed by the word nirjarā. The final truth is that when the soul is freed from the influence of karma, it reaches the goal of Jaina teaching, which is liberation or mokṣa. In Śvetāmbara texts puṇya or spiritual merit and pāpa or spiritual demerit are counted among the fundamental reals. In Digambara texts, the number of tattvas is seven because both puṇya and pāpa are included in āsrava or bandha. According to Digambara text, Sarvārthasiddhi, translates S.A. Jain:

It is not necessary to include these (merit and demerit), as these are implied in influx and bondage. If it were so, the mention of influx etc. is unnecessary, as these are included in the soul and the non-soul. No, it is not unnecessary. Here liberation is the main theme of the work. So that must be mentioned. And that (liberation) is preceded by the cycle of births and deaths. Influx and bondage are the main causes of transmigration. Stoppage and gradual dissociation are the chief causes of liberation. Hence these are mentioned severally in order to indicate the chief causes and effects. It is well-known that the particulars implied in the general are mentioned separately according to needs.

However, Śvetāmbara texts as well as the Śvetāmbara version of the Tattvartha Sutra counts the last two tattvas separately and not within any of the other tattvas because they are considered to be fundamental truths too. That is simply because they may not have another definition and are important considerations.

== Jīva ==
Jainism believes that the souls (jīva) exist as a reality, having a separate existence from the body that houses them. Jīva is characterised by chetana (consciousness) and upayoga (knowledge and perception). Though the soul experiences both birth and death, it is neither really destroyed nor created. Decay and origin refer respectively to the disappearance of one state of the soul and the appearance of another state, these being merely the modes of the soul.

== Ajīva ==
Jiva and ajīva together make up the world. Ajīva refers to the five non-living substances:

- Pudgala (matter) – Matter is classified as solid, liquid, gaseous, energy, fine Karmic materials and extra-fine matter or ultimate particles. Paramānu or ultimate particles are considered the basic building block of all matter. One of the qualities of the Paramānu and Pudgala is that of permanence and indestructibility. It combines and changes its modes but its basic qualities remain the same. According to Jainism, it cannot be created nor destroyed.
- Dharma-tattva (medium of motion) and Adharma-tattva (medium of rest) – They are also known as Dharmāstikāya and Adharmāstikāya. They are unique to Jain thought depicting the principles of motion and rest. They are said to pervade the entire universe. Dharma-tattva and adharma-tattva are by themselves not motion or rest but mediate motion and rest in other bodies. Without dharmāstikāya motion is not possible and without adharmāstikāya rest is not possible in the universe.
- Ākāśa (space) – Space is a substance that accommodates souls, matter, the principle of motion, the principle of rest, and time. It is all-pervading, infinite and made of infinite space-points.
- Kāla (time) – Time is a real entity according to Jainism and all activities, changes or modifications can be achieved only through time. In Jainism, the time is likened to a wheel with twelve spokes divided into descending and ascending halves with six stages, each of immense duration estimated at billions of sagaropama or ocean years. According to Jains, sorrow increases at each progressive descending stage and happiness and bliss increase in each progressive ascending stage.

== Puṇya ==
Performing wholesome actions leads to binding of puṇya (good karma) to the soul. Śvetāmbara scriptures describe several benefits of binding puṇya to one's soul. A soul may be reborn in a high household or a good family (high gotra-karma) as in the case of the Tirthankaras. A soul may attain a high status or an excellent and righteous life. These are just a few cases amongst many that are the positive results of performing puṇya. The reason Śvetāmbaras consider it to be a fundamental truth is that it may not have another definition and is an important principle in the attainment of the final truth mokṣa.

== Pāpa ==
Pāpa refers to karma that binds to the soul on performance of sinful actions. Any action that is fundamentally sinful as described by the aagamas is considered to bind pāpa to the soul. By performing negative actions that lead to the binding of pāpa to the soul, it becomes difficult for the soul to achieve enlightenment and eventual mokṣa. The repercussions of binding pāpa make the soul suffer pain and adversity in future or in future births. Several negative effects of binding pāpa to the soul have been described in the canonical scriptures. Some of them include birth in a low family, infirmities, little to no access to knowledge, and false worship.

== Āsrava ==
Asrava (influx of karma) refers to the influence of body and mind causing the soul to generate karma. It occurs when the karmic particles are attracted to the soul on account of vibrations created by activities of the mind, speech and body.

The āsrava, that is, the influx of karma occurs when the karmic particles are attracted to the soul on account of vibrations created by activities of the mind, speech and body. Tattvārthasūtra, 6:1–2 states: "The activities of body, speech and mind are called yoga. This three-fold action results in āsrava or influx of karma."

The karmic inflow on account of yoga driven by passions and emotions causes a long term inflow of karma prolonging the cycle of reincarnations. On the other hand, the karmic inflows on account of actions that are not driven by passions and emotions have only a transient, short-lived karmic effect.

== Bandha ==
The karmas have an effect only when they are bound to the consciousness. This binding of karma to the consciousness is called bandha. However, yoga or the activities alone do not produce bondage. Out of the many causes of bondage, passion is considered the main cause of bondage. The karmas are literally bound on account of the stickiness of the soul due to the existence of various passions or mental dispositions.

== Saṃvara ==
Saṃvara is the stoppage of karma. The first step to the emancipation or the realization of the self is to see that all channels through which karma has been flowing into the soul have been stopped, so that no additional karma can accumulate. This is referred to as the stoppage of the inflow of karma (saṃvara). There are two kinds of saṃvara: that which is concerned with mental life (bhava-saṃvara), and that which refers to the removal of karmic particles (dravya- saṃvara). This stoppage is possible through self-control and freedom from attachment. The practice of vows, carefulness, self-control, the observance of ten kinds of dharma, meditation, and the removal of various obstacles, such as hunger, thirst, and passion stops the inflow of karma and protects the soul from the impurities of fresh karma.

== Nirjarā ==
Nirjarā is the shedding or destruction of karmas that has already accumulated. Nirjarā is of two types: the psychic aspect of the removal of karma (bhāva-nirjarā) and the destruction of the particles of karma (dravya-nirjarā). Karma may exhaust itself in its natural course when its fruits are completely exhausted. In this, no effort is required. The remaining karma has to be removed by means of penance (avipaka-nirjarā). The soul is like a mirror which looks dim when the dust of karma is deposited on its surface. When karma is removed by destruction, the soul shines in its pure and transcendent form. It then attains the goal of mokṣha.

== Mokṣa ==
Moksha (mokṣa) means liberation, salvation or emancipation of soul. As per Jainism, mokṣa is the attainment of an altogether different state of the soul, completely free of the karmic bondage, free of samsara (the cycle of birth and death). It means the removal of all the impurities of karmic matter and the body, characterized by the inherent qualities of the soul such as knowledge and bliss free from pain and suffering. Right faith, right knowledge, and right conduct (together) constitute the path to liberation. A liberated soul is said to have attained its true and pristine nature of infinite bliss, infinite knowledge and infinite perception. In Jainism, it is the highest and the noblest objective that a soul should strive to achieve. It fact, it is the only objective that a person should have; other objectives are contrary to the true nature of soul. That is why, Jainism is also known as mokṣamārga or the “path to liberation”.

== See also ==
- Jain Philosophy
- Jain Cosmology
