= Saṃsāra in Jainism =

Jain concept of continuous rebirths and reincarnations in various realms of existence

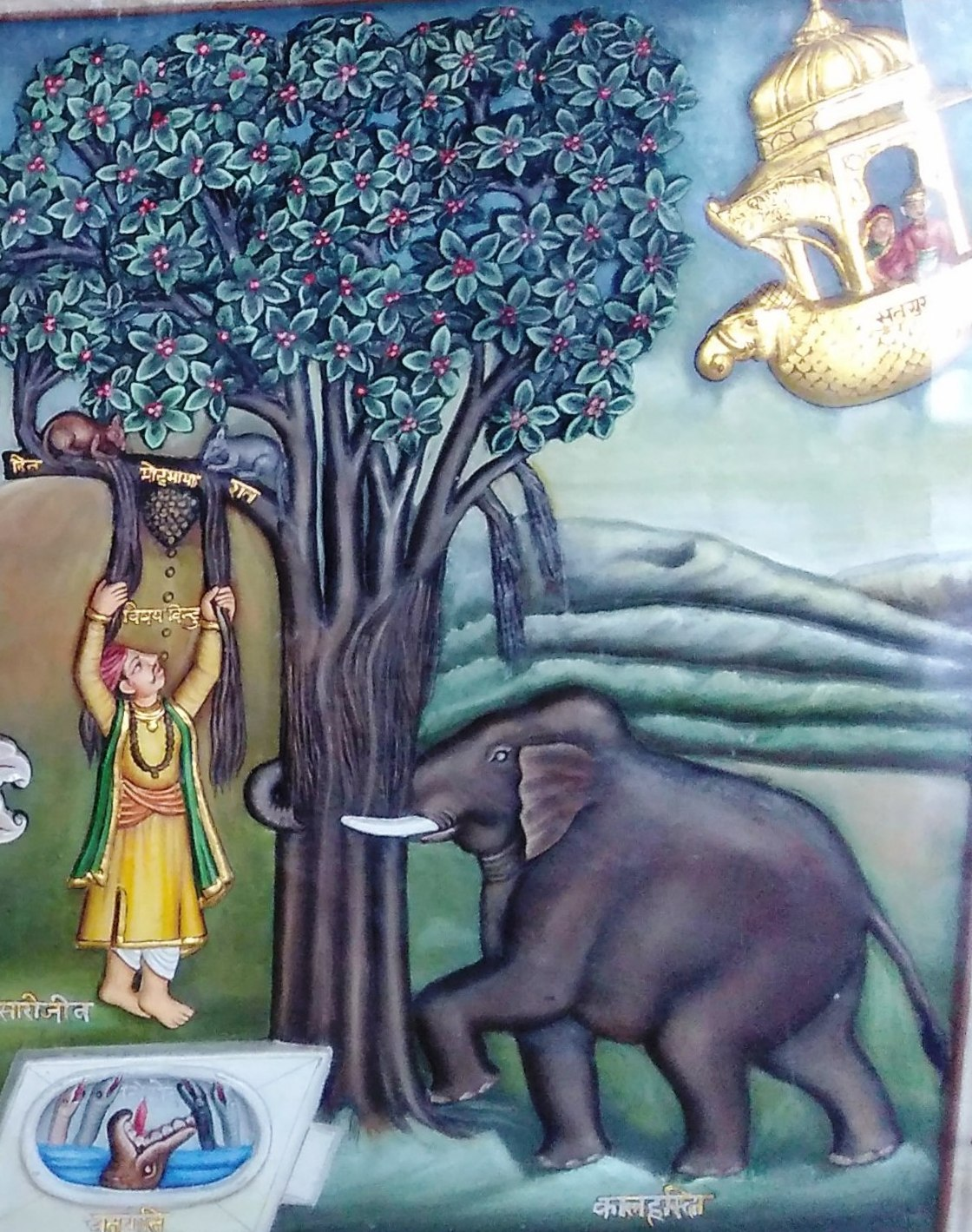
Symbolic depiction of Saṃsāra

Saṃsāra in Jain philosophy (Sanskrit: संसार, romanized: saṃsāra, lit. 'transmigration') refers to the worldly life characterized by continuous reincarnations in various realms of existence. Saṃsāra is described as mundane existence, a life full of suffering and misery, and hence it is considered undesirable and worth renouncing. Saṃsāra, and with it bondage to karma, is beginning-less. Moksha is the only way to be liberated from saṃsāra.

== Influx of karmas (asrava) ==
According to the Jain text Tattvartha Sutra:

(There are two kinds of influx, namely) that of persons with passions, which extends transmigration, and that of persons free from passions, which prevents or shortens it.

— Tattvārthsūtra (6-4-81)

Activities that lead to the influx of karmas (asrava) which extends transmigration are:

- Five senses
- Four passions (kasāya)
  - Anger
  - Ego
  - Deceit
  - Greed
- The non-observance of the five vows
- Non-observance of the twenty-five activities like Righteousness

Saṃsāra bhavanā

Jain texts prescribe meditation on twelve forms of reflection (bhāvanā) for those who wish to stop the above described asrava. One such reflection is Saṃsāra bhavanā.

It has been described in one of the Jain text, Sarvārthasiddhi as:

Transmigration is the attainment of another birth by the self owing to the ripening of karmas. The five kinds of whirling round have been described already. He, who wanders in the endless cycle of births and deaths, undergoing millions of afflictions in innumerable wombs and families, takes different relationships such as father, brother, son, grandson, etc, or mother, sister, wife, daughter and so on, being propelled by the mechanism of karmas. The master becomes servant and the servant master, just as an actor acts several parts on the stage. To be brief, sometimes one becomes one's own son. There is no end to the transformations undergone by the self owing to the influence of karmas. Thus to reflect on the nature of mundane existence is contemplation on worldly existence. He who contemplates thus is alarmed at the miseries of transmigration and becomes disgusted with worldly existence. And he who is disgusted with it endeavours to free himself from it.

Champat Rai Jain, a 20th-century Jain writer, in his book The Practical Dharma, wrote:

Endless is the cycle of transmigration; painful is every form of life; there is no happiness in any of the four conditions of existence; devas, human beings, animals and residents of hells are all involved in pain and misery of some kind or other; moksha alone is blissful and free from pain; the wise should, therefore, only aspire for moksha; all other conditions are temporary and painful."

== See also ==
- Jain cosmology
