= Moksha in Jainism =

Liberation or salvation of a soul from saṃsāra, the cycle of birth and death

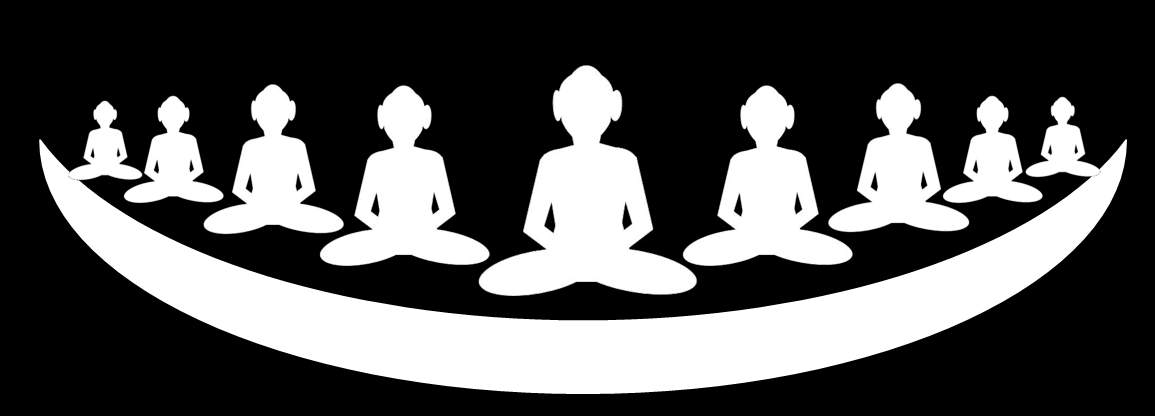
Depiction of Siddha Shila as per Jain cosmology which is abode of infinite Siddhas

Sanskrit moksha or Prakrit mokkha refers to the liberation or salvation of a soul from saṃsāra, the cycle of birth and death. It is a blissful state of existence of a soul, attained after the destruction of all karmic bonds. A liberated soul is said to have attained its true and pristine nature of unlimited bliss, unlimited knowledge and unlimited perception. Such a soul is called siddha and is revered in Jainism.

In Jainism, moksha is the highest and the noblest objective that a soul should strive to achieve. In fact, it is the only objective that a person should have; other objectives are contrary to the true nature of soul. With the right view, knowledge and efforts all souls can attain this state. That is why Jainism is also known as mokṣamārga or the "path to liberation".

According to the Sacred Jain Text, Tattvartha sutra:

Owing to the absence of the cause of bondage and with the functioning of the dissociation of karmas the annihilation of all karmas is liberation.

— Tattvārthsūtra (10-2)

== Bhavyata ==
From the point of view of the potentiality of mokṣa, Jain texts bifurcates the souls into two categories: bhavya and abhavya. Bhavya souls are those souls who have faith in mokṣa and hence will make some efforts to achieve liberation. This potentiality or quality is called bhavyata. However, bhavyata itself does not guarantee mokṣa, as the soul needs to make the necessary efforts to attain it. On the other hand, abhavya souls are those souls who cannot attain liberation as they do not have faith in mokṣa and hence never make any efforts to attain it.

== The path to liberation ==
=== Three jewels ===
According to Jainism, purification of soul and liberation can be achieved through the path of three jewels:

1. samyak darśana (correct view), meaning faith, acceptance of the truth of soul (jīva);
2. samyak jnana (correct knowledge), meaning undoubting knowledge of the tattvas;
3. samyak charitra (correct conduct), meaning behavior consistent with the Five vows. It consists in following austerities, engaging in right activities and observance of vows, carefulness and controls.
4. samyak tap (correct asceticism) is often added as a fourth jewel in Jain texts, emphasizing belief in ascetic practices as the means to liberation (moksha).

The four jewels are called moksha marg. According to Acharya KundaKunda's Samayasara:

Belief in the nine substances as they are is right faith (samyagdarśana). Knowledge of these substances without doubt, delusion or misapprehension, is right knowledge (samyagjñāna). Being free from attachment etc. is right conduct (samyakcāritra). These three, together, constitute the path to liberation.

=== Fourteen stages ===
The fourteen stages on the path to liberation are called Gunasthāna. These are:

Gunasthāna (Stages on the Path)	Meaning
1. Mithyātva	The stage of wrong believer (Gross ignorance)
2. Sasādana	Downfall from right faith
3. Misradrsti	Mixed right and wrong belief
4. Avirata samyagdrsti	Vowless right belief
5. Deśavirata	The stage of partial self-control
6. Pramattasamyata	Slightly imperfect vows
7. Apramatta samyata	Perfect vows (Mahavratas)
8. Apūrvakaraņa	New thought-activity
9. Anivāttibādara-sāmparāya	Advanced thought-activity (Passions are still occurring)
10. Sukshma samparaya	Slightest delusion
11. Upaśānta-kasāya	Subsided delusion
12. Ksīna kasāya	Destroyed delusion
13. Sayoga kevali	Omniscience with vibration (destruction of all inimical karmas)
14. Ayoga kevali	The stage of omniscience without any activity

Those who pass the last stage are called siddha and become fully established in Right Faith, Right Knowledge and Right Conduct.

=== Liberation ===
Nirvāna means the final release from the karmic bondage. When an enlightened human, such as an Arihant or a Tirthankara, extinguishes his remaining aghatiya karmas and thus ends his worldly existence, it is called nirvāna. Technically, the death of an Arhat is called nirvāṇa, as he has ended his worldly existence and attained liberation. Moksha (liberation) follows nirvāṇa. However, the terms moksa and nirvana are often used interchangeably in Jain texts. An Arhat becomes a siddha, the liberated one, after attaining nirvana.

In that night in which the Venerable Ascetic Mahavira died, freed from all pains, the eighteen confederate kings of Kasi and Kosala, the nine Mallakis and the nine Licchavis, on the day of the new moon, instituted illuminations on the Poshadha, which was a fasting day; for they said: 'Since the light of intelligence is gone, let us make an illumination of material matter!'(128)

Once a soul secures samyaktva, mokṣa is assured within a few lifetimes. According to Jain texts, the liberated pure soul (Siddha) ascends to the summit of the universe (Siddhashila) and dwells there in eternal bliss.

A liberated soul dwells in Siddhashila with infinite faith, infinite knowledge, infinite perception, and infinite perfection. According to the Jain text, Puruşārthasiddhyupāya:

Having achieved the ultimate goal, knowing everything that needs to be known, and enjoying eternal and supreme bliss, the Omniscient, Effulgent Soul rests permanently in the Highest State (of liberation).

— Puruşārthasiddhyupāya (224)

== See also ==
- Nirvana Kanda
- Sallekhana

== Sources ==
- Cort, John E. (2001a), Jains in the World : Religious Values and Ideology in India, Oxford University Press, ISBN 978-0-19-513234-2
- Fohr, Sherry (2015), Jainism: A Guide for the Perplexed, Bloomsbury Publishing, ISBN 978-1-4742-2756-8
- Jain, Maganlal (1951). Bhed Vigyan Sar.
- Jain, S. A. (1992) [First edition 1960], Reality (English Translation of Srimat Pujyapadacharya's Sarvarthasiddhi) (Second ed.), Jwalamalini Trust, " This article incorporates text from this source, which is in the public domain."
- Jain, Vijay K. (2011), Acharya Umasvami's Tattvarthsutra (1st ed.), Uttarakhand: Vikalp Printers, ISBN 978-81-903639-2-1, " This article incorporates text from this source, which is in the public domain."
- Jain, Vijay K. (2012), Acharya Amritchandra's Purushartha Siddhyupaya: Realization of the Pure Self, With Hindi and English Translation, Vikalp Printers, ISBN 978-81-903639-4-5, " This article incorporates text from this source, which is in the public domain."
- Jain, Vijay K. (2012a), Samaya Sara Of Acharya Kundkund, Vikalp Printers
- Jain, Vijay K. (2014), Acarya Pujyapada's Istopadesa – the Golden Discourse, Vikalp Printers, ISBN 978-81-903639-6-9, " This article incorporates text from this source, which is in the public domain."
- Jaini, Padmanabh S. (1998) [1979], The Jaina Path of Purification, Delhi: Motilal Banarsidass, ISBN 81-208-1578-5
- Jaini, Padmanabh S., ed. (2000), Collected Papers On Jaina Studies (First ed.), Delhi: Motilal Banarsidass, ISBN 81-208-1691-9
- Sangave, Vilas Adinath (1980), Jain Community: A Social Survey (2nd ed.), Bombay: Popular Prakashan, ISBN 978-0-317-12346-3
- Yogindra (1915). Parmatma-prakāś. The Central Jaina Publishing.
