= Nirjara =

One of the seven fundamental principles in Jain philosophy

Nirjara is one of the seven fundamental principles, or Tattva in Jain philosophy, and refers to the shedding or removal of accumulated karmas from the atma (soul), essential for breaking free from samsara, the cycle of birth-death and rebirth, by achieving moksha, liberation.

Literally meaning "falling off", the concept is described first in chapter 9 of the classical Jain text, Tattvartha Sutra (True nature of Reality) written by Acharya Umasvati, in 2nd century CE, the only text authoritative in both Śvetāmbara and Digambara sects of Jainism. Later it also finds mention in Dravyasamgraha (Compendium of substances), a 10th-century Jain text by Acharya Nemichandra.

== Preparation ==
Nirjara is preceded by stoppage of karma accumulation, or samvara, thereby ending asrava or influx of karma which leads to bandha or bondage due kasaya or passions of the soul, namely, krodha (anger), lobha (greed), mana (ego) and maya (deceit), besides raaga (attachment) and dvesa (hatred). Dravyasamgraha explains that the soul becomes dim due to the dust of karmic matter, thus nirjara itself offers a way to clear the soul, and ultimately leading to moksha, liberation.

== Types of Nirjara ==
Nirjara is of two types, Bhava Nirjara, modification of soul which leads to separation of karmic matter from the soul, and Dravya Nirjara, actual separation of karmic matter from the soul. In turn, bhava nirjara is of two types, Savipaka and Avipaka.

=== Savipaka Nirjara ===
Savipaka - Passive Method - Also known as Akam or unintentional Nirjara, equanimous submission to the fruition of karma, and involves natural maturing of past Karma, in due course of time and experiencing the results, both good and bad with equanimity. If the fruits of the past karmas are not received without attachment or agitation then the soul earns fresh karmic bondages. It is also not possible for the soul to know beforehand when and which karma will start to produce results and therefore require good discipline in practicing equanimity under all circumstances.

This passive method of exhaustion of karmic matter around the soul, after enjoyment of its fruits, is compared with emptying of a pond through evaporation, while water channels are still pouring in. Naturally it is a slow method, as by the time karmas become ripe and are exhausted, new karmas fill in, as karmic matter is constantly pouring into the karma sharira (karmic body), through asrava, influx of karma. Thus to achieve liberation, the active method of purging off karma, avipaka nirjara is advised.

=== Avipaka Nirjara ===
Avipaka - Active Method - Also known as Sakam or intentional Nirjara, it involves individual exertion of ascetic practices, by practicing internal and external austerities, like penances or tapas, literally meaning heat, so as to accelerate the ripening process as well as reducing the effects produced. This is recommended approach as it prepares and conditions the soul and reminds it to be vigilant. Tapas is of two kinds, bahya or external, and antaranga or internal.

==== Bahya tapas ====
The Bahya or bahiranga tapa, external austerities are meant to discipline the sensual cravings, and prepares the person for internal austerities, which come next.

1. Anasana - Fasting, purifies sense organs, lessens sense of attachment to bodily enjoyments
2. Avamodarya or Alpahara - Eating less than one's normal diet, removed laziness/lethargy and brings in fresh energy to the mind
3. Vritti parisankhyana or Vrita sankshepa - Restriction of certain kinds or number of food
4. Rasa parityaga -Daily renunciation of one or more of 6 kinds of Rasas delicacies: ghee (butter, clarified butter), milk, curd, sugar, salt, oil. Abstention from tasty and stimulating food
5. Vivikta shayyasana - Sleeping in a lonely place, practicing solitude and introspection
6. Kaya-klesha - Bodily Endurance, practicing body austerities to get over attachment to bodily comfort

At some places, alternative to this list include, Ichhanirodha, control of desire for food and material things.

==== Antaranga tapas ====
The antaranga tapa, internal austerities which follow are:

1. Prayaschita - Atonement/penance for sinful acts
2. Vinaya - Practice politeness and humility
3. Vaiyavritya - Service to others, especially monks, nuns, elders and the weaker souls without any expectations in return
4. Swadhyaya - Self-study, scriptural study, questioning and expanding the spiritual knowledge
5. Vyutsarga - Abandonment of passions - especially anger, ego, deceit and greed, distinction between body and soul
6. Dhyana - Meditation and contemplation

All the first five internal austerities and all six external austerities are preparatory steps for the practice of dhyana, which is the primary cause of moksha.

For layman the journey begins with practicing the Triple gems of Jainism, Ratnatraya, namely Right View or perception (Samyak Darshana), Right knowledge (Samyak Gyana) and Right conduct (Samyak Charitra), which constitute the path to liberation. The monks in Jainism, who have dedicated their lives to achieve, moksha and acquiring the Kevala Jnana, absolute knowledge, however go on to take the five Mahavrata, literally Great Vows, of self-control:

1. Non-violence (Ahimsa)
2. Truth (Satya)
3. Non-stealing (Asteya)
4. Chastity (Brahmacharya)
5. Non-possession/Non-attachment (Aparigraha) .

Apart from that, the monks also practices, three Guptis and five Samitis. Three Restraints (Gupti), i.e., Control of the mind (Managupti), Control of speech (Vacanagupti), Control of body (Kayagupti); and Five Carefulness (Samiti) i.e. Carefulness while walking (Irya Samiti), Carefulness while communicating (Bhasha Samiti), Carefulness while eating (Eshana Samiti), Carefulness while handling their fly-whisks, water gourds, etc. (Adana Nikshepana Samiti), Carefulness while disposing of bodily waste matter (Pratishthapana Samiti)

According to Umaswati in Tattvartha Sutra 10.1.2, Kevala Jnana, absolute knowledge or Omniscience, comes only after, the Mohaniya karma are first destroyed, followed by Jnanavaraniya karma, Darsanavarana karma and Antaraya karma. However, after attaining the Kevala jnana, the causes of bandha, bondage end, thus the influx of Karma, asrava, ends as well, thus the person is freed from the Aghatiya karmas namely, Ayu karma, Nama karma, Gotra karma and Vedaniya karma, which cause worldly existence. Emptied of karma the person attains liberation.

== See also ==
- Types of Karma (Jainism)
