= Tattvartha Sutra =

Jain religious text

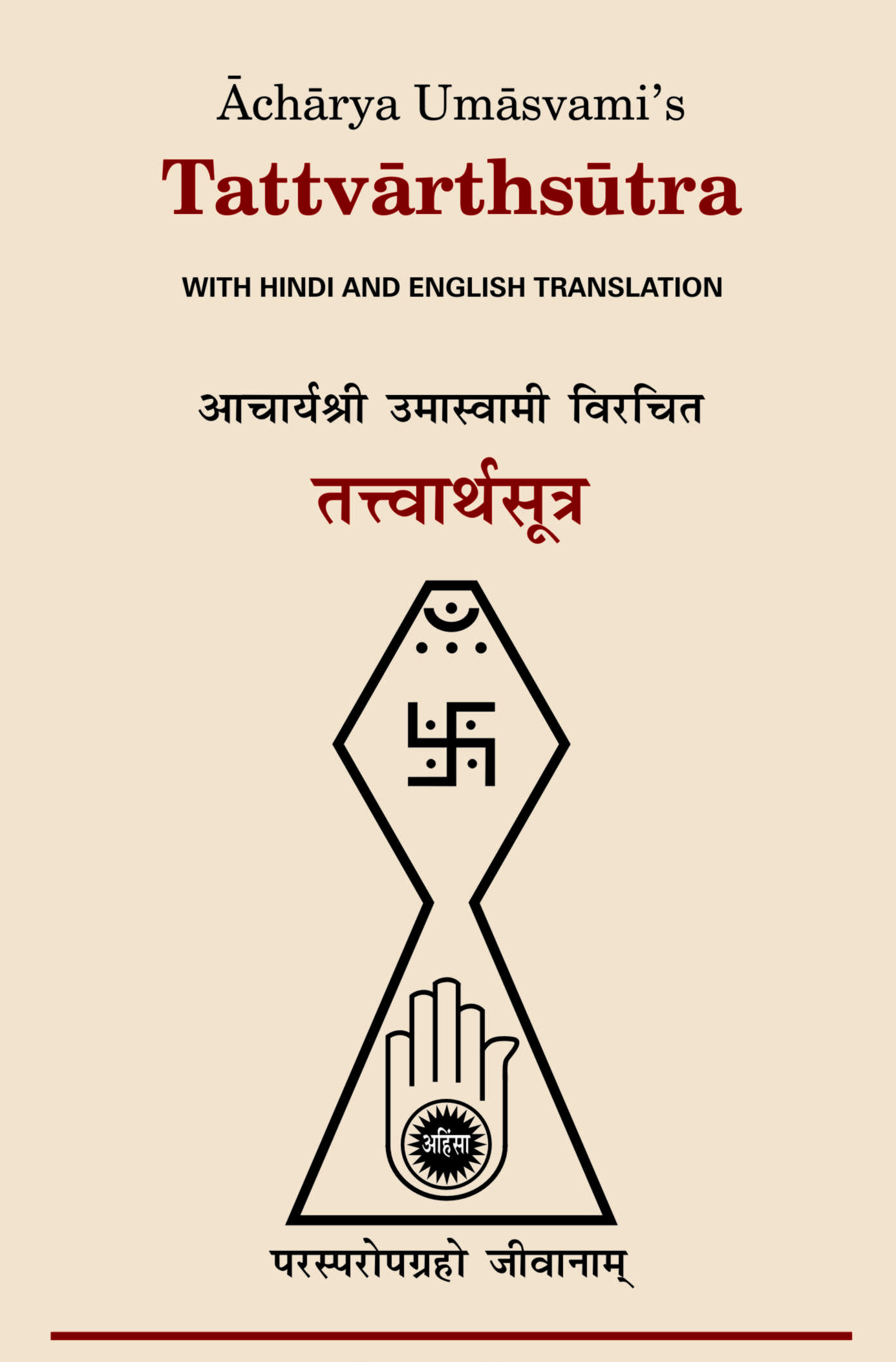
- Tattvartha sutra

Information
- Religion: Jainism
- Author: Umaswami
- Language: Sanskrit
- Period: 2nd to 5th century
- Chapters: 10
- Sutras: 350

Tattvārthasūtra, meaning "On the Nature [artha] of Reality [tattva]" (also known as Tattvarth-adhigama-sutra or Moksha-shastra) is a Jain text written by Acharya Umaswami in Sanskrit between the 2nd and 5th centuries CE.

The Tattvārthasūtra is regarded as one of the earliest, most authoritative texts in Jainism. It is accepted as authoritative in both of its major sub-traditions – Digambara and Śvētāmbara – as well as the minor sub-traditions. It is a philosophical text, and its importance in Jainism is comparable to that of the Brahma Sutras and Yoga Sutras of Patanjali in Hinduism. Written in the aphoristic sutra style, characteristic of ancient Indian texts, it presents the complete Jainism philosophy in 350 sutras over 10 chapters. The text has attracted numerous commentaries, translations and interpretations, since the 5th century CE.

One of its sutras, Parasparopagraho Jivanam is the motto of Jainism. Its meaning is interpreted as "(The function) of souls is to help one another", or "Souls render service to one another".

== Names ==
Tattvartha Sutra is also known in Jainism as the Moksha-shastra (Scripture describing the path of liberation).

== Content ==
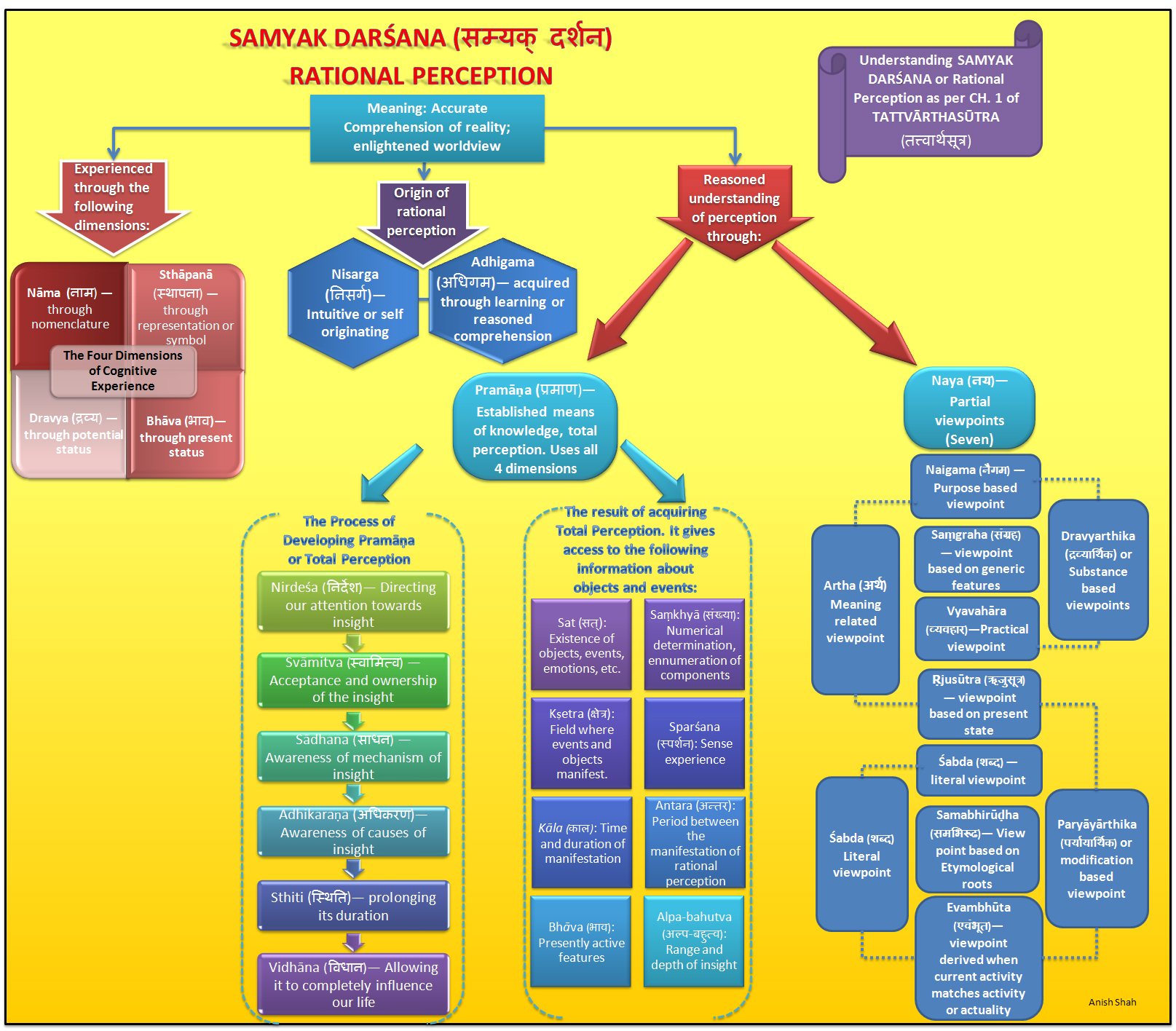
Chart showing Samyak Darsana as per Tattvarthasutra

The Tattvartha Sutra contains ten chapters:

1. Faith and Knowledge
2. The Category of the Living
3. The Lower World and the Middle World
4. The Celestial Beings
5. The Category of the Non-Living
6. Influx of Karma
7. The Five Vows
8. Bondage of Karma
9. Stoppage and Shedding of Karma
10. Liberation

The first chapter deals with the process of cognition and describes different types of knowledge. The next three chapters deal with the Jīva (soul), the lower worlds, naraka, and the celestial abodes, devas. The fifth chapter discusses the non-soul (ajīva). The next three chapters deal with the karmas and their manifestations, the influx (asrava), good and bad karma (shubha-ashubha karma) and the bondage of the karmas. The ninth chapter describes the blocking (samvara) and shedding of the karmas( nirjara). The final chapter discusses moksha or the liberation of the soul.

=== Invocation ===
The text written in Sanskrit, begins with an invocation: "I bow to the Lord, the promulgator of the path to liberation, the destroyer of mountains of karmas and the knower of the whole of reality, so that I may realize these qualities."

=== Ratnatraya (three jewels) ===
The first verse of Tattvārthsūtra, "सम्यग्दर्शनज्ञानचारित्राणि मोक्षमार्ग:" (samyag-darśana-jñāna-cāritrāṇi mokṣamārgaḥ), summarizes the Jaina path to liberation. It means that the Ratnatraya (three jewels: right view, right knowledge and right conduct) collectively constitutes the path to liberation or moksha.

=== Seven categories of truth ===
The theology in Tattvartha Sutra presents seven categories of truth in sutra 1.4:

1. Souls exist (Jīva)
2. Non-sentient matter exists (Ajīva)
3. Karmic particles exist that inflow to each soul (Āsrava)
4. Karmic particles bind to the soul {which transmigrate with rebirth} (Bandha)
5. Karmic particles inflow can be stopped (Saṃvara)
6. Karmic particles can fall away from soul (Nirjara)
7. Complete release of karmic particles leads to liberation from worldly bondage (Moksha)

Umaswami categorizes the types of knowledge to be empirical, attained through one's sense of perception. He adds that knowledge is also acquired through literature, clairvoyance, and omniscience. In chapter 2, Umaswati presents sutras on soul. He asserts that soul is distinguished by suppression of deluding karma, or elimination of eight types of karmas, or partial presence of destructive karmas, or arising of eight types of new karmas, or those that are innate to the soul, or a combination of these. In chapter 3 through 6, Umaswati presents sutras for his first three categories of truth.

=== Ethics ===
In chapter 7, Umaswami presents the Jaina vows and explains their value in stopping karmic particle inflow to the soul. The vows, with their respective translations by Nathmal Tatia, are:

- ahimsa (abstinence from violence)
- anirta (abstinence from falsehood)
- asteya / achourya (abstinence from stealing)
- brahmacharya (abstinence from carnality)
- aparigraha (abstinence from possessiveness)

=== Karma and rebirths ===
Umaswati, in chapter 8 of Tattvartha Sutra presents his sutras on how karma affects rebirths. He asserts that accumulated karma in life determines the length of life and realm of rebirth for each soul in each of four states – infernal beings, plants and animals, human beings and as gods. Further, states Umaswati, karma also affects the body, the shape, the characteristics as well as the status of the soul within the same species, such as Ucchi (upper) or Nicchi (lower) status. The accumulated and new karma are material particles, states Umaswati, which stick to the soul and these travel with the soul from one life to the next as bondage, where each ripens. Once ripened, the karmic particles fall off, states Umaswati.

=== Shedding karma and liberation ===
Chapter 9 of Tattvartha Sutra states how karmic particles can be stopped from attaching to the soul and how these can be shed. Umaswati asserts that gupti (curbing activity), dharma (virtues such as forbearance, modesty, purity, truthfulness, self-restraint, austerity, renunciation), contemplation, endurance in hardship (he lists twenty-two hardships including hunger, thirst, cold, heat, nakedness, injury, lack of gain, illness, praise, disrespect), and with good character towards others (he lists five – equanimity, reinitiation, non-injury (Ahimsa), slight passion and fair conduct), a soul stops karmic accumulations. External austerities such as fasting, reduced diet and isolated habitation, along with internal austerities such as expiation, reverence, service, renunciation and meditation, according to Umaswati, along with respectful service to teachers and ailing ascetics help shed karma.

The state of liberation is presented in Chapter 10 by Umaswati. It is achieved when deluding and obstructive karmas have been destroyed. This leads to the state of quietism and potentiality, and the soul then moves to the end of the universe, states Umaswati.

== Importance ==
The Tattvartha Sutra is regarded as one of the earliest, most authoritative book on Jainism, and the only text authoritative in both the Digambara and Śvētāmbara sects, and its importance in Jainism is comparable with that of the Brahma Sutras and Yoga Sutras of Patanjali in Hinduism.

== Commentaries ==
The Tattvartha Sutra has the largest number of Jaina bhashyas or commentaries in different Indian languages from the fifth century onward. There are over twenty-five commentaries and translations of Tattvartha Sutra, including those by:

- Uma-svati Vachaka
- Vadi-gaja-gandha-hastin
- Siddha-sena Divakara
- Siddha-sena Gani
- Haribhadra and Yashobhadra
- Nagara Vachaka
- Malaya-giri
- Yashovijaya Upadhyaya
- Samanta-bhadra
- Deva-nandin Pujya-pada
- Akalanka
- Padmanabha
- Vidya-nandin
- Yoga-deva
- Prabha-chandra
- Shruta-sagara
- Bala-chandra
- Jayanta Pandita
- Bhaskara-nandin
- Kamala-kirti
- Divakara-bhatta
- Magha-nandin
- Vibudha-sena
- Lakshmi-deva
- Shubha-chandra
- Yogindra-deva
- Devi-dasa
- Ravi-nanda
- Padma-kirti
- Kanaka-kirti
- Rajendra Maulin
- Sivakoti
- Ratna-simha
- Prabha-chandra

Śvetāmbaras believe that Umasvati himself wrote Svopajña Bhāṣya, a commentary on the text. In turn, Svopajña Bhāṣya Ṭīkā is a commentary by Siddhasenagaṇi on the Svopajña Bhāṣya. The next oldest and the most famous commentary on the Tattvārthasūtra is Sarvārthasiddhi of Ācārya Pujyapada (sixth century CE). Sarvārthasiddhi (a commentary on the Tattvartha Sutra written by Pūjyapāda Devanandi), along with Akalanka's c. 780 CE Rajavartika and Vijayananda's Slokavarttika (9th century), form the central texts of Digambara monastic students.

== Translations ==
The text is in sutra form. The word Sutra (Sanskrit: सूत्र) means "string, thread". The root of the word is siv, that which sews and holds things together. In the context of Indian literature, Sutra means a distilled collection of syllables and words, any form or manual of "aphorism, rule, direction" hanging together like threads with which the "teachings of ritual, philosophy, grammar or any field of knowledge" can be woven.

The distilled nature of sutra texts leave them open to varying interpretations. The Tattvartha sutra have been variously translated. The first verse of Tattvartha Sutra has been translated as follows, for example:

"The enlightened darsana (world view), enlightened knowledge and enlightened conduct are the path to liberation" – Translated by Nathmal Tatia

"Right faith, right knowledge and right conduct constitute the path to liberation" – Translated by Vijay Jain

— Umaswati, Tattvartha Sutra 1.1

The text has been translated into many languages including English and German, latest being English translation in 1993.

== See also ==
- Umaswati
- Jain literature
- Tattva (Jainism)

== Sources ==
- Cort, John E. (2001), Jains in the World : Religious Values and Ideology in India, Oxford University Press, ISBN 0-19-513234-3
- Dasti, Matthew R.; Bryant, Edwin F., eds. (2014), Free Will, Agency, and Selfhood in Indian Philosophy, Oxford University Press, ISBN 978-0-19-992274-1
- Dundas, Paul (2002) [1992], The Jains (Second ed.), London and New York: Routledge, ISBN 0-415-26605-X
- Jain, S.A. (1992) [First edition 1960], Reality (English Translation of Srimat Pujyapadacharya's Sarvarthasiddhi) (Second ed.), Jwalamalini Trust, " This article incorporates text from this source, which is in the public domain."
- Jain, Vijay K. (2011), Acharya Umasvami's Tattvarthsutra (1st ed.), Uttarakhand: Vira Sasana Sangha, ISBN 978-81-903639-2-1, " This article incorporates text from this source, which is in the public domain."
- Jaini, Padmanabh S. (1998) [1979], The Jaina Path of Purification, Delhi: Motilal Banarsidass, ISBN 81-208-1578-5
- Jones, Constance; Ryan, James D. (2007), Encyclopedia of Hinduism, Infobase Publishing, ISBN 978-0816054589
- Oldmeadow, Harry, ed. (2007), Light from the East: Eastern Wisdom for the Modern West, World Wisdom, ISBN 978-1-933316-22-2
- Sangave, Vilas Adinath (1980), Jain Community: A Social Survey (2nd ed.), Bombay: Popular Prakashan, ISBN 978-0-317-12346-3
- Shah, Natubhai (2004) [First published in 1998], Jainism: The World of Conquerors, vol. I, Motilal Banarsidass, ISBN 81-208-1938-1
- Umāsvāti (1994). That Which Is. Translated by Tatia Nathmal. Rowman & Littlefield. ISBN 978-0-06-068985-8.
- Sanghvi, S. (1974). Pt. Sukhlalji’s Commentary on Tattvārthasūtra of Vācaka Umāsvāti, trans. K. K. Dixit. Ahmedabad.
