= Bandha (Jainism) =

Interaction of soul and matter in Jainism (Indian religion)

Bandha (also karma-bandha), translated as bondage, refers to the assimilation of karmic matter by the soul, which happens when the soul is influenced by passions and results in a mutual association between the soul and karmas. This association does not destroy the inherent properties of either, but affects their functions to varying degrees. Bandha (Bondage) comes immediately after the asrava (influx of karmas).

== Overview ==
According to the Jain text Tattvartha sutra (in shloka 8.1), the activities that causes the bondage (or bandha) are:

- Wrong belief (mithyā-darśana)
- Non-abstinence (avirati)
- Negligence (pramāda)
- Passions (kaṣāya)

According to the Jain text Samayasāra, a right believer is free from the karma-bandha i.e. bondage.

Champat Rai Jain, an influential Jain writer of the 20th century in his book The Key of Knowledge wrote:

The next thing to understand in this connection is the effect of the action of matter on the soul. We have said that the fusion of spirit and matter results in the bondage of the soul. This is literally true; for the union of substances always tends to limit their natural functions, though new properties and faculties arise in consequence of it. As hydrogen and oxygen, which are gaseous by nature, are robbed of their natural ‘freedom’, i.e., of their gaseous nature, by combining with each other in the form of water, so does the soul become crippled in respect of its natural functions in consequence of its union with matter. This is the bondage, meaning, as it does, the suspension and vitiation of the natural functions and properties of the soul-substance, which are held in check for the time being...

== Classification ==
The bondage is of four kinds according to the Tattvartha sutra (in shloka 8.3):

1. according to the nature or species (prakṛti) of karma
2. depending upon the duration (sthiti) of karma
3. fruition (anubhava/anubhāga) of karma
4. the quantity of space-points (pradeśa) of karma

== See also ==
- Types of Karma

== Sources ==
- Jain, Vijay K. (2011), Acharya Umasvami's Tattvārthsūtra, Vikalp Printers, ISBN 978-81-903639-2-1, "Non-Copyright"
- S. A. Jain (1992). Reality. Jwalamalini Trust. "Not in Copyright" Alt URL
