= Vilas Adinath Sangave =

Indian sociologist and Jainologist (1920–2011)

Professor Vilas Adinath Sangave
- Born: 2 June 1920; Solapur, Maharashtra
- Died: March 1, 2011 (aged 90)
- Occupations: Sociologist, Jainologist

Vilas Adinath Sangave (2 June 1920 – 1 March 2011) was an Indian sociologist and Jainologist. He was born to a Marathi Jain family in Solapur, Maharashtra. Sangave died at the age of 90.

== Works ==
- Sangave, Vilas Adinath (2001), Facets of Jainology: Selected Research Papers on Jain Society, Religion, and Culture, Popular Prakashan, ISBN 81-7154-839-3
- Sangave, Vilas Adinath (1981), The Sacred Sravana-Belagola (first ed.), Bhartiya Jnanpith
- Sangave, Vilas Adinath (1980) [1959], Jaina Community: A Social Survey (second ed.), Popular Prakashan, ISBN 0317123467
