= Samvara =

One of the seven fundamental elements in Jainism

Samvara (saṃvara) is one of the tattva or the fundamental reality of the world as per the Jain philosophy. It means stoppage—the stoppage of the influx of the material karmas into the soul consciousness. The karmic process in Jainism is based on seven truths or fundamental principles (tattva) of Jainism which explain the human predicament. Out of the seven, the four influxes (āsrava), bondage (bandha), stoppage (saṃvara) and release (nirjarā)—pertain to the karmic process.

== Philosophical overview ==
Saṃvara is the first step in the destruction of accumulated harmful karmas. The world or the samsara is often described as an ocean and the soul as a boat trying to cross it and reach the shores of liberation. The boat is leaking i.e. karmic particles are getting attached to the soul. Hence the first step is to stop the leak and prevent new water from entering the boat. This is saṃvara. Jains assert that emancipation is not possible as long as the soul remains unreleased from the bondage of these karmas. Release is made possible by saṃvara; that is, the stopping of inflow of new karmas, and nirjarā; the shedding of existing harmful karma through conscious efforts.

== Means of saṃvara ==
Samvara or stoppage of karmic influx is achieved through practice of:

1. Three guptis or three controls of mind, speech and body,
2. Five samitis or observing carefulness in movement, speaking, eating, placing objects and disposing refuse.
3. Ten dharmas or observation of good acts like – forgiveness, humility, straightforwardness, contentment, truthfulness, self-control, penance, renunciation, non-attachment and continence.
4. Anuprekshas or meditation on the truths of this universe.
5. Pariṣahajaya, that is, a man on moral path must develop a perfectly patient and unperturbed attitude in the midst of trying and difficult circumstances.
6. Cāritra, that is, endeavour to remain in steady spiritual practices.

== See also ==
- Jainism
- Karma in Jainism
- Causes of Karma
- Tattvarthasutra
