= Champat Rai Jain =

Indian Digambara Jain scholar and writer (1867–1942)

Vidya-Varidhi Champat Rai Jain
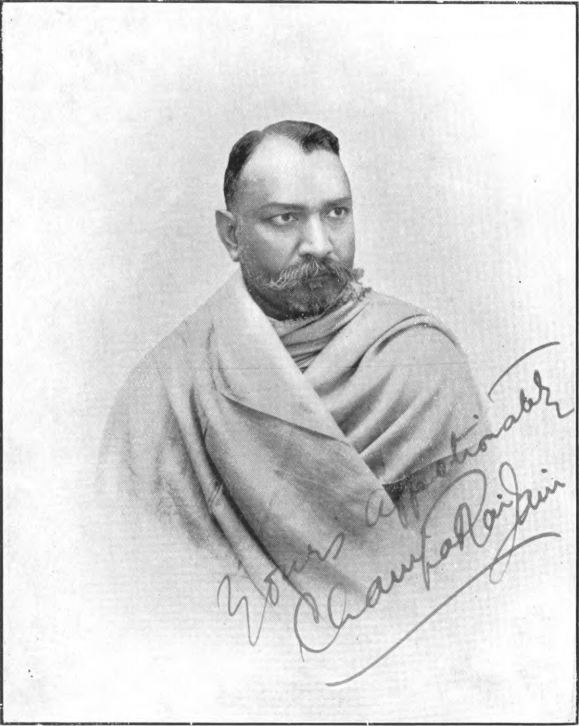
- Born: 6 August 1867; Delhi, India
- Died: 2 June 1942 (aged 74); India
- Occupation: Barrister
- Writing career
- Pen name: C.R. Jain
- Language: English, Hindi, Urdu
- Subjects: Jainism, Comparative religion
- Notable works: "The Key of Knowledge", "The Practical Dharma", "Jainism Christianity and Science"
- Notable awards: Jain Darshan Diwakar

Champat Rai Jain (6 August 1867–2 June 1942) was a Digambara Jain born in Delhi and who studied and practised law in England. He became an influential Jainism scholar and comparative religion writer between 1910s and 1930s who translated and interpreted Digambara texts. In early 1920s, he became religiously active in India and published essays and articles defending Jainism against misrepresentations by colonial era Christian missionaries, contrasting Jainism and Christianity. He founded Akhil Bharatvarsiya Digambara Jain Parisad in 1923 with the aim of activist reforms and uniting the south Indian and north Indian Digambara community. He visited various European countries to give lectures on Jainism. He was conferred with the title Vidya-Varidhi (lit. Ocean of Wisdom) by Bharata Dharma Mahamandal (The India-Religious Association).

== Life ==
Champat Rai Jain was born on 6 August 1867 in Delhi, India. His marriage was fixed at the age of 13. Though it didn’t fructify and he remained a bachelor all his life. In 1892, he went to England to study law, and became a barrister.

Champat Rai Jain was a Digambara, whose writings represent that sect's propaganda with his personal interpretations, according to Robert Williams. Jain became a part of a Digambara group presenting Digambara point of view in the 1920s and 1930s such as with Jagadarlal Jaini, Nathuram Premi, Jugalkishor Mukhtar and Hiralal Jain. Jain was the founder of the Jaina mission in London. He died on 2 June 1942. He was a barrister-at-law, orator, writer, and attempted to explain Jainism with modern age psychology and science terminology.

According to Padmanabh Jaini, the colonial-era Champat Rai Jain was an apologist of Jainism, defended the Jain doctrines that were criticized by Christian missionaries, and authored the first Jaina text aimed at the Christian world when Christian missionaries were extremely frustrated at Jain people they understood to have "no pagan gods" and refused to convert to Christianity. He was among the early 20th-century Jain activists who participated in the colonial discussion about whether Jains are culturally Hindus or a minority community.

He became a part of Digambara activists who sought to energise and reform Digambara community. He participated in several Digambara societies, and founded Akhil Bharatvarsiya Digambara Jain Parisad in 1923 with the aim of activist reforms, reducing caste divisions within Jain society, and uniting the south Indian and north Indian Digambara community.

== Lectures ==
Champat Rai Jain attempted to present Jainism as a scientific religion:

Jainism is a science, and not a code of arbitrary rules and capricious commandments. It does not claim to derive its authority from any non-human source, but is, science-like, founded on the knowledge of those Great Ones who have attained perfection with its aid. Scientific validity can be claimed neither by dogmatism nor mysticism; and it is unnecessary to add that nothing but science and scientific thought can be relied upon to produce immediate, certain and unvarying results.

— Champat Rai Jain, Essays and Addresses

- Jaina Doctrine - Lecture delivered before the "Association des Amis de l'Orient" (Paris) on 28 November 1926
- Jainism And Its Power To Stop Human Warfare- Lecture delivered before "Le Trait d'Union" Society at Nice
- Religion and Comparative Religion- Lecture delivered at Genova, Italy (6 January 1927)
- Ahimsa as the Key to World Peace at the World Fellowship of Faiths (1933)

== Publications ==
Champat Rai Jain wrote in three main languages of his time: English, Hindi, Urdu.

According to Williams, the translations of Champat Rai Jain were of "no high merit", he added his own interpretation often "disfiguring the sense of the original" Jain texts about monastic life and doctrines for Jain laypeople.

- The Key of Knowledge (1915, 1919, 1928)
- The Householder's Dharma (1917): English translation of the Jain text, Ratnakaranda śrāvakācāra.
- The Practical Dharma (1929)- Second edition of "The Practical Path" (1917)
- Confluence of Opposites (1921)
- The Jain Law (1926)
- Nyaya- The Science of Thought (1916, 1924)
- Jainism, Christianity and Science (Allahabad, 1930)
- The Lifting Of The Vell or The Gems Of Islam (1931)
- The Practical Dharma (1929)
- Risabha Deva- The Founder of Jainism (1929, 1935)
- Sannyasa Dharma (1926)
- Sacred Philosophy. 1920.

Essays and Addresses

- What is Jainism (Essays and Addresses- I)
- Jainism and World Problems (Essays and Addresses- II)
- The Change of Heart (Essays and Addresses- III)

=== Hindi ===
- Jain Law
- Sanatana Jain Dharma

=== Urdu ===
- Jawahrat-e-Islam

== Gallery ==
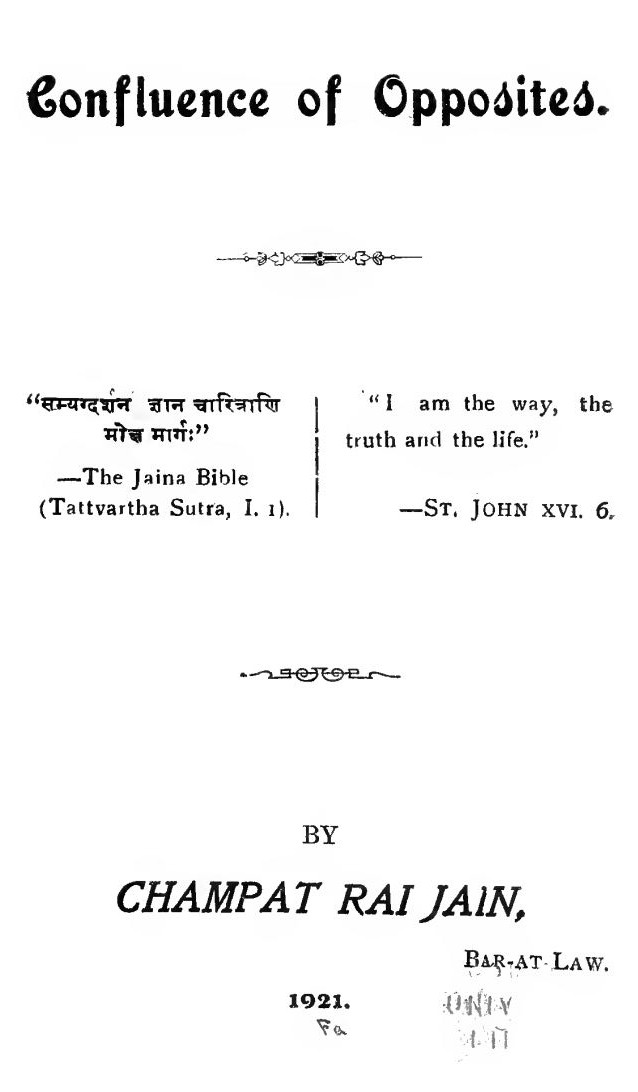
Confluence of opposites (1921) book authored by C.R. Jain

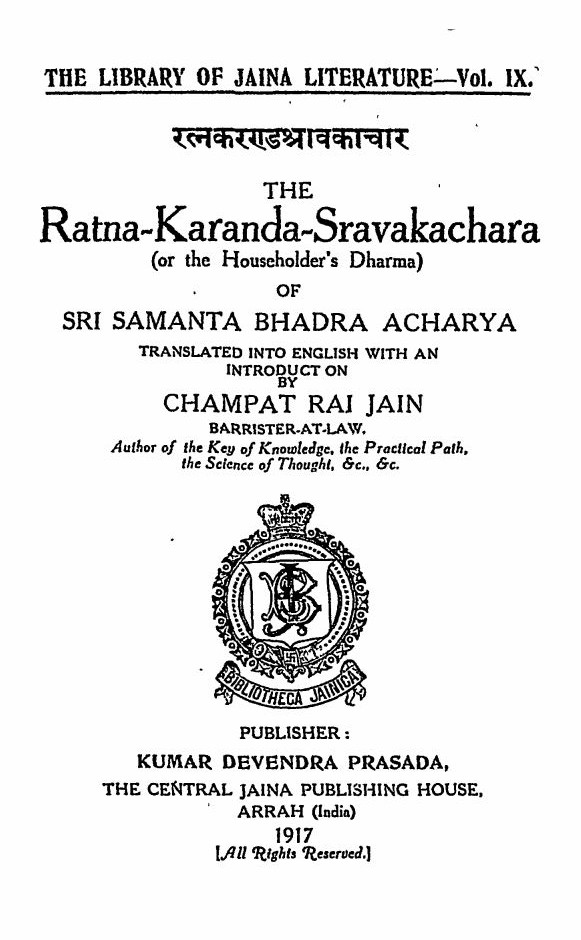
The Householder's Dharma

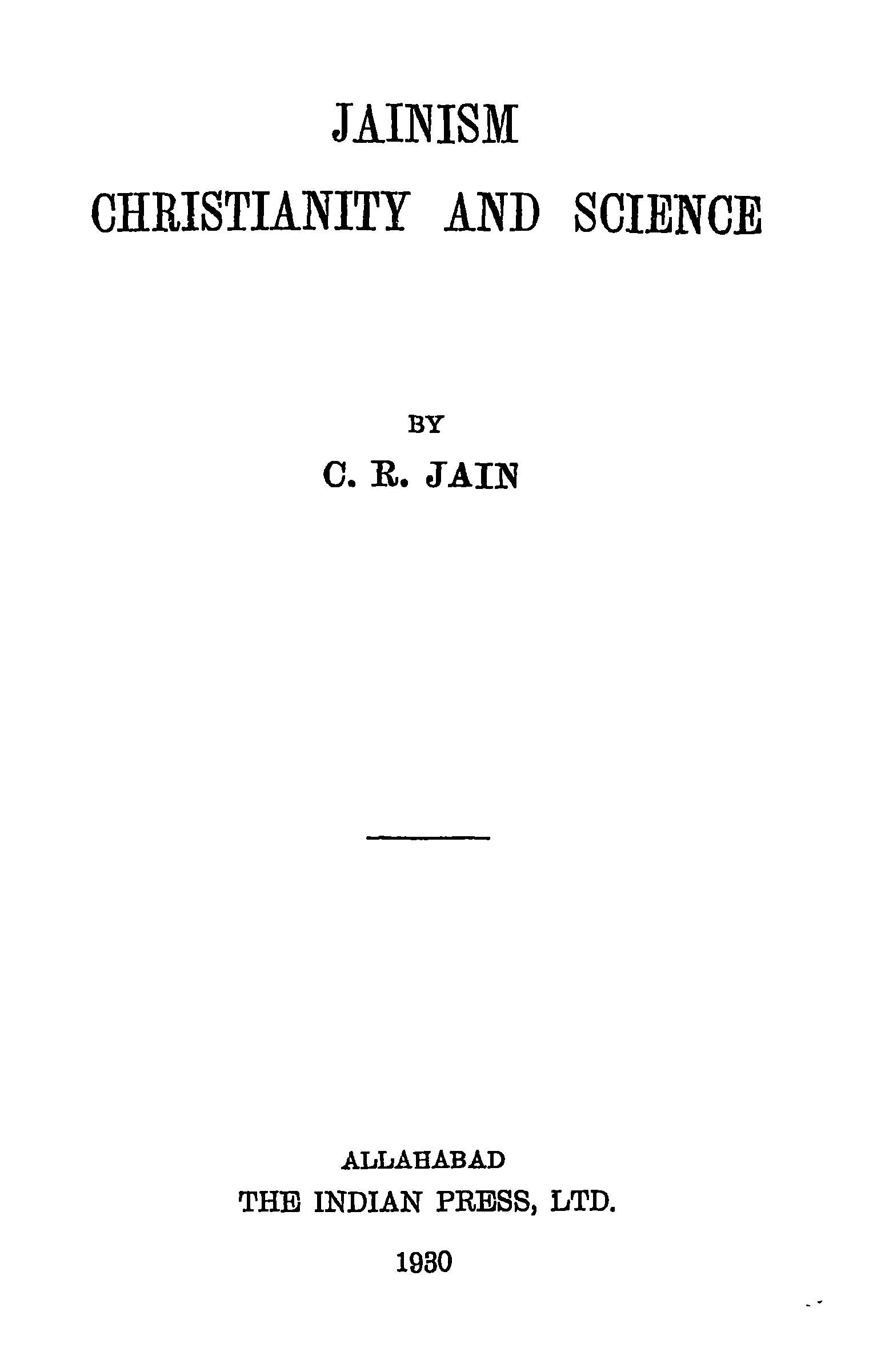
Jainism Christianity and Science (1930)

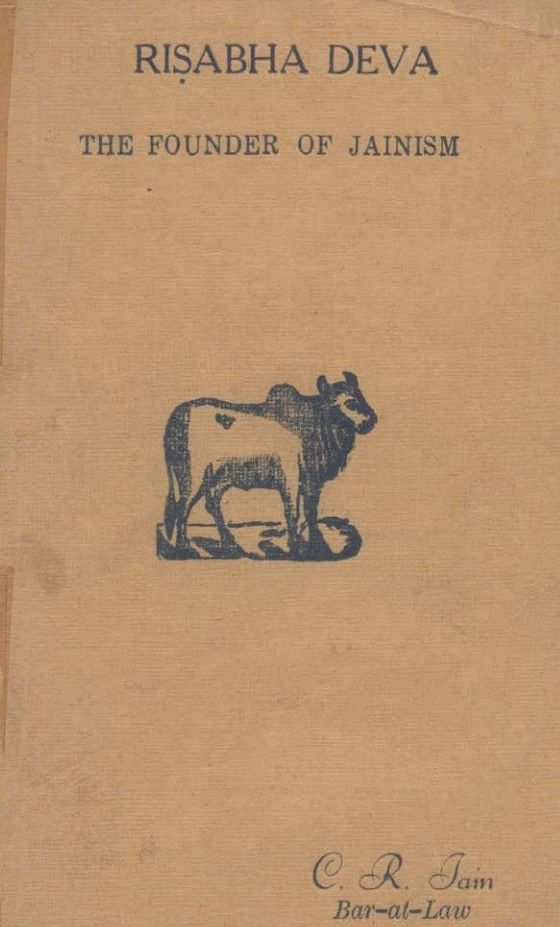
"Risabha Deva-The Founder Of Jainism" book authored by C.R. Jain

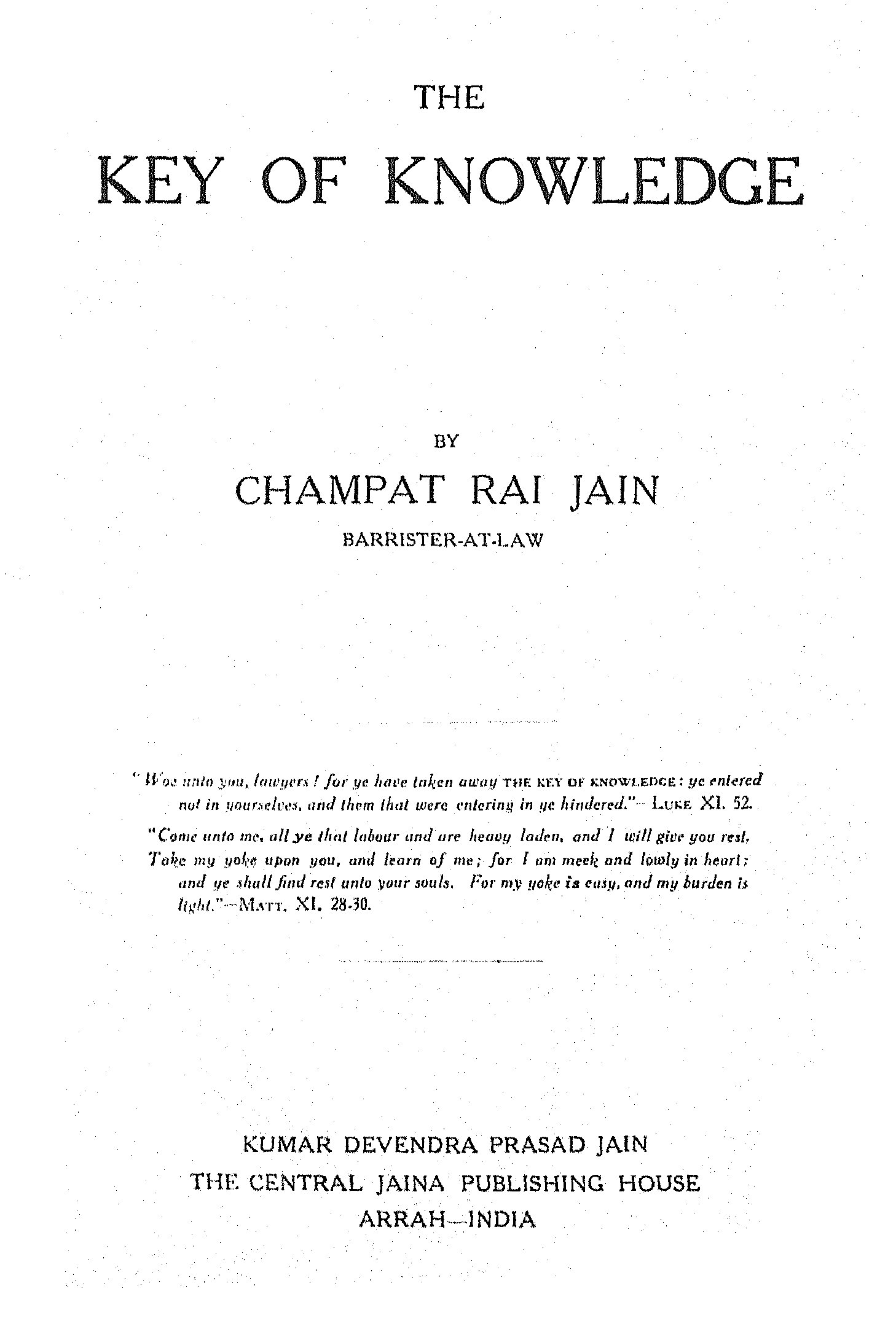
Book cover of "The Key of Knowledge"

"Key of Knowledge", a book authored by Champat Rai Jain, was published in 1915.

== Reception ==
Vijay K. Jain, a modern Jainism scholar in the Preface of his book From IIM-Ahmedabad To Happiness wrote:

Many illuminated works and teachings of great thinkers and sages of the past have repeatedly told us that we need to be able to distinguish between valuable gems and valueless stones, both of which are scattered along our way. One such valuable gem that I could lay my hands on, about a decade ago, was that amazingly comprehensive yet precise treatise The Key of Knowledge, by Champat Rai Jain. The book, first published in 1915, true to its title, has timeless pearls of wisdom in each of its 900-plus pages; one has only to have patience, and develop appreciation and understanding to pick them up. No other work that I know of treats of the great issues that confront humanity with the same simplicity, charm, ease, authority and freedom. As could be expected from a Barrister-at-Law of that era, he was a brilliant grammarian and logician; but more than that, he was a great philosopher.

== See also ==
- Jainism in Europe
- Bal Patil
