= Asrava =

One of the seven fundamental elements in Jainism

Asrava (āsrava "influx") is one of the tattva or the fundamental reality of the world as per the Jain philosophy. It refers to the influence of body and mind causing the soul to generate karma.

The karmic process in Jainism is based on seven truths or fundamental principles (tattva) of Jainism which explain the human predicament. Out that the seven, the four—influx (āsrava), bondage (bandha), stoppage (saṃvara) and release (nirjarā)—pertain to the karmic process.

== Overview ==
The āsrava, that is, the influx of karmic occurs when the karmic particles are attracted to the soul on account of vibrations created by activities of mind, speech and body. According to the Jain text, Tattvartha sutra, translates S.A. Jain:

yoga (activity) i.e. the action of the body, the organ of speech and the mind is the reason for asrava.

— Tattvārthasūtra (6:1–2)

The karmic inflow on account of yoga driven by passions and emotions cause a long-term inflow of karma prolonging the cycle of reincarnations. On the other hand, the karmic inflows on account of actions that are not driven by passions and emotions have only a transient, short-lived karmic effect.

According to Jains, āsrava refers to the influx of very fine matter particles. Champat Rai Jain in his book, The Key of Knowledge writes:

To begin with āsrava, the first thing to grasp is that there can be no bondage of pure mental abstractions, or purely wordy concepts; the word signifies some kind of real fetters, not, indeed, consisting in chains of iron, but of some very subtle and fine kind of matter. It is well to know that nothing but force, in some form or other, is capable of exercising restraint or of holding living beings in the condition of captivity, and that no kind of force is conceivable apart from a substance of some kind or other. The bondage of soul must, therefore, be the bondage of matter, the only substance which is known to enter into interaction with souls, and the obtainment of freedom must consequently imply the removal of the particles of this foreign material from the constitution of the ego.

— Champat Rai Jain

== Classification ==
There are two kinds of influx, namely:

1. that of persons with passions, which extends transmigration, and
2. that of persons free from passions, which prevents or shortens transmigration

== See also ==
- Asava
- Karma in Jainism
- Causes of Karma
