= Jain philosophy =

Indian philosophical tradition within Jainism

Jain philosophy or Jaina philosophy refers to the ancient Indian philosophical system of the Jain religion. It comprises all the philosophical investigations and systems of inquiry that developed among the early branches of Jainism in ancient India following the nirvana of the 24th Tirthankar, Mahāvīra (c. 6th century BCE). One of the main features of Jain philosophy is its dualistic metaphysics, which holds that there are two distinct categories of existence: the living, conscious, or sentient entities (jīva) and the non-living or material entities (ajīva).

Jain texts discuss numerous philosophical topics such as cosmology, epistemology, ethics, metaphysics, ontology, the philosophy of time, and soteriology. Jain thought is primarily concerned with understanding the nature of living beings, how these beings are bound by the processes of karma (which are seen as fine material particles) and how living beings may be liberated (moksha) from the cycle of death and rebirth (saṃsāra). A peculiarity of Jainism is to essentially associate several renunciatory liberating practices with the imperative of non-violence (ahiṃsā). Jainism and its philosophical system are also notable for the belief in a beginning-less and cyclical universe, which posits a non-theistic understanding of the world and the complete rejection of a hypothetical creator deity. Jain philosophy is also noted for its "realist epistemology" of anekāntavāda ("many-sidedness"), a rejection of all simplistic and one-sided views of truth and reality.

From the Jain point of view, Jain philosophy is eternal and has been taught numerous times in the remote past by the great enlightened tirthankaras ("ford-makers"). Historians trace the developments of Jain thought to a few key historically verifiable figures in ancient India, Parshvanatha (c. 9th or 8th century BCE) and Mahāvīra (c. 6th century BCE, older contemporary of Gautama Buddha). According to Paul Dundas, Jain metaphysical doctrine has remained relatively stable throughout its long history and no major radical doctrinal shift has taken place at least since the 4th or 5th century CE. This is mainly because of the influence of Umaswati's Tattvārthasūtra, which has remained the central authoritative philosophical text among all Jains.

== Knowledge ==
According to Ācārya Pujyapada's Sarvārthasiddhi, the ultimate good for a living being (jīva) is liberation from the cyclical world of reincarnation (saṃsāra). The attainment of liberation is also associated with omniscience, and it is believed that past Jain sages like Mahavira have achieved omniscience.

According to the Tattvārthasūtra, the means to achieve liberation is threefold (this is known as the three jewels):

Right vision, right knowledge, and right conduct (together) constitute the path to liberation.

— Tattvārthasūtra (1–1)

According to the Sarvārthasiddhi,

- Right Vision (Samyak Darśana) is defined as "seeing based on true knowledge of the tattvas (substances, realities). A person with Samyak Darshan always identifies himself as a pure soul, separate from body" Right Vision is attained by right knowledge.
- Right Knowledge (Samyak Jnāna) is defined as "knowing the tattvas such as the jīvas (living beings) as they truly are (artha)."

Jains believe that sentient beings can achieve perfect and complete knowledge of all things (omniscience). Those who have such knowledge are the enlightened kevalins. These are souls who have detached from all things, and are therefore able to perceive all things directly since their soul's knowledge is no longer blocked by anything. For most beings, the omniscience of their soul is blocked by the karmic particles stuck to their soul, like a thick cloud blocks out the light of the sun. Therefore, the only source of omniscient knowledge for lesser beings is the teachings of the kevalins. Since there are no longer any living kevalins, the Jain scriptures are the only source of such knowledge and are thus seen as the highest authority in Jain philosophy. Because of this, Jain philosophy considers the doctrines found in the scriptures as absolute truths and philosophy's role is mainly to summarize, explain and supplement these doctrines.

=== Ontology ===
Jain philosophy postulates at least seven "tattvas" (truths, realities or fundamental principles):

1. Jīva – The living being, or self, which is said to have a separate existence from its body, and experiences pleasure and pain. The selves are characterized by unlimited consciousness, knowledge, bliss and energy. Though they experience birth and death, they are neither destroyed nor created. Decay and origin refer respectively to the disappearing of one state of soul and appearance of another state, these being merely modifications of the jīva. There are a fixed number of selves. They are either inherently unfit for liberation or inherently fit for liberation, and no action can change their status.
2. Ajīva – refers to any material substance and principle that organizes it. There are five ontological categories of insentients: non-sentient substance or matter (pudgala), principle of motion (dharma), the principle of rest (adharma), space (ākāśa) and time (kāla). Along with jīvas, these form a set of six ontological substances (dravya). Substances are simple and indestructible elements which come together into impermanent bodies or objects.
3. Āsrava (influx) – the process by which good and bad karmic substances flow into the living being
4. Bandha (bondage) – mutual intermingling of the living being and the karmas, thereby causing its change, which cumulatively determines future rebirths
5. Samvara – the stoppage of the inflow of karmic matter into the soul
6. Nirjara (gradual dissociation) – separation or falling off of part of karmic matter from the soul.
7. Mokṣha (liberation) – complete annihilation of all karmic matter (bound with any particular soul). Liberation is attained by understanding reality and its categories (tattva) as they are.

Śvētāmbara Jains also often add two more realities to the above list: good karma (punya, merits) and bad karma (papa, negatives).

Each entity can be analyzed in numerous different ways according to Jain thinkers. Umasvati outlines numerous "gateways" of investigation called nikshepas. These are: nāma (name), sthāpanā (symbol), dravya (potentiality), bhāvatā (actuality), nirdeśa (definition), svāmitva (possession), sādhana (cause), adhikarana (location), sthiti (duration), vidhānatā (variety), sat (existence), samkhyā (numerical determination), ksetra (field occupied), sparśana (field touched), kāla (continuity ), antara (time-lapse), bhāva (states), andalpabahutva (relative size).

According to Harry Oldmeadow, Jain ontology is both realist and dualist. Jeffery D. Long also affirms the realistic nature of Jain metaphysics, which is a kind of pluralism that asserts the existence of various realities.

The major metaphysical distinction, writes Helmuth von Glasenapp, is between the animate or sentient substances (jīva) and the inanimate substances (ajīva).

Helmuth von Glasenapp pointed out that a central principle of Jain thought is its attempt to provide an ontology that includes both permanence and change. As such, every being contains something that is lasting and something which is inconstant. For example, in a pot, its material atoms are imperishable, but the form, color and other qualities are subject to change.

=== Epistemology ===
Jain philosophy accepts three reliable means of knowledge (pramana). (Note: According to Vijay K. Jain, Jain texts mention that knowledge is of five kinds – sensory knowledge, scriptural knowledge, clairvoyance, telepathy, and omniscience. Out of these, sensory knowledge, scriptural knowledge and clairvoyance may also be erroneous knowledge.) It holds that correct knowledge is based on perception (pratyaksa), inference (anumana) and testimony (sabda or the word of scriptures). These ideas are elaborated in Jain texts such as Tattvarthasūtra, Parvacanasara, Nandi and Anuyogadvarini. Some Jain texts add analogy (upamana) as the fourth reliable means, in a manner similar to epistemological theories found in other Indian religions.

In Jainism, jñāna (knowledge) is said to be of five kinds – Kevala jñāna (Omniscience), Śrutu jñāna (Scriptural Knowledge), mati jñāna (Sensory Knowledge), avadhi jñāna (Clairvoyance), and manah prayāya jñāna (Telepathy). The first two are described as being indirect means of knowledge (parokṣa), with the others furnishing direct knowledge (pratyakṣa), by which it is meant that the object is known directly by the soul.

=== Relativity and Pluralism ===
Jain epistemology includes three related doctrines which deal with the complex and manifold nature of knowledge: anekāntavāda (the theory of many-sidedness), syādvāda (the theory of conditioned predication) and nayavāda (the theory of partial standpoints). Long calls these three the "Jain doctrines of relativity".

==== Anekāntavāda ====
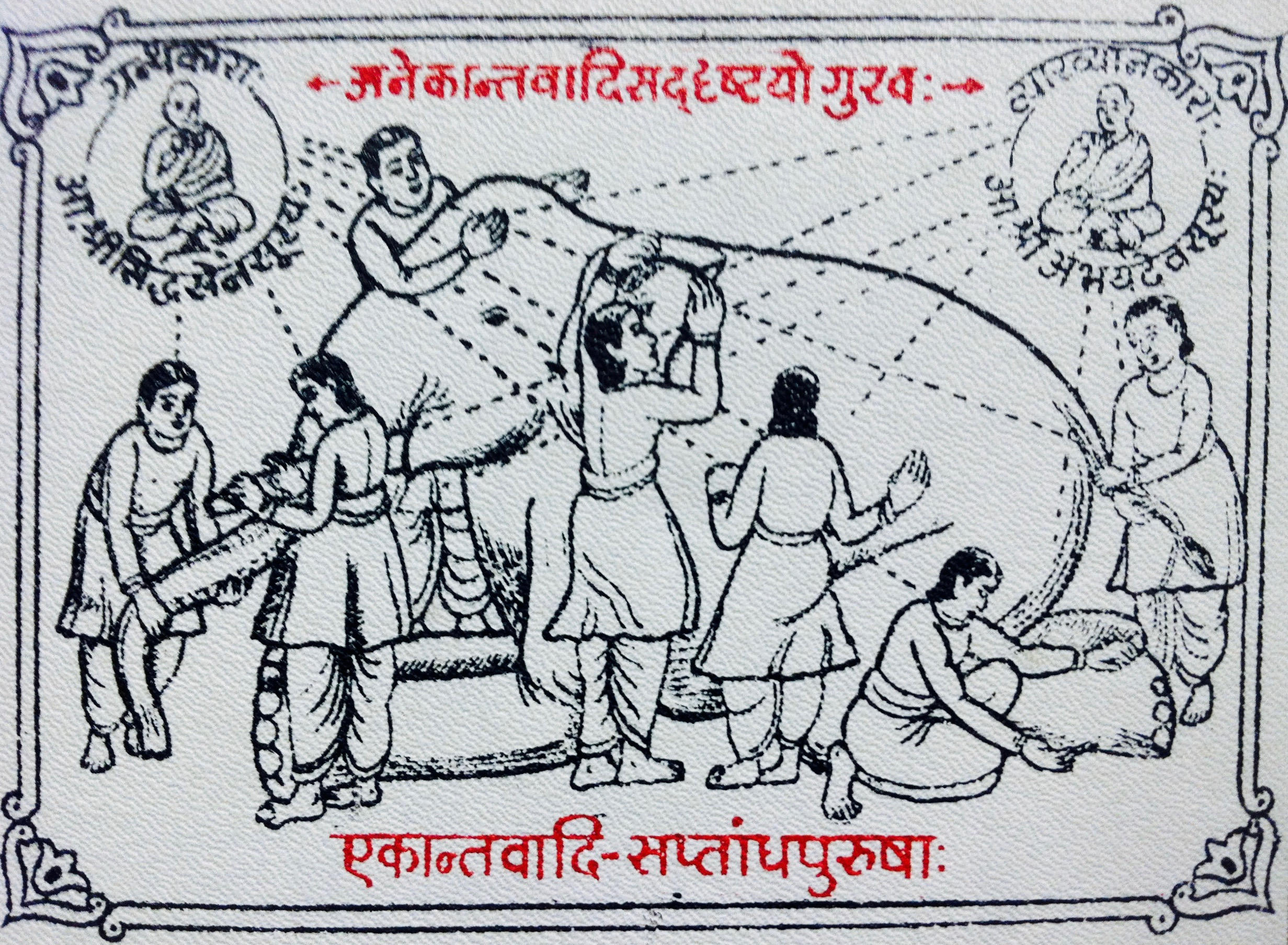
A Jain illustration of the blind men and an elephant parable. At the top, the Kevalins are shown having the ability to view all perspectives.

One of the most important doctrines of Jainism is anēkāntavāda (literally the 'non-one-sided' view). It refers to a kind of ontological pluralism and to the idea that reality is complex and multi-faceted and therefore can only be understood from a multiplicity of perspectives. As Long notes, this is ultimately an ontological doctrine that holds that "all existent entities have infinite attributes." Jain thought generally affirms the reality of all of our perceptions, even those which contradict each other such as continuity and change, arising and perishing.

This doctrine is often illustrated through the parable of the "blind men and an elephant". In this story, each blind man felt a different part of an elephant and then claimed to understand the true appearance of the elephant, but could only partly succeed. This principle is based on the idea that objects are infinite in their qualities and modes of existence. Because of this, they cannot be completely grasped in all aspects and manifestations by finite human perception. According to the Jains, only the Kevalis—omniscient beings—can comprehend objects in all aspects and manifestations.

Indeed, the Jain texts depict Mahavira as answering certain metaphysical questions that were considered 'unanswerable' by the Buddha. Mahavira is depicted as answering these with both a qualified "yes" and a "no", depending on the perspective of the questioner. Thus, the soul is both eternal in its intrinsic nature and yet also changing (due to the karmas affecting it and the various states that arise and pass away within it) and the universe is both eternal (beginningless) and yet also non-eternal (since it goes through cycles). Thus, the Jains saw their metaphysics as a middle path, embracing both permanence and impermanence as metaphysically fundamental, against that of the Buddhists (who defended impermanence) and the Brahmins (who generally held a doctrine of permanence).

Anekāntavāda encourages its adherents to consider the views and beliefs of their rivals and opposing parties. Proponents of anekāntavāda apply this principle to religion and philosophy, reminding themselves that any religion or philosophy—even Jainism—which clings too dogmatically to its own tenets, is committing an error based on its limited point of view. The principle of anekāntavāda also influenced Mohandas Karamchand Gandhi to adopt principles of religious tolerance, ahiṃsā and satyagraha.

==== Nayavāda ====
A closely related theory is Nayavāda, which means "the theory of partial standpoints or viewpoints." Nayas are partially valid, philosophical perspectives from which anything can be seen. An object has infinite aspects to it, but when we describe an object in practice, we speak of only relevant aspects and ignore irrelevant ones. Jain philosophers use the theory of partial viewpoints in order to explain the complexity of reality, part by part.

This is how Jains can describe objects with seemingly contradictory statements (the soul is both permanent and impermanent etc.). Since it is only from certain perspectives that each statement is made, there is no contradiction. Nayavāda holds that all philosophical disputes arise out of confusion of standpoints, and the standpoints we adopt are, although we may not realise it, "the outcome of purposes that we may pursue".

According to Long, Umāsvāti lists seven partial viewpoints:

naigamanaya (common view), samgrahanaya (generic view), vyavahāranaya (pragmatic view), rjusūtranaya (linear view), śabdanaya (verbal view), samabhirūdha naya (etymological view), andevambhūtanaya (actuality view). The common view is how an entity is generally perceived– what one might call a 'common sense' or unrefined perspective. A generic view seeks to classify the entity. A pragmatic view assesses the entity in terms of its possible uses. A linear view looks at the entity as it is in the present moment. A verbal view seeks to name the entity. An etymological view uses this name and its relations with other words to discern its nature. And an actuality view is concerned with the concrete particulars of the entity.

Jain thinkers also use the doctrine of standpoints in order to provide a doxography of non-Jain philosophical systems. According to Jain philosophers, other philosophical systems rely on only one of the seven standpoints, while excluding the others. This is explains why they have reached false conclusions. For example, Nyaya-Vaisesika is often associated with the first naya (the common view), Vedanta with the second naya (generic view), Materialism with the third naya (pragmatic view) and Buddhism with the fourth (the linear view). Meanwhile, Jainism is seen as the only philosophy able to combine all seven nayas.

One influential theory of Nayavāda is the dual-perspective model of Kundakunda. Kundakunda held that the perspective of the soul is the only 'certain' (niscaya), 'supreme' (paramārtha) or 'pure' (suddha) perspective. Because of the adherence of karmic particles, the soul loses knowledge of itself as being pure, however, it is never truly modified. All other things in the universe are worldly and are to be viewed as having merely transactional and provisional value.

As such, the worldly perspective is ultimately false, while the supreme perspective is the ultimate truth and according to Long, corresponds to the kevalajñāna of a Jina. Kundakunda's philosophy is especially influential in Digambara thought, though it has also influenced some Śvetāmbara scholars. However, other Śvetāmbara thinkers like Yashovijaya famously criticized Kundakunda for his reliance on one single standpoint, i.e. for ekāntavāda (absolutism).

Another influential theory of nayas was that of Siddhasena Divākara, who in his Sanmatitarka ('The Logic of the True Doctrine), divided the traditional nayas into two main categories: those which affirm the substantiality of existence (dravyāstikanayas) and those which affirm impermanence (paryāyāstikanayas). Siddhasena also identified the various nayas with the different Indian philosophies, all of which are seen as one-sided and extreme views, while the Jain view is seen as being in the middle and as embracing all the various points of views, which, while seemingly contradictory, are just partial perspectives of the whole truth.

==== Syādvāda ====
Syādvāda is the theory of conditioned predication, which provides an expression to anekānta by recommending that the indeclinable "syād" or "syāt" ("in a certain sense") be prefixed to every phrase or expression. In the context of Jain thought, syād (often paired with eva, "surely" or "certainly") means "in some specific sense, or from some specific perspective, it is certainly the case that...". As reality is complex, no single proposition can express the nature of reality fully. Thus the term "syād" should be prefixed before each proposition giving it a conditional point of view and thus removing any dogmatism in the statement as well as indicating that the sentence is true only from a specific point of view.

Since it ensures that each statement is expressed from seven different conditional and relative viewpoints or propositions, syādvāda is known as saptibhaṅgīnāya or the theory of seven conditioned predications. These seven propositions, also known as saptibhaṅgī, are:

1. syād-asti—from a certain perspective, it is,
2. syād-nāsti—from a certain perspective, it is not,
3. syād-asti-nāsti—from a certain perspective, it is, and it is not,
4. syād-asti-avaktavyaḥ—from a certain perspective, it is, and it is indescribable,
5. syād-nāsti-avaktavyaḥ—from a certain perspective, it is not, and it is indescribable,
6. syād-asti-nāsti-avaktavyaḥ—from a certain perspective, it is, it is not, and it is indescribable,
7. syād-avaktavyaḥ—from a certain perspective, it is indescribable.

Each of these seven propositions examines the complex and multifaceted nature of reality from a relative point of view of time, space, substance and mode. To ignore the complexity of reality is to commit the fallacy of dogmatism. According to Long, this sevenfold analysis is seen by Jain philosophers as being universally applicable and "to be exhaustive of the possible truth-values that a given proposition can convey."

However, as Long notes, there is a limitation to the theories of relativity applied by Jain philosophers. This limitation is the idea that the conclusions of the doctrines of relativity must be consistent with the Jain worldview. This is summarized by Siddhasena as follows: "A well presented view of the form of naya only lends support to the Āgamic doctrines while the same, if ill presented, destroys both (i.e. itself as well as its rival)." Thus, the relativity doctrines are seen by Jains as being limited by the normative claims of the Jain tradition, since these are seen as being founded on the omniscient perspective of the enlightened ones.

== Jīvas, the Living ==
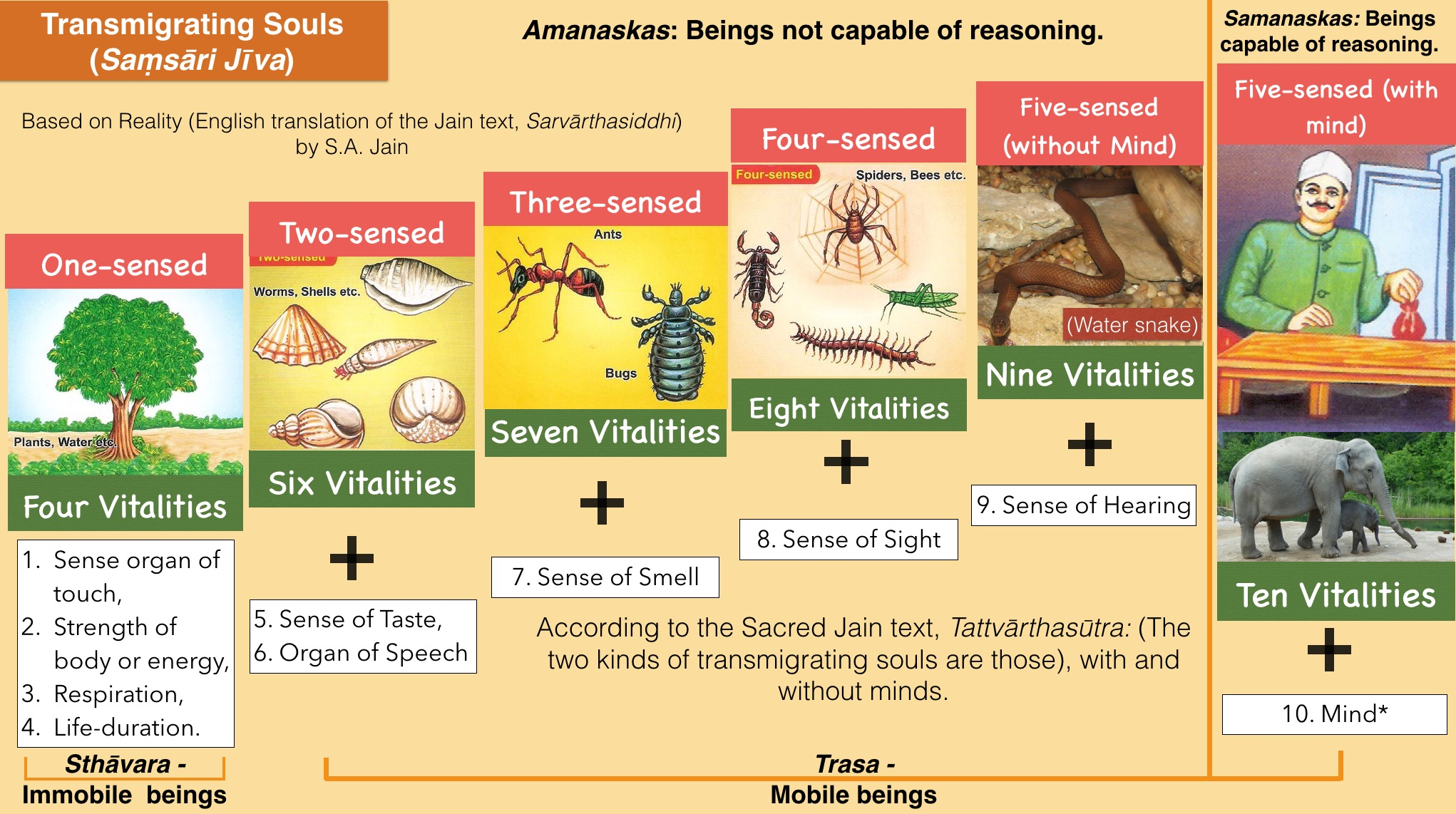
Classification of Saṃsāri Jīvas (transmigrating souls) in Jainism

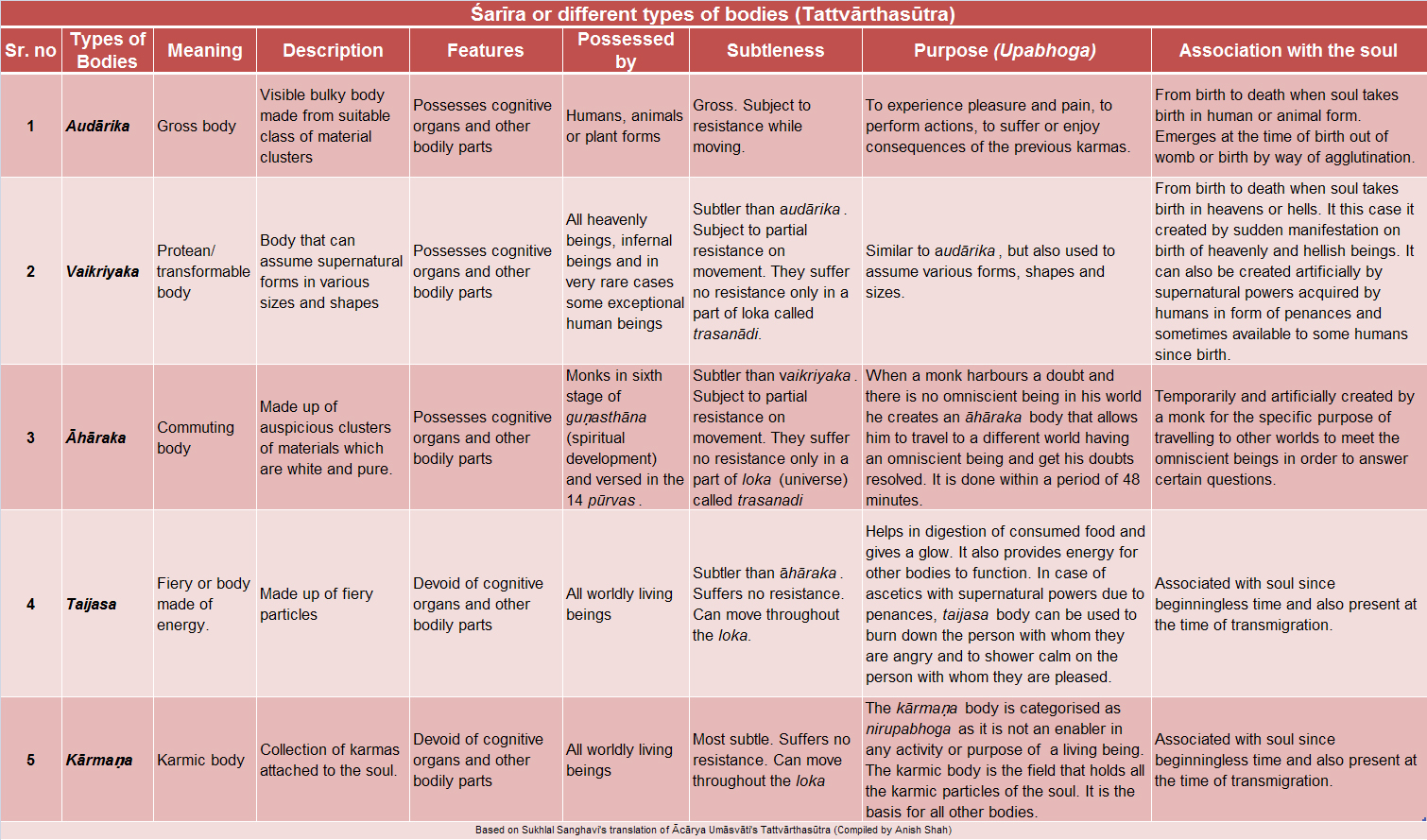
An explanation of the five types of material bodies associated with a Jiva.

The universe is composed of two main kinds of substances, the jīva (living) and the ajīva (non-living). These are un-created existents which are always interacting with each other. These substances behave according to natural laws and the intrinsic nature (sahāvō) of a substance. Understanding this intrinsic nature is the true nature of the Jain dharma.

Jīvas are categorised into two types—liberated and non-liberated. A jīva has various essential qualities: knowledge, consciousness (caitanya), bliss (sukha) and vibrational energy (virya). These qualities are fully enjoyed unhindered by liberated souls, but obscured by karma in the case of non-liberated souls resulting in karmic bondage. This bondage further results in a continuous co-habitation of the soul with the body. Thus, an embodied non-liberated soul is found in four realms of existence—heavens, hells, humans and animal world – in a continuous cycle of births and deaths also known as samsāra. According to Jain thinkers, all living beings (even gods) experience extensive suffering and unquenchable desire (while worldly happiness is fleeting and small in comparison, like a mustard seed next to a mountain). With the exception of the enlightened ones, all living beings are all subject to death and rebirth.

A soul is clothed in various material bodies, of which there are five, each one finer than the other (see image on the right). Every being has at least two bodies, the fiery body and the karmic body. These two bodies do not feel pain or pleasure and can pass through solid matter. A being can have two more other bodies apart from these basic ones, and only the earthly body can be perceived by the eyes. Jains believe that a soul with higher powers can partially leave the body, act outside of it and then return later. This is called samudghāta.

According to the Jain philosophy, there are an infinite number of independent jīvas (sentients, living beings, souls) which fill the entire universe. The jīvas are divided into various categories, these include the stationary beings like trees and the beings that move. Jains developed a hierarchy of living beings, depending on the various senses (indriyas) and vital aspects (pranas) that they have. Animals are classed as five sensed being, while plants and various microorganism have one sense. The vitalities or life-principles are ten, namely the five senses, energy, respiration, life-duration, the organ of speech, and the mind. Humans, gods and so on are five sensed beings that also have an inner sense or thinking mind (manas). Regarding sex, the Jains believed that there were three main sexes: male, female and the third sex (napumsaka-veda, all beings without sex organs are part of this third sex). The Jains also affirmed the existence of tiny one-sensed beings called nigodas which exists everywhere and fill the universe.

A unique Jain view is that plants have a form of consciousness like other animals. This is supposed to be seen in their desire for nourishment, reproduction, and self-preservation. They are even seen as capable of expressing moral feelings and thus eventually climbing the ladder of beings towards liberation.

== Cosmology ==
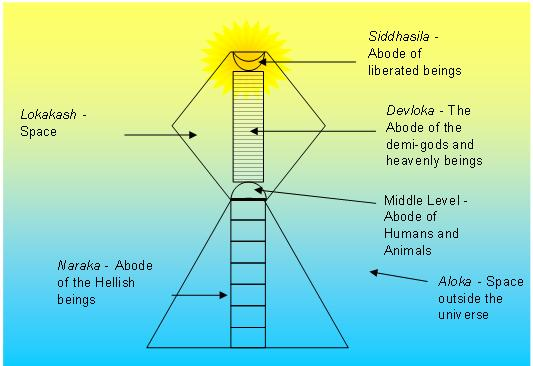
Structure of Universe according to the Jain scriptures.

Our world according to Jain cosmology is a massive structure, wide at the bottom, narrow in the middle and broad in its upper regions. It contains various realms or sub-worlds, including the siddhaloka (world of the enlightened ones), the heavens, various hells, and the human realm (at the center of the universe), which is a system of island continents (including Jambudvipa at the center) divided by mountains and surrounded by oceans with a giant mountain at the very center (Mt. Meru).

Jain cosmology denies the existence of a supreme being responsible for creation and operation of the universe. In Jainism, this universe is an uncreated entity, existing since infinity, immutable in nature, beginningless and endless. It has no creator, governor, judge, or destroyer.

Jain philosophers constantly attacked the doctrine of creationism. In his Mahāpurāṇa, Ācārya Jinasena critiqued the concept of a creator god:

Some foolish men declare that the creator made the world. The doctrine that the world was created is ill advised and should be rejected. If god created the world, where was he before the creation? If you say he was transcendent then and needed no support, where is he now? How could god have made this world without any raw material? If you say that he made this first, and then the world, you are faced with an endless regression.

Jainism does uphold the existence of heavenly and hell beings who die and are reborn according to their karma. Gods are believed to possess a more transcendent knowledge about material things and can anticipate events in the human realms. However, once their past karmic merit is exhausted, gods die and are reborn again as humans, animals or other beings.

Souls are also believed to be able to achieve total perfection, a state commonly called paramātman, the "supreme self" (also commonly referred to as "God" in English as well). In Jainism, perfect souls with a body are called arihant (victors) and perfect souls without a body are also called siddhas (liberated souls).

=== Time Cycles ===
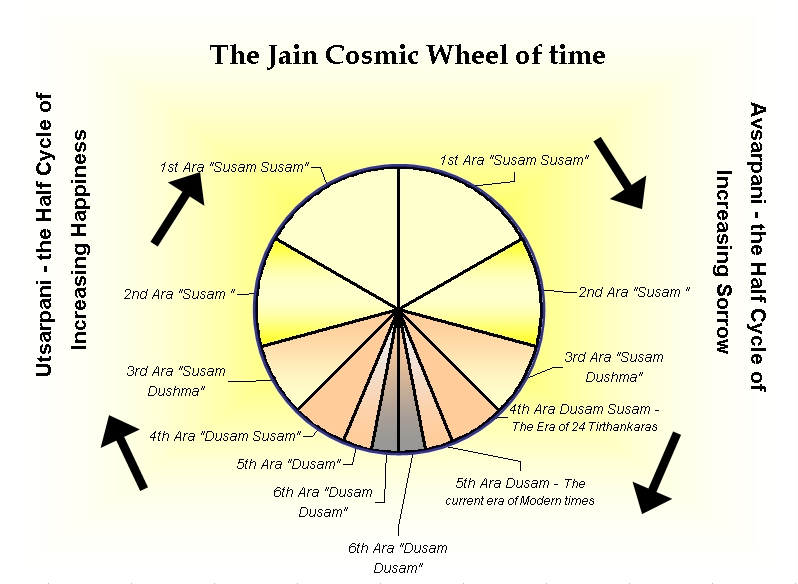
Division of time as envisaged by Jains.

According to Jainism, time is without beginning and eternal. The kālacakra, the cosmic wheel of time, rotates ceaselessly. The wheel of time is divided into two half-cycles, utsarpiṇī (ascending, a time of progressive prosperity and happiness) and avasarpiṇī (descending, a time of increasing sorrow and immorality).

Each half cycle is further sub-divided into six aras or epochs. As the universe moves through these epochs, worlds go through changes in happiness, life span, and general moral conduct. No divine or supernatural beings are responsible for these changes, rather they happen due to the force of karma. Jains believe that the time cycle is currently in the descending phase.

During the each motion of the half-cycle of the wheel of time, 63 Śalākāpuruṣa or 63 illustrious persons, consisting of the 24 Tīrthaṅkaras and their contemporaries regularly appear.

== The Non-Living Reality ==
The five unconscious (ajīva) substances (dravya) are:

=== Pudgala ===
Pudgala is a term for any non-living particulate matter. The Jains developed an elaborate theory of atomism. Paramāņus or atoms were the basic and building blocks of matter. They cannot be perceived by the senses and cannot be further divided. An atom also always possesses four qualities, a color (varna), a taste (rasa), a smell (gandha), and a certain kind of palpability (sparsha, touch) such as lightness, heaviness, softness, roughness, etc. Atoms do not, however, need to be material in nature because selves are understood as a kind of atom.

An atom occupies one space point. It is uncreated and indestructible. Atoms combine (bandha) change their modes, and disintegrate (bheda) but their basic qualities remain. An atom can also be bound together with other atoms to create an aggregate (skandha). Material aggregates are categorized according to how fine (suksma) or coarse (sthula) they are. The finest kind of material aggregate is on the atomic scale (extra fine matter), then comes "fine" matter (includes karmic particles), then anything that can be sensed in some way (like smell) but not seen, then comes matter which can be seen but not touched (like light), then there is the category of coarse things (which includes any fluids) and finally there is extra coarse matter (solids). Material things can give off light or darkness. Darkness is seen as a kind of matter in Jainism and so is sound.

=== Motion/Rest ===
Dharma (Medium of Motion) and Adharma (Medium of Rest) are substances which account for the principles of motion and rest. As such, they are a kind of aether. Also known as Dharmāstikāya and Adharmāstikāya, they are said to pervade the entire universe. Dharma and Adharma are not motion or rest themselves, but mediate motion and rest in other bodies. Without the medium of motion, motion itself is not possible and vice versa. It is a precondition for movement/rest, like the water which allows for fish to swim. This doctrine is unique to Jainism.

=== Space ===
Ākāśa (Space) is a substance that accommodates souls, matter, the principle of motion, the principle of rest, and time. It is an all-pervading receptable made up of infinite space-points (pradesha). According to Jains, Space is a substance, in the nature of a vacuum but not a pure vacuum.

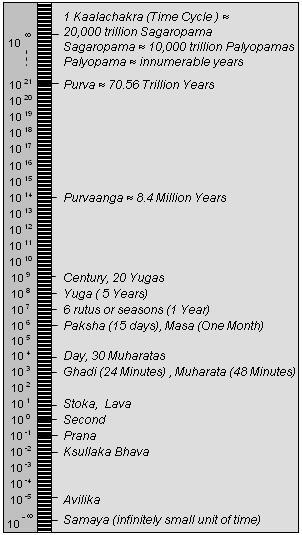
Scale of time in Jain texts shown logarithmically.

It is an extended continuous vacuum. As pure vacuum it will be non-existent, and non-extended; which will devoid it of even one positive quality. Therefore, Jains propound that Space, which is endowed with infinite extension is a substance in itself.

=== Time ===
In Jainism, time (Kāla) is that which mediates change, it causes what is new to become old, and so on. For Jains, time is that which supports the changes to which substances are subject. From one point of view, it is an infinite and endless continuity, from another standpoint, it is made up an infinite number of atomic moments (samaya). Some Jain philosophers hold that time is a substance, while others do not.

According to Champat Rai Jain, "Nothing in nature can exist destitute or devoid of function. Function is discharged by the displacement of energy in the case of simple units and things. If there were no Time-substance to help in the performance of the movement of the displacement of energy, things would be doomed to remain in the same condition always."

== Karma and Rebirth ==
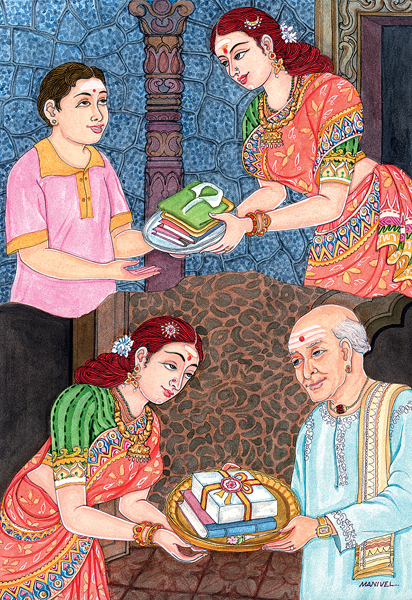
Karma as action and reaction: if we sow goodness, we will reap goodness.

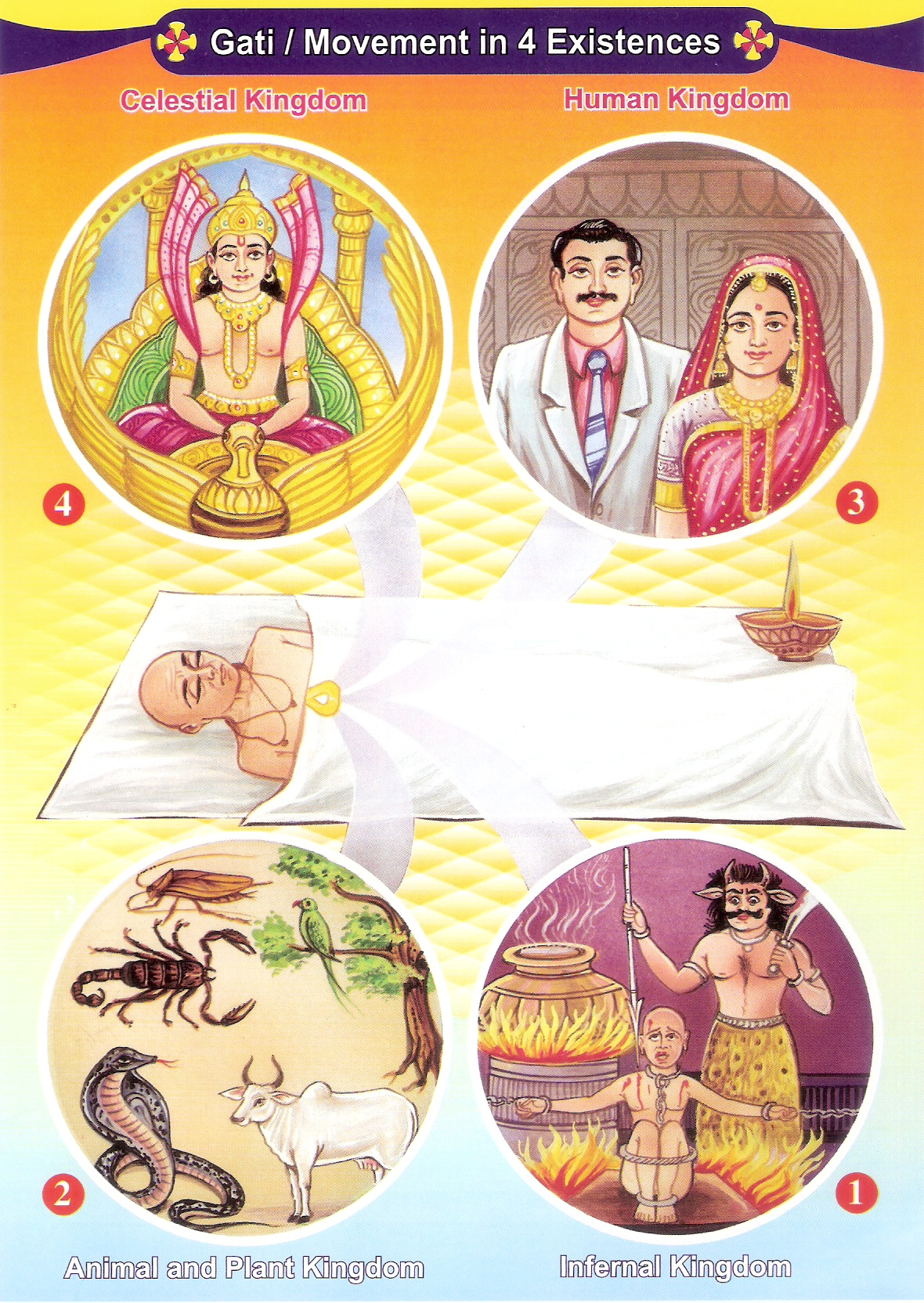
The various realms of existence in Jainism

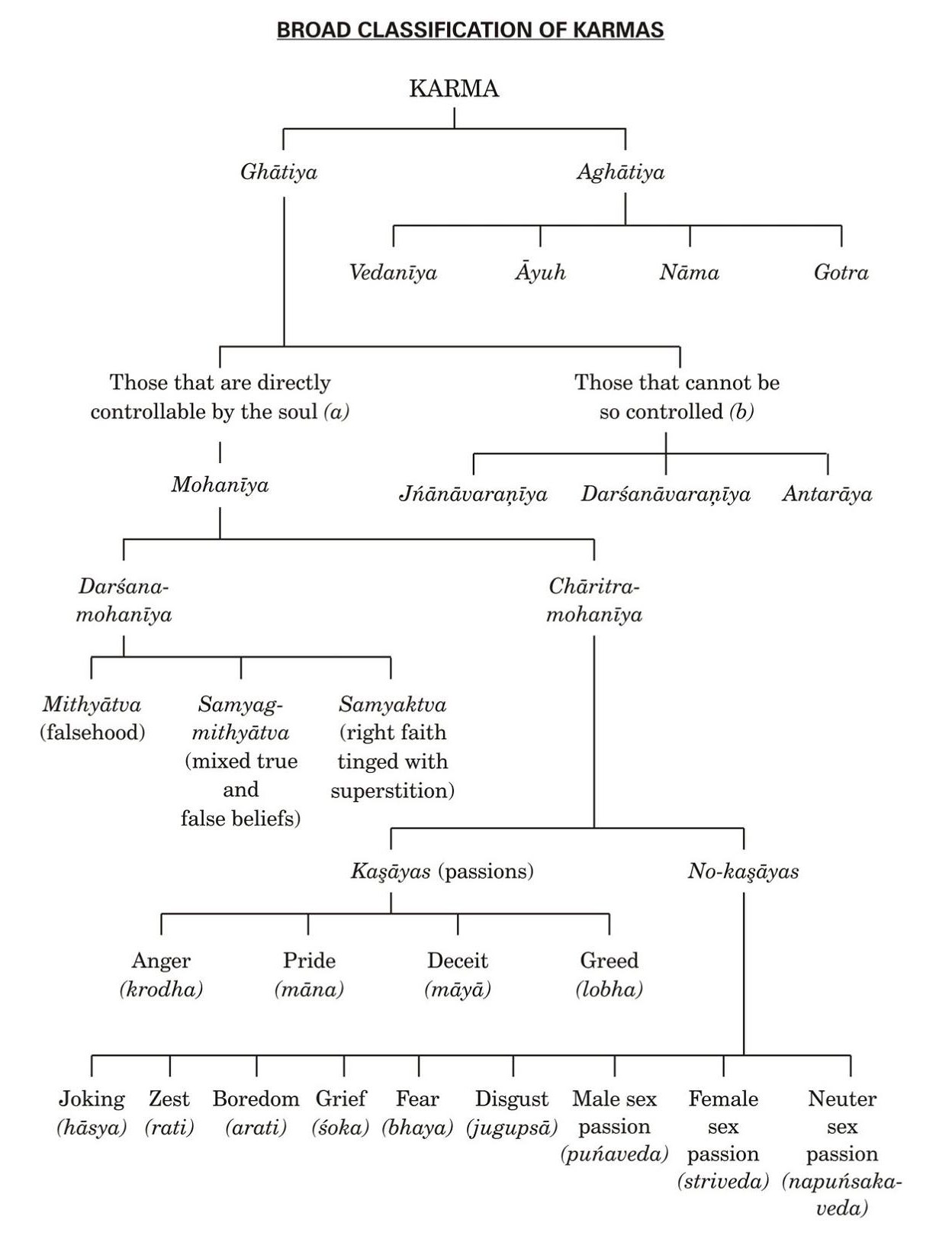
Classification of karmas as mentioned in Jain texts

In Jainism, as in other Indian religions, it is karma which is responsible for the different forms of life that souls will take. Karma is envisioned as a material substance (or subtle matter) that can bind to the soul, travel with the soul in bound form between rebirths, and affect the suffering and happiness experienced by the jiva in the lokas.

Jain texts compare karma to dust which gets stuck to a damp cloth (i.e. the soul and its passions). As such, karma is a kind of pollution that taints the soul with various colours (leśyā). Based on its karma, a soul undergoes transmigration and reincarnates in various states of existence—like heavens or hells, or as humans or animals. Jainism does not believe in an intermediate state like some schools of Buddhism, instead the souls is seen as "leaping like a monkey" in a sheath of subtle karmas from the dead body to a new body.

Karma is believed to obstruct the innate nature and striving of the soul, as well as its spiritual potential in the next rebirth. The vibrational energy of a soul is said to be what draws karmic particles to it and creates bondage. While the earliest texts focus on the role of the passions (kasāya, especially hatred) in attracting karmas, Umasvāti states that it is physical, verbal and mental activity which are responsible for the flowing in of karmic particles.

According to von Glasenapp, the main causes for the binding of karma are wrong view, defective self discipline, the passions and activity. Harming any life form will definitely have negative karmic effects.

According to Paul Dundas, the main difference between the Buddhist view of karma and the Jain view is that even involuntary actions would still lead to negative karmic effects for the person who did them. Furthermore, mental actions that are not carried out, causing someone else to carry out a bad action or merely approving of the action was not seen as being significantly different (with regard to karmic retribution).

In Jain works on karma, karmas are generally divided into 8 types, four harming (ghātiyā) karmas and four non-harming (aghātiyā) karmas. The harming karmas are the "delusion karma" (mohanīya) which leads to wrong views, the "karma which blocks knowledge" (jñānāvaraṇīya), the "karma that obscures perception" (darshanāvaranīya) and the "obstacle karma" (antarāya), which obstructs the innate energy of the soul. The non-harming karmas are "feeling" (vedanīya) karma which relates to pleasant or unpleasant experiences, "name" (nāman) karma which determines one's rebirth, "life" (āyus) karma that determines the lifespan and "clan" (gotra) karma which determines one's status.

The Jain doctrine also holds that it is possible for us to both modify our karma, and to obtain release from it, through the austerities (tapas) and purity of conduct. The ultimate Jain goal is spiritual liberation, which is often defined as release from all karmas. According to Jainism, some souls called abhavya (incapable) can never attain moksha (liberation). The abhavya state is entered after an intentional and shockingly evil act.

== Relationship between soul and body ==
The relationship between the soul (jīva) and the body is discussed in The Parmatma-Prakash by Acharya Yogindra and further elaborated in Rakesh Jhaveri's commentary Shrimad Rajchandraji's Atmasiddhi Shastra: Six Spiritual Truths of the Soul. These works explain the relationship through the doctrine of nayavāda (the theory of standpoints), according to which the same phenomenon may be described differently from different valid perspectives. Within this framework, cognition is interpreted differently from the practical (vyavahāra naya) and substantial (dravya naya) standpoints.

From the Vyavahāra Naya (practical standpoint), the soul is conventionally described as perceiving through the body. Vision occurs through the eyes, hearing through the ears, and cognition is explained through the functioning of the sense organs, nervous system, dravya manas (material mind), and the brain. This standpoint corresponds to ordinary experience and everyday language, in which the body is regarded as the instrument through which the soul manifests knowledge.

From the Dravya Naya (substantial standpoint), however, jīva and pudgala (matter) are distinct and eternal substances. Consciousness, knowledge (jñāna), and perception (darśana) are intrinsic qualities of the soul and cannot be produced by matter. Accordingly, the brain, nervous system, sense organs, and dravya manas neither generate consciousness nor transfer knowledge into the soul. They function only as material conditions accompanying cognition, while the soul itself remains the knower.

The process of cognition is further explained through the concept of jñeyākāra ("the form of the knowable"). In this view, the external object does not enter the soul, nor is knowledge transmitted from matter into consciousness. Instead, the soul manifests a mode corresponding to the object being known. For example, when a tree is perceived, the tree remains external while the soul manifests a tree-shaped mode of knowledge (jñeyākāra). Cognition is therefore regarded as a manifestation of the soul's inherent knowing nature rather than the transfer of information from matter.

For ordinary embodied beings (saṃsārī jīvas), the material activities of the sense organs, nervous system, dravya manas, and brain occur simultaneously with the manifestation of the corresponding jñeyākāra in the soul. Although these events appear causally connected from the practical standpoint, they are understood as parallel manifestations occurring under the influence of karmic conditions rather than as the transmission of consciousness or information from matter to the soul.

The limited scope of ordinary knowledge is attributed to jñānāvaraṇīya karma (knowledge-obscuring karma). Although the soul inherently possesses infinite knowledge, this karmic category obscures its natural capacity, resulting in finite and conditioned cognition. The body does not create knowledge but serves as an external material condition accompanying the manifestation of knowledge.

According to these explanations, the practical and substantial standpoints are complementary rather than contradictory. From the Vyavahāra Naya, the soul is conventionally said to know through the body and its material faculties. From the Dravya Naya, knowledge belongs exclusively to the soul, while the material processes of cognition and the manifestation of jñeyākāra occur concurrently under the influence of karmic conditions without any transfer of consciousness or knowledge between matter and the soul. Together, these standpoints reconcile empirical descriptions of cognition with the metaphysical distinction between jīva and pudgala.

== Ethics ==
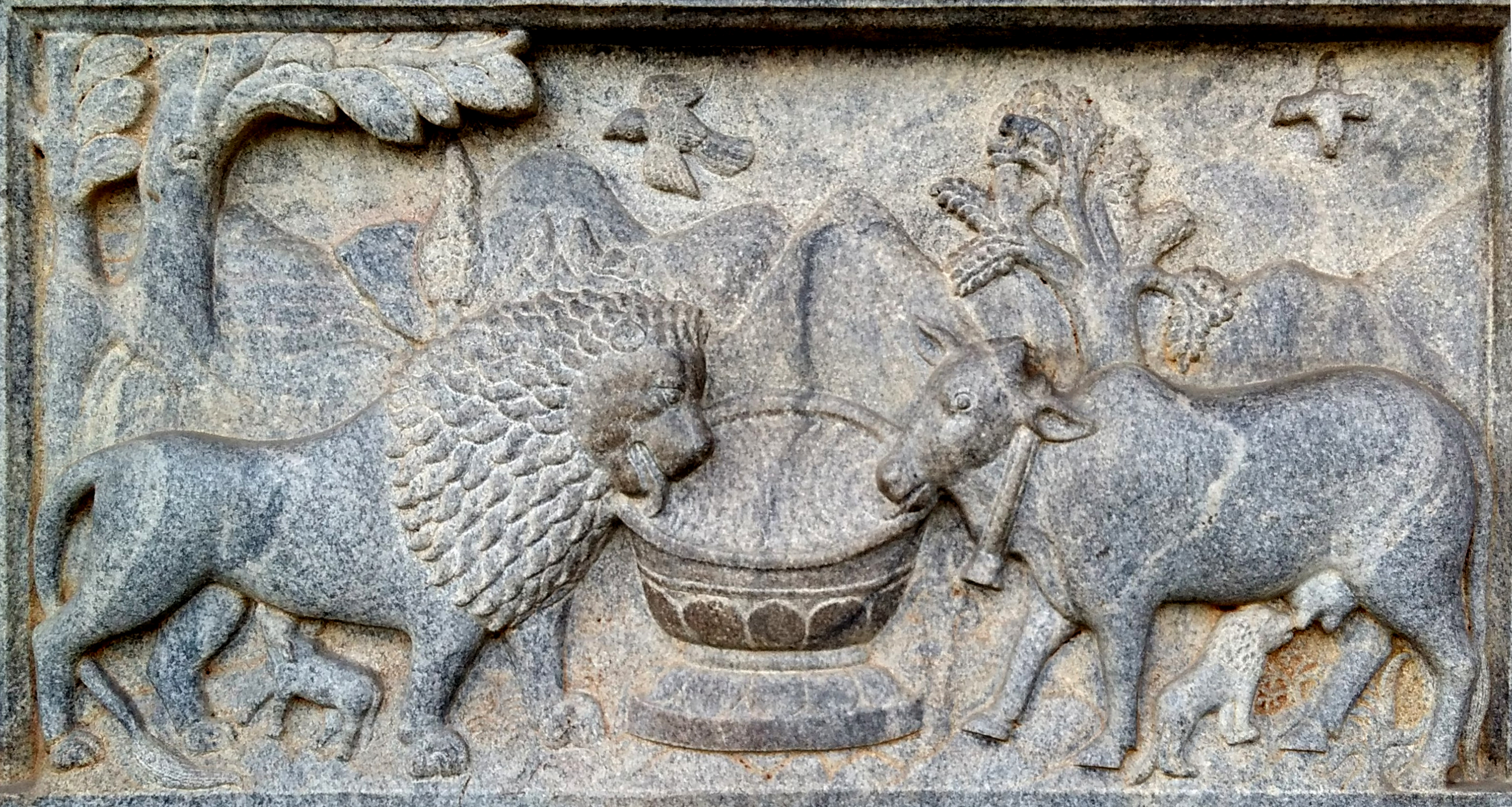
Sculpture depicting the Jain concept of ahimsa (non-injury)

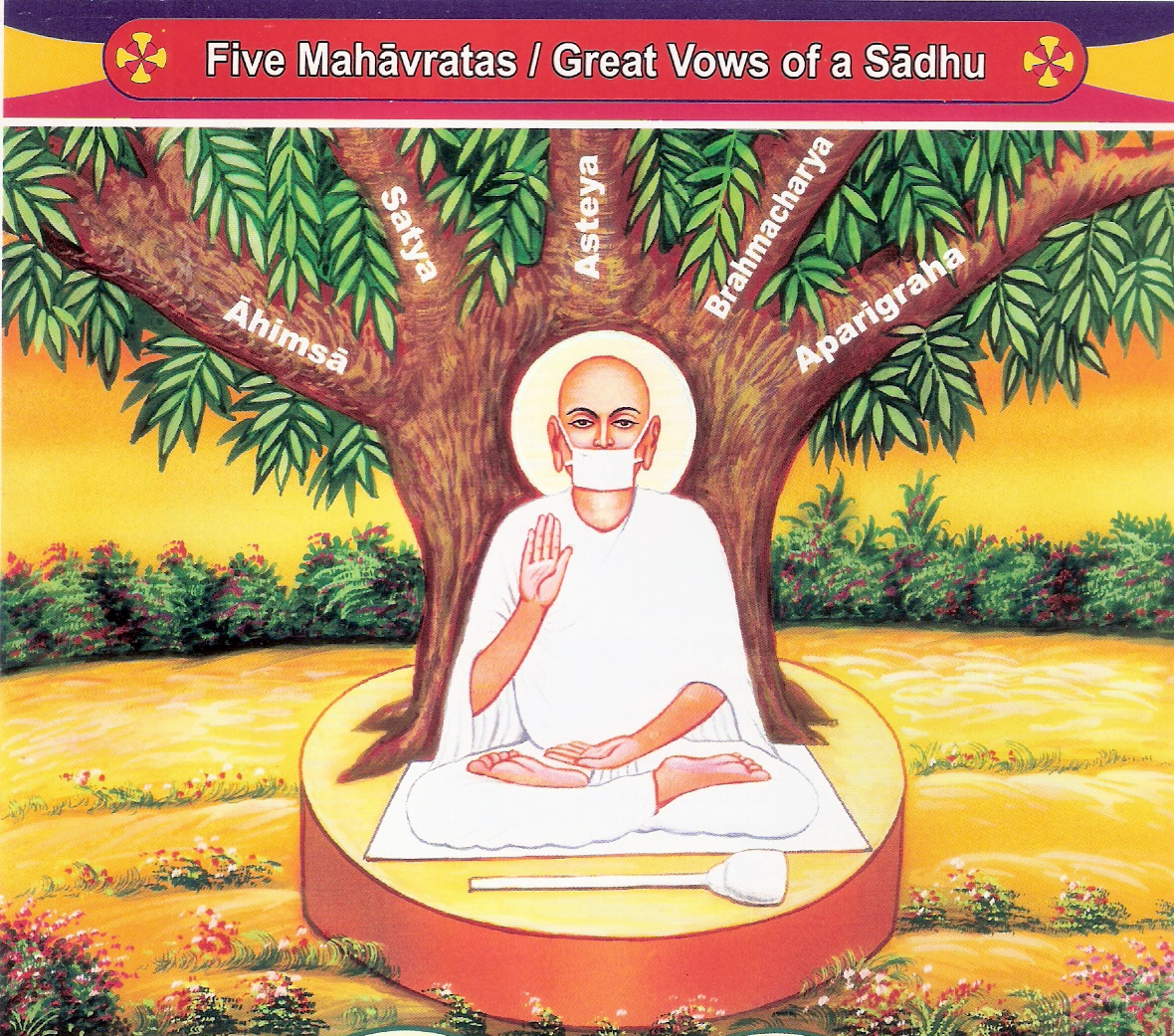
A depiction of a Jain monk and a tree depicting the five great vows. The Muhapatti (mouth covering) is a symbol of ahimsa and it is supposed to prevent small animals from flying into the mouth of the ascetic.

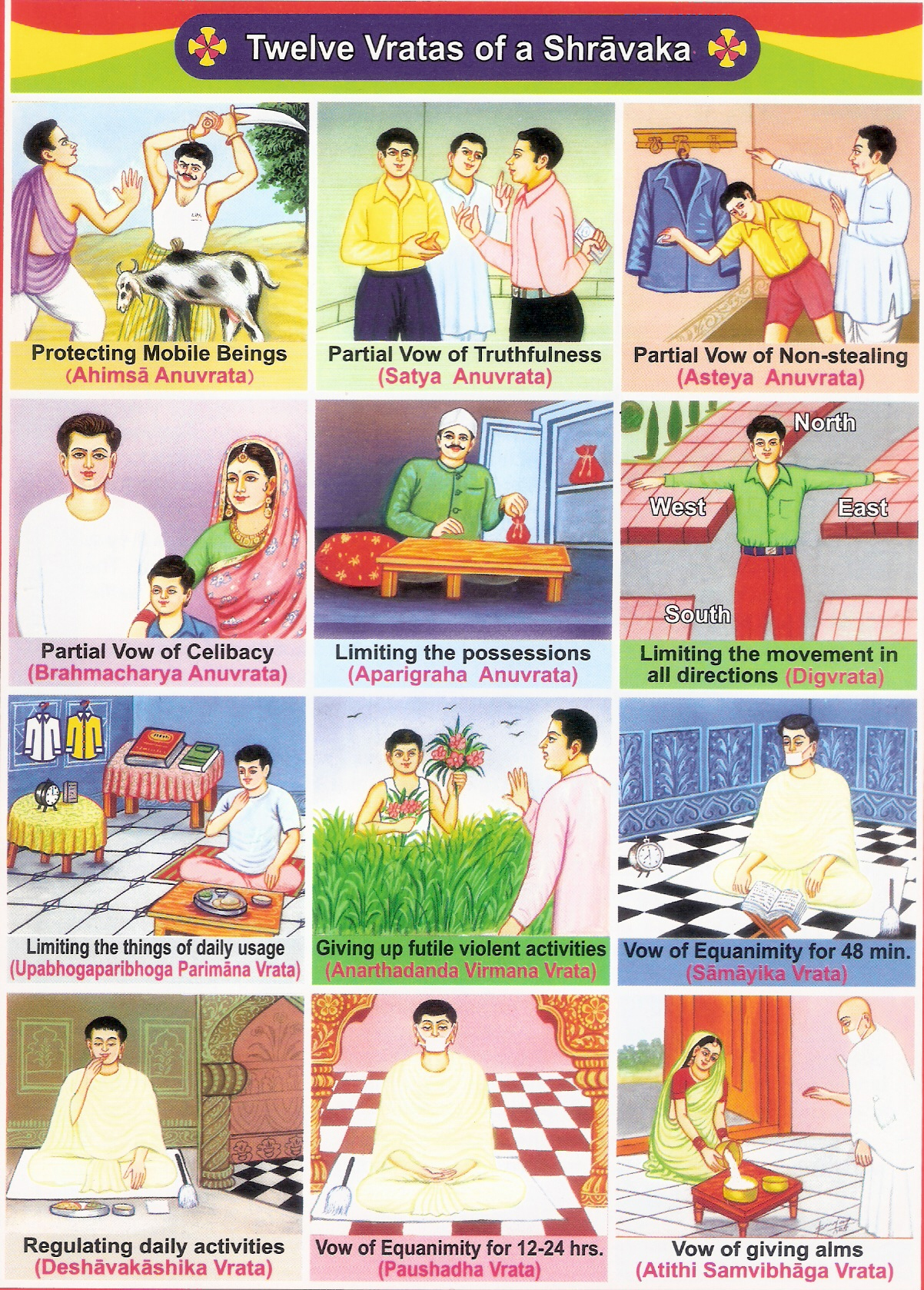
The twelve vows of a Jain lay disciple

Jain ethics is rooted in its metaphysics, particularly its karma theory. Jain philosophers hold that harmful actions (hiṃsā) cause the soul to be tainted and defiled with karmas. In fact, karma (good and bad) is constantly flowing (asrava) into soul as a result of actions by body, speech and mind, like water flowing into a lake.

As such, those who seek to stop (samvara) the influx of bad karmas (in order to reach liberation) should practice right conduct by observing certain ethical rules. Right conduct (samyak chāritra), is defined in the Sarvārthasiddhi as "the cessation of activity leading to the taking in of karmas by a wise person engaged in the removal of the causes of transmigration."

To prevent karmic particles from sticking to and tainting the soul, Jainism teaches five ethical duties, which it calls five vows. These come in two main forms, the anuvratas (small vows) for Jain laypersons, and mahavratas (great vows) for Jain mendicants.

The Five vows, which are taken even by Jain laypersons (who have knowledge of the doctrine) are:

1. Ahiṃsā ("non-violence", "non-harming", "non-injury"): The first major vow taken by Jains is to cause no harm to other human beings, as well as all living beings (particularly animals, but also plants). This is the highest ethical duty in Jainism, and it applies not only to one's actions, but demands that one be non-violent in one's speech and thoughts. According to the Tattvarthasutra, harming is defined as "the severance of vitalities out of passion". According to a Jain ethical text called the Puruşārthasiddhyupāya, "non-manifestation of passions like attachment is non-injury (ahiṃsā), and manifestation of such passions is injury (hiṃsā)." Vegetarianism and other nonviolent practices and rituals of Jains flow from the principle of ahiṃsā.
2. Satya, "truth": This vow is to always speak the truth. Neither lie, nor speak what is not true, and do not encourage others or approve anyone who speaks an untruth.
3. Asteya, "not stealing": A Jain layperson should not take anything that is not willingly given. Additionally, a Jain mendicant should ask for permission to take it if something is being given.
4. Brahmacharya, "celibacy": Abstinence from sex and sensual pleasures is prescribed for Jain monks and nuns. For laypersons, the vow means chastity, faithfulness to one's partner.
5. Aparigraha, "non-possessiveness": This includes non-attachment to material and psychological possessions, avoiding craving and greed. Jain monks and nuns completely renounce property and social relations, own nothing and are attached to no one.

Jain ascetics are even more scrupulous regarding the vows, for example, regarding the first vow of ahimsa, they will often carry a broom or another tool to sweep the floor of small animals in front of them.

Jain texts further prescribe seven supplementary vows, including three guņa vratas (merit vows) and four śikşā vratas (training vows). The three guṇa vows are:

1. digvrata – Restriction on movement with regard to the four directions.
2. bhogopabhogaparimana – Vow of limiting consumable and non-consumable things
3. anartha-dandaviramana – Refraining from harmful occupations and activities (purposeless sins).

The four śikşā vows are:

1. samayika – Meditate by sitting still and concentrate periodically (for one muhūrta of 48 minutes, or for two or three muhurtas).
2. desavrata – Limiting movement to certain places (house, village, etc.) for a fixed period of time.
3. upvas / paushad – Fasting for 24 hours on certain days (usually four times in a moon-month) or living a day which mimics the life of a Jain Monk.
4. atihti samvibhag – Offering food to ascetics and needy people.

Finally, there is a vow called Sallekhana (or Santhara), a "religious death" ritual observed at the end of life, historically by Jain monks and nuns, but rare in the modern age. This vow is a voluntary and gradual reduction of food and liquid resulting in the dispassionate ending of life. This is believed to reduce negative karma that affects a soul's future rebirths.

== Liberation and the Path ==
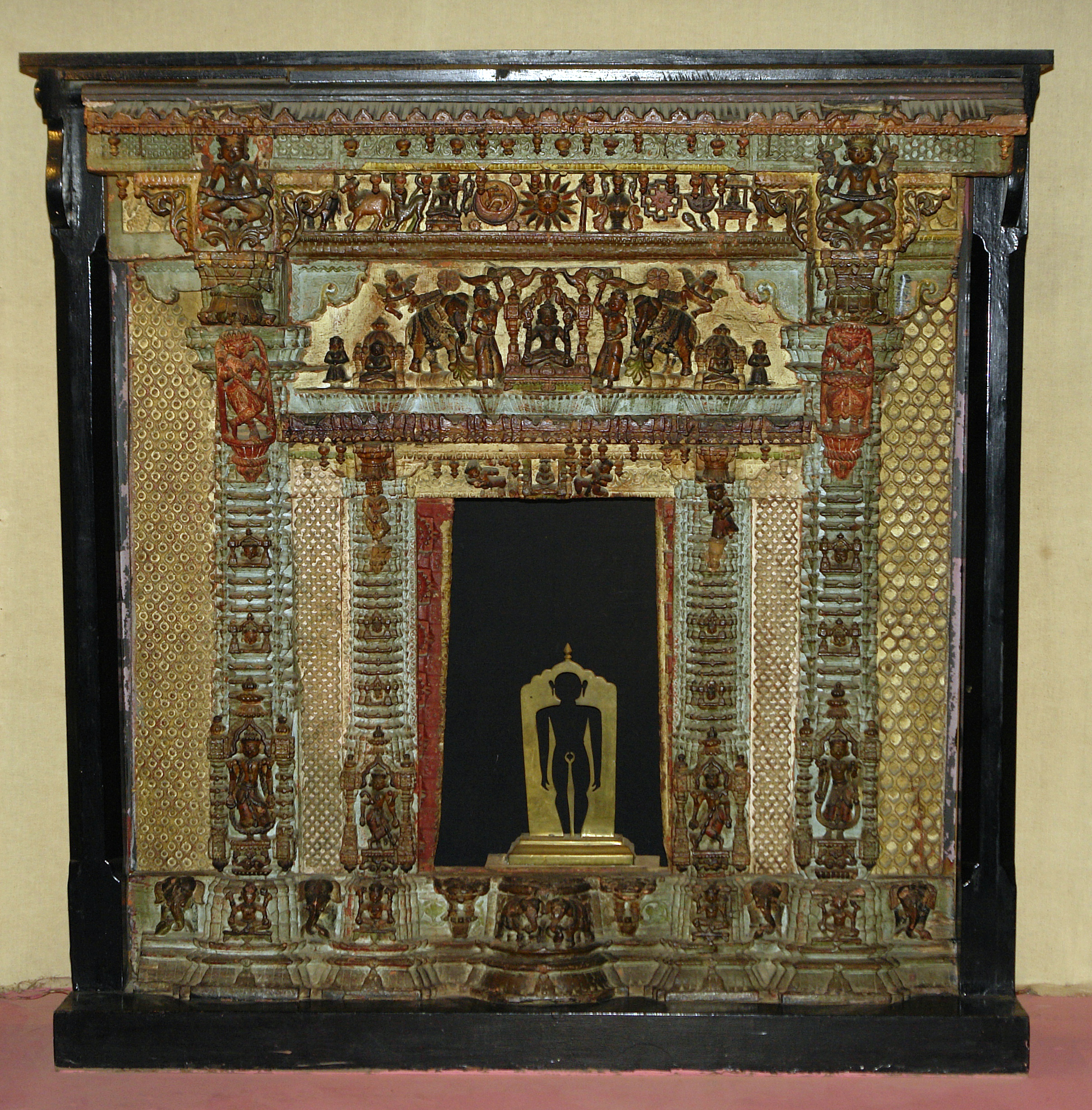
A Jain sculpture, the central figure is a depiction of a fully liberated soul, a siddha. The cut out outline of a human form symbolizes the non-material nature of siddhas.

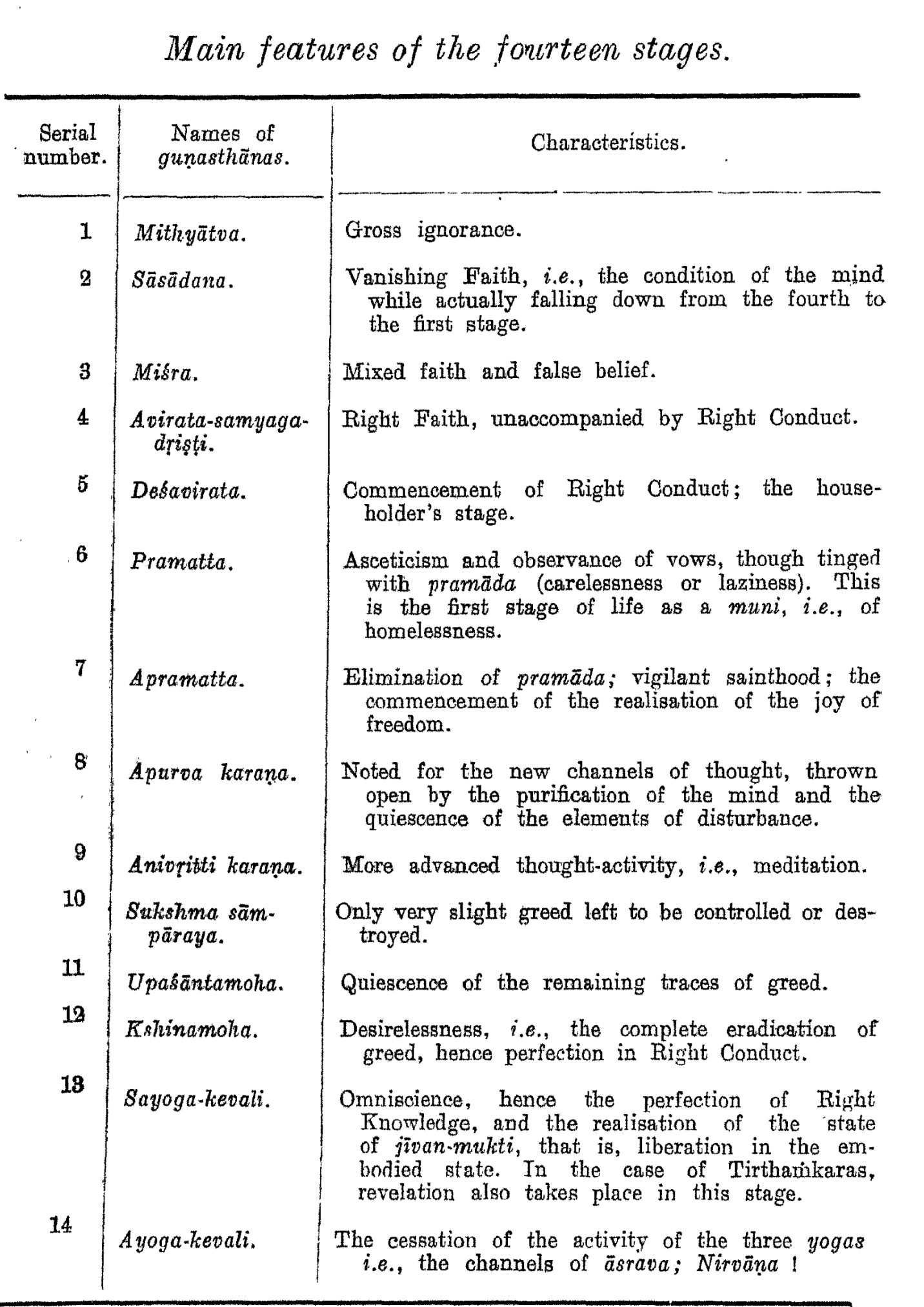
Fourteen stages on the path to liberation

Ācārya Pujyapada's defines liberation (moksha, kevala jñana) in his Sarvārthasiddhi as follows:

"Liberation is the attainment of an altogether different state of the soul, on the removal of all the impurities of karmic matter and the body, characterized by the inherent qualities of the soul such as knowledge and bliss free from pain and suffering."

At the moment of final liberation, a Kevalin (liberated soul) will become free of their body and in an instant rise up to the siddhaloka, the realm of liberated souls at the top of the universe. As explained by Dundas, the enlightened soul "will exist perpetually without any further rebirth in a disembodied and genderless state of perfect joy, energy, consciousness and knowledge."

Jains believe that the number of liberated souls is infinite. While these souls interpenetrate each other and all have the same qualities, Jainism strongly resists the idea that they are part of some monistic world soul (as in found in some schools of Hinduism). According to Haribhadra, this Hindu monism makes no sense.

Dundas outlines his critique as follows:

"If the world-soul were inherently pure, it would be difficult to explain why the phenomenal world is manifestly impure, while if it were impure, there would then be no point in the liberated jīvas merging with it."

Jain philosophers developed a schema of 14 stages of spiritual development called Gunasthana (Sanskrit: "levels of virtue"). These stages correspond to the abandoning of the various causes of karmic binding.

Those who pass the last stage are enlightened siddhas and become fully established in Right View, Right Knowledge and Right Conduct.

== History ==
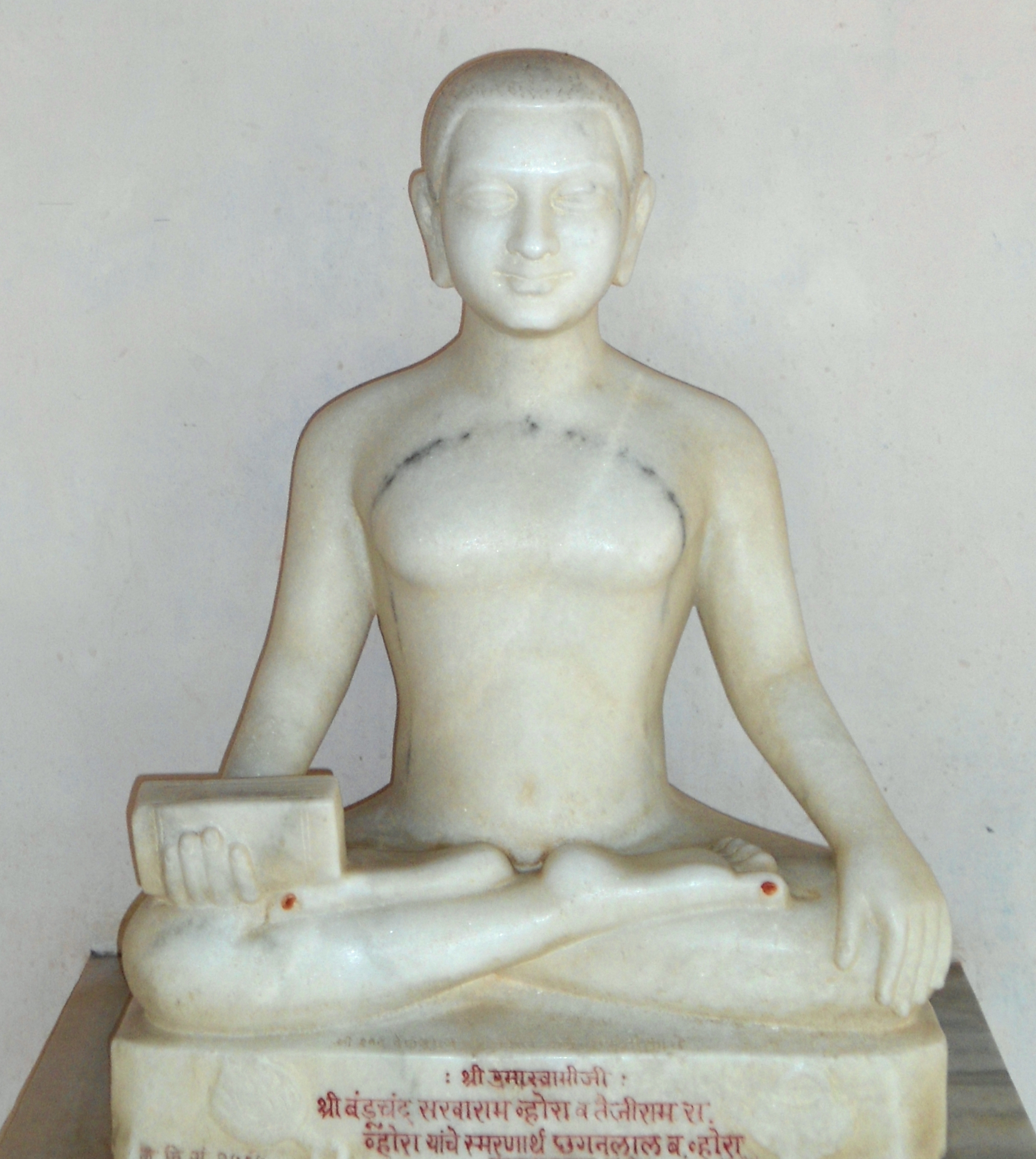
Umaswati, the first Jain philosopher to write a systematic exposition of Jain thought

The philosophy of early Jainism can be found in the Agamas. Though these early texts contain much philosophical content, it is not systematic and can be inconsistent.

Umaswati was probably the first systematic Jain philosopher. His Tattvārthasūtra drew together all the ancient Jain doctrines and presented them in a systematic sutra style. His work was extremely influential and is accepted by all Jain schools of thought today.

The main Digambara commentaries on the Tattvārthasūtra are those of Pūjyapāda (6th century), Akalaṇka (8th century) and Vidyānandi (9th century) while the main Śvetāmbara commentaries are Siddhaseṇa Gaṇin's 8th century commentary and the Sva-bhāṣya.

Harry Oldmeadow notes that Jain philosophy remained fairly standard throughout history and the later elaborations only sought to further elucidate preexisting doctrine and avoided changing the ontological status of the components. Dundas argues that this philosophical stability is largely due to the influence of Umaswati's work.

However, the Jain tradition has since ancient times been divided into the Śvetāmbara and the Digambara traditions. The schism arose mainly on account of differences in question of practice of nudity amongst monks and whether women could achieve liberation in female bodies. Apart from these differences, there are no other major philosophical differences between Jain sects, though there are different interpretations of the basic doctrines such as anēkāntavāda. This doctrinal conservatism in Jainism has led scholars like Padmanabh Jaini to remark that in the course Jain history there were never any radically new movements (like Mahayana, tantra or bhakti) which effectively challenged mainstream Jainism.

After the period of the early philosophers, like Umaswati, there follows a period of increasing philosophical sophistication, with a focus on epistemology (pramana) and logic (nyaya). This era saw the work of great epistemologists like Siddhasena Divakara, Samantabhadra and Akalanka. The work of Kundakunda, particularly his theory of the two truths, was also extremely influential, especially on Digambara philosophy. Jain philosophers' preoccupation with epistemology continued into the early modern period, which saw several great Jain scholars who wrote on the navya-nyaya (lit. 'new reason') philosophy, such as Yaśovijaya (1624–1688).

The Jain encounter with Islam also led to theological debates on the existence of God and on the use of violence. According to Paul Dundas, Jain thinkers faced with the Muslim destruction of their temples also began to revisit their theory of "ahimsa" (non-violence). Dundas notes how the 12th century Jain thinker Jinadatta Suri argued in favor of violence in self-defense. The modern era saw the rise of a new sect, the Śvētāmbara Terapanth, founded by Ācārya Bhikṣu in the 18th century. Terapanth scholars like Tulasī (1913–1997) and Ācārya Mahāprajña (1920– 2010) have been influential intellectual figures in modern Jainism, writing numerous works on Jain philosophy.

The modern era also saw the rise of new sects led by the laity as well as various influential intellectual figures. The non-sectarian cult of Shrimad Rajchandra (1867–1901) is well known due to it being a major influence on Mahatma Gandhi. Another influential figure was Kanjisvami, who was known for his stress on the mystical philosophy of Kundakunda.

== Contribution to Indian Thought ==
Mapping the 7 Nayas (viewpoints) of Jainism to Indian Philosophies
Naya	Description (Perspective)	Example in Jain Explanation	Corresponding Indian Philosophy	Jain Critique on Philosophy
Naigama Naya	Teleological or purpose-based viewpoint; focuses on the general purpose without attending to specific details.	A mango is meant to be eaten or juiced, irrespective of its ripeness or exact color.	Nyāya, Mīmāṁsā (focus on rituals/duties as essential purpose of life)	Overlooks the distinct intrinsic properties of entities beyond their utility or purpose.
Sangraha Naya	Generic or collective viewpoint; emphasizes classification or oneness based on shared qualities.	Mango, pineapple, banana: all are 'fruits', ignoring their differences.	Advaita Vedanta (Everything is Brahman — pure consciousness) and Samkhya	Ignores diversity; dismisses individuality and multiplicity of non conscious substances like matter, space, time, which have distinct natures.
Vyavahāra Naya	Practical, conventional viewpoint; understanding things as they are perceived and used in daily life.	A ripe mango is sweet and ready to eat.	Nyāya, Vaiśeṣika (World is real, known via logic and categorization) or Cārvāka	Misses deeper truths beyond practicality; tends towards realism without accounting for deeper or changing realities.
Ruju-sutra Naya	Momentary, state-specific viewpoint; focuses on the current, dynamic condition of an object.	Mango is yellowish now but might be overripe tomorrow.	Buddhism (Theravāda, Madhyamaka) (Everything is impermanent, no abiding self)	Overemphasizes transience, denies the underlying continuity or persistent substratum like the soul (jīva), matter (pudgala).
Shabda Naya	Based on linguistic meaning; focuses on understanding through words, terms, and conventions.	The word 'mango' and its meaning as per language.	Buddhist Madhyamaka (via linguistic deconstruction; Nāgārjuna's analysis of emptiness through language) or Grammar-based schools	Language is important but doesn’t fully capture ontological reality. Reliance on language can lead to verbalism detached from reality.
Samabhirudha Naya	Etymological and strict meaning-based viewpoint; focuses on precise definitions and correct usage of terms.	'Mango' should denote only a specific species, not any yellow fruit.	Nyāya, Grammar-based schools	Too fixated on linguistic precision, may lose broader experiential truths.
Evambhūta Naya	Functionality-based viewpoint; an entity is defined by its function or activity.	Only when mango is eaten or juiced, it fulfills its 'mango-ness'.	Mīmāṁsā (Rituals define dharma — things exist meaningfully when in action)	Reduces entities to their function alone, ignoring their essence or potential beyond functional use.
Summary: This table illustrates how each naya (standpoint) corresponds to a particular philosophical tendency when taken in isolation. While each school captures a partial truth, Jainism's doctrine of Anekāntavāda integrates all perspectives to present a holistic, non-absolutist understanding of reality. Jainism emphasizes that truth is multifaceted and can only be comprehended fully by synthesizing diverse viewpoints. Ultimately, however, the absolute truth (kevala-jñāna) is accessible only to the omniscient souls (Kevalajñānis), who perceive reality in its entirety, beyond all partial standpoints.

As one of the earliest and most influential of the sramana systems, Jainism influenced other Indian systems of thought. Scholarly research has shown that philosophical concepts that are typically Indian – Karma, Ahimsa, Moksa, reincarnation and like – either have their origins in the sramana traditions (one of the most ancient of which is Jainism). The sramanic ideal of mendicancy and renunciation, that the worldly life was full of suffering and that emancipation required giving up of desires and withdrawal into a lonely and contemplative life, was in stark contrast with the Brahmanical ideal of an active and ritually punctuated life based on sacrifices, household duties and chants to deities. Sramanas developed and laid emphasis on Ahimsa, Karma, moksa and renunciation.

Jain ideas seem to have had influence on Upanishadic Brahmanism; as well as on the Buddha and on Early Buddhism, and both worldviews share many common ideas (karma rebirth, an uncreated universe, ahimsa, denial of the Vedas). The Buddha is depicted as practicing forms of asceticism which are found in Jainism (though he later rejected many of these practices as too extreme). Helmuth von Glasenapp also argues that the Jain idea of non-violence, and particularly its promotion of vegetarianism, had an influence on Hinduism, especially on Vaishnavism. Furthermore, von Glasenapp argues that some Hindu philosophical systems, particularly the dualistic Vedanta of Madhvacarya, was influenced by Jain philosophy. He also states that it is possible that Shaivasiddhanta was influenced by Jain thought as well.

The Jain system of philosophy and ethics is also known for having had a major impact on modern figures like Dayanand Sarasvati and Mohandas Karamchand Gandhi.

The German scholar Georg Bühler writes "In grammar, astronomy as well as in all branches of Belles letters the achievements of the Jains have been so great that even their opponents have taken notice on them and that some of their work are importance for European science even today. In the south where they have worked among the Dravidian peoples, they have also promoted the development of these languages. The Kanarese [Kannada], Tamil, Telugu literary languages rest on the foundations erected by the jain monks.

=== Major Jain philosophers ===
Numerous Jain philosophers have contributed to the development of Jain thought. Below is a partial list of some of the main Jain philosophers.

- Umāsvāti or Umasvami (possibly between 2nd-century and 5th-century CE) – The author of the first Jain work in Sanskrit, the Tattvārthasūtra, which systematised Jain philosophy in a form acceptable to all sects of Jainism.
- Samantabhadra (c. 2nd – 5th century CE) – The first Jain writer to write on nyāya, (in his Apta-Mimāmsā). He also composed the Ratnakaranda śrāvakācāra and the Svayambhu Stotra.
- Kundakunda (c. sometime between the 2nd century and the 8th century CE). – An exponent of Jain metaphysics and an influential two truths theory. He was the author of Pañcāstikāyasāra "Essence of the Five Existents", the Pravacanasāra "Essence of the Scripture", the Samayasāra "Essence of the Doctrine", Niyamasāra "Essence of Discipline", Atthapāhuda "Eight Gifts", Dasabhatti "Ten Worships" and Bārasa Anuvekkhā "Twelve Contemplations".
- Siddhasena Divākara (c. 5th century) – Jain logician and author of important works in Sanskrit and Prakrit, such as, Nyāyāvatāra (on Logic) and Sanmatisūtra (dealing with the seven Jaina standpoints, knowledge and the objects of knowledge).
- Pujyapada (6th century) – Jain philosopher, grammarian, and Sanskritist. Composed Samadhitantra, Ishtopadesha and the Sarvarthasiddhi, a definitive commentary on the Tattvārthasūtra and Jainendra Vyakarana, the first work on Sanskrit grammar by a Jain monk.
- Manikyanandi (6th century) – Jain logician, composed the Parikshamaukham, a masterpiece in the karika style of the Classical Nyaya school.
- Jinabhadra Gaṇi (6th–7th century) – author of Avasyaksutra (Jain tenets) Visesanavati and Visesavasyakabhasya (Commentary on Jain essentials). He is said to have followed Siddhasena and compiled discussion and refutation on various views on Jaina doctrine.
- Akalanka (8th century) – key Jain logician, whose works such as Laghiyastraya, Pramānasangraha, Nyāyaviniscaya-vivarana, Siddhiviniscaya-vivarana, Astasati, Tattvārtharājavārtika, et al. are seen as landmarks in Indian logic. The impact of Akalanka may be surmised by the fact that Jain Nyāya is also known as Akalanka Nyāya.
- Mallavadin (8th century) – author of Nayacakra and Dvadasaranayacakra (Encyclopedia of Philosophy) which discusses the schools of Indian philosophy.
- Yogīndudeva (8th century), author of Paramātmaprakāśaḥ.
- Haribhadra (8th century) – Jain thinker, author, philosopher, satirist and proponent of anekāntavāda and yoga studies. His works include Ṣaḍdarśanasamuccaya, Yogabindu, Yogadṛṣṭisamuccaya and Dhurtakhyana. He pioneered the Dvatrimshatika genre of writing in Jainism, where various religious subjects were covered in 32 succinct Sanskrit verses.
- Prabhacandra (10th century) – Jain philosopher, composed a 106-Sutra Tattvarthasutra and exhaustive commentaries on two key works on Jain Nyaya, Prameyakamalamartanda, based on Manikyanandi's Parikshamukham and Nyayakumudacandra on Akalanka's Laghiyastraya.
- Nemichandra (10th century), author of the Gommatsāra, a compendium of Digambara doctrine.
- Abhayadeva (1057 to 1135) – author of Vadamahrnava (Ocean of Discussions) which is a 2,500 verse tika (Commentary) of Sanmartika and a treatise on logic.
- Acharya Hemachandra (1089–1173) – Jain thinker, author, historian, grammarian and logician. His works include Yogaśāstra and Trishashthishalakapurushacaritra and the Siddhahemavyakarana. He also authored an incomplete work on Jain Nyāya, titled Pramāna-Mimāmsā.
- Vadideva (11th century) – He was a senior contemporary of Hemacandra and is said to have authored Paramananayatattavalokalankara and its voluminous commentary the syadvadaratnakara, a work which focuses on the doctrine of Syādvāda.
- Vidyanandi (11th century) – Jain philosopher, composed a commentary on Acarya Umasvami's Tattvarthasutra, known as Tattvarthashlokavartika.
- Yaśovijaya (1624–1688) – Jain logician and one of the last intellectual giants to contribute to Jain philosophy. He specialised in Navya-Nyāya and commentaries on most of the earlier Jain Nyāya works by Samantabhadra, Akalanka, Manikyanandi, Vidyānandi, Prabhācandra and others in the then-prevalent Navya-Nyāya style. Yaśovijaya has to his credit a prolific literary output – more than 100 books in Sanskrit, Prakrit, Gujarati and Rajasthani. He is also famous for Jnanasara (essence of knowledge) and Adhayatmasara (essence of spirituality).
- Vinayavijaya (17th century), author of the encyclopedic Lokaprakāsha.
- Shrimad Rajchandra (19th century), composed Shri Atmasiddhi Shastra, a 142 spiritual treatise that expounds the 6 fundamental truths of the soul.
- Champat Rai Jain (20th century), ″As could be expected from a Barrister-at-Law of that era, he was a brilliant grammarian and logician; but more than that, he was a great philosopher." In his lectures and publications he attempted to present Jainism as a scientific religion.

== See also ==
- Ājīvika
- Buddhist philosophy
- Early Buddhism
- Ethics of Jainism
- Jain literature
- Jaina seven-valued logic
- Śramaṇa

== Sources ==
- Allday, J. (2001). Quarks, Leptons and The Big Bang. CRC Press. ISBN 978-0-3678-0623-1.
- Chatterjea, Tara (2001). Knowledge and Freedom in Indian Philosophy. Lanham, MD: Lexington Books. ISBN 0-7391-0692-9.
- Collins, Randall (2000). The sociology of philosophies: a global theory of intellectual change. Harvard University Press. ISBN 978-0674001879.
- Doniger, Wendy, ed. (1999), Encyclopedia of World Religions, Merriam-Webster, ISBN 0-87779-044-2
- Dowling, Elizabeth M.; Scarlett, W. George, eds. (2006), Encyclopedia of Religious and Spiritual Development, SAGE Publications, ISBN 0-7619-2883-9
- Dundas, Paul (1999). "Jain Perceptions of Islam in the Early Modern Period". Indo-Iranian Journal. 42 (1). Brill Academic: 35–46. doi:10.1163/000000099124993040. JSTOR 24663454. S2CID 161901119.
- Dundas, Paul (2002) [1992], The Jains (Second ed.), Routledge, ISBN 0-415-26605-X
- Grimes, John (1996). A Concise Dictionary of Indian Philosophy: Sanskrit Terms Defined in English. New York: Suny Press. ISBN 0-7914-3068-5.
- Hay, Stephen N. (1970). "Jain Influences on Gandhi's Early Thought". In Sibnarayan Ray (ed.). Gandhi India and the World. Bombay: Nachiketa Publishers.
- Jain, Champat Rai (1917). The Practical Path. The Central Jaina Publishing House.
- Jain, S.A. (1992) [First edition 1960], Reality (English Translation of Srimat Pujyapadacharya's Sarvarthasiddhi) (2nd ed.), Jwalamalini Trust, " This article incorporates text from this source, which is in the public domain."
- Jain, Vijay K. (2011), Acharya Umasvami's Tattvarthsutra (1st ed.), Uttarakhand: Vikalp Printers, ISBN 978-81-903639-2-1, " This article incorporates text from this source, which is in the public domain."
- Jain, Vijay K. (2011), Acharya Umasvami's Tattvarthsūtra (1st ed.), Uttarakhand: Vikalp Printers, ISBN 978-81-903639-2-1, " This article incorporates text from this source, which is in the public domain."
- Jain, Vijay K. (2012), Acharya Amritchandra's Purushartha Siddhyupaya: Realization of the Pure Self, With Hindi and English Translation, Vikalp Printers, ISBN 978-81-903639-4-5, " This article incorporates text from this source, which is in the public domain."
- Jain, Vijay K. (26 March 2014). Acarya Pujyapada's Istopadesa – the Golden Discourse. Vikalp Printers. ISBN 978-81-903639-6-9.
- Jaini, Padmanabh (1980). Doniger, Wendy (ed.). Karma and Rebirth in Classical Indian Traditions. University of California Press. ISBN 978-0-520-03923-0.
- Jaini, Padmanabh S. (1998) [1979]. The Jaina Path of Purification. Delhi: Motilal Banarsidass. ISBN 81-208-1578-5.
- Jaini, Padmanabh (2000). Collected Papers on Jaina Studies. Delhi: Motilal Banarsidass. ISBN 81-208-1691-9.
- James, Edwin Oliver (1969). Creation and Cosmology: A Historical and Comparative Inquiry. Netherland: Brill. ISBN 90-04-01617-1.
- Jansma, Rudi; Jain, Sneh Rani (2006), Introduction to Jainism, Jaipur: Prakrit Bharti Academy, ISBN 81-89698-09-5
- Kirtivijay, M. (1957), Jainism in nutshell, Bombay: Navprabhat Printing Press
- Koller, John M. (July 2000). "Syādvadā as the Epistemological Key to the Jaina Middle Way Metaphysics of Anekāntavāda". Philosophy East and West. 50 (3): 400–407. doi:10.1353/pew.2000.0009. ISSN 0031-8221. JSTOR 1400182. S2CID 170240551.
- Long, Jeffery D. (2009). Jainism: An Introduction. I.B. Tauris. ISBN 978-1-4416-3839-7. OCLC 608555139.
- Long, Jeffery D. (2013). Jainism: An Introduction. I.B. Tauris. ISBN 978-0-85771-392-6.
- McEvilley, Thomas (2002). The Shape of Ancient Thought: Comparative Studies in Greek and Indian Philosophies. New York: Allworth Communications. ISBN 1-58115-203-5.
- Oldmeadow, Harry (2007). Light from the East: Eastern Wisdom for the Modern West. Indiana: World Wisdom. ISBN 978-1-933316-22-2.
- Pande, Govindchandra (1994). Life and Thought of Sankaracarya. Delhi: Motilal Banarsidass. ISBN 81-208-1104-6.
- Panikar, Agustin; Sutcliffe, David (2010). Jainism: History, Society, Philosophy and Practice. Motilal Banarsidass.
- Prasad, Jyoti (2006). Religion & culture of the Jains. Delhi: Bharatiya Jnanpith.
- Rankin, Aidan D.; Mardia, Kantilal (2013). Living Jainism: An Ethical Science. John Hunt Publishing. ISBN 978-1-78099-911-1.
- Sangave, Vilas Adinath (1980) [1959]. Jaina Community: A Social Survey. Popular Prakashan. ISBN 0-317-12346-7.
- Sanghvi, Jayatilal S. (2008), A Treatise on Jainism, Forgotten Books, ISBN 978-1-60506-728-5
- Sethia, Tara (2004). Ahiṃsā, Anekānta and Jainism. Motilal Banarsidass.
- Shah, Natubhai (1998). Jainism: The World of Conquerors. Volume I and II. Sussex: Sussex Academy Press. ISBN 1-898723-30-3.
- Shah, Natubhai (2004) [First published in 1998]. Jainism: The World of Conquerors. Vol. I. Motilal Banarsidass. ISBN 978-81-208-1938-2.
- Singh, Upinder (2016). A History of Ancient and Early Medieval India: From the Stone Age to the 12th Century. Pearson Education. ISBN 978-93-325-6996-6.
- Soni, Jayandra (2000). "Basic Jaina Epistemology". Philosophy East and West. 50 (3): 367–377. JSTOR 1400179.
- Tatia, Nathmal (1994). Tattvārtha Sūtra: That Which Is of Vācaka Umāsvāti (in Sanskrit and English). Lanham, MD: Rowman Altamira. ISBN 0-7619-8993-5.
- Tukol, Justice T.K. (1976), Sallekhanā is Not Suicide (1st ed.), Ahmedabad: L.D. Institute of Indology, " This article incorporates text from this source, which is in the public domain."
- von Glasenapp, Helmuth (1925). Jainism: An Indian Religion of Salvation [Der Jainismus: Eine Indische Erlosungsreligion]. Translated by Shridhar B. Shrotri. Delhi: Motilal Banarsidass.
- von Glasenapp, Helmuth (1999). Jainism: An Indian Religion of Salvation. Delhi: Motilal Banarsidass. ISBN 81-208-1376-6.
- Williams, Robert (1991). Jaina Yoga: A Survey of the Mediaeval Śrāvakācāras. Motilal Banarsidass. ISBN 978-81-208-0775-4.
- Worthington, Vivian (1982). A History of Yoga. London: Routledge. ISBN 0-7100-9258-X.
- Zimmer, Heinrich (1953) [April 1952]. Campbell, Joseph (ed.). Philosophies of India. London: Routledge & Kegan Paul Ltd. ISBN 978-81-208-0739-6.
