= Akalanka (given name) =

Akalanka is a given name. Notable people with the name include:

- Akalanka (720–780), Indian Jain logician
- Akalanka Ganegama (born 1981), Sri Lankan cricketer
- Akalanka Peiris (born 2000), Sri Lankan swimmer
