= Keelavasal =

Suburb of Thanjavur, Tamil Nadu, India

Keelavasal is a suburb of the Thanjavur city in the Indian state of Tamil Nadu. It is very close to Karanthai, which is also a suburb of Thanjavur. The area of Keelavasal is mostly popular for cosmetics and home fittings.
