= Helmuth von Glasenapp =

German Indologist and religion scholar (1891–1963)

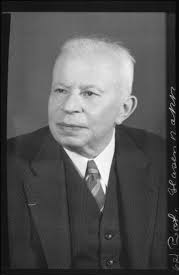
- Charlotte Gröger / Universitätsarchiv Tübingen, circa 1960
- Born: 8 September 1891; Berlin, Brandenburg, Prussia, German Empire
- Died: 25 June 1963 (aged 71); Tübingen, West Germany

Otto Max Helmuth von Glasenapp (8 September 1891 – 25 June 1963) was a German Indologist and religion scholar specialized as a historian of Indian philosophy, who taught as a professor at the University of Königsberg in East Prussia (1928–1944) and the University of Tübingen (1946–1959). He was a member of several academic and literary institutions in post-war Germany, including the Akademie der Wissenschaften und der Literatur, Deutsche Akademie für Sprache und Dichtung, and PEN Centre Germany.

== Biography ==
Von Glasenapp came from the widely ramified Pomeranian noble family of Glasenapp, belonged to an aristocratic branch of the family founded in 1805, and was the son of Otto Georg Bogislaf von Glasenapp, later Vice President of the Reichsbank, and his wife Lilli, née Jähns. His uncle was Kurt Karl Gustav von Glasenapp, a notable film censor in the German Empire.

From 1910 to 1914, von Glasenapp studied Sanskrit, Pāli, and general Religious studies at the University of Tübingen, the Ludwig-Maximilians-Universität München, the Royal Friedrich Wilhelm University of Berlin, and the University of Bonn. In 1914, he received his doctorate in Bonn under the German Indologist Hermann Jacobi with a dissertation on the doctrine of Karma in Jain philosophy. During the First World War, he worked for the German Foreign Office in its newly founded Intelligence Bureau for the East. Due to his expertise in Punjābi and Hindī languages, he also became part of the Royal Prussian Phonographic Commission. The aim of the commission was to record the approximately 250 languages spoken by the internees in the German prisoner-of-war camps.

In 1918, von Glasenapp was habilitated in Bonn with a thesis on Madhvā's system of Vaishnava beliefs and gave his inaugural lecture in May 1918, but was unable to take up teaching due to the turmoil of war and was finally rehabilitated in Berlin in April 1920, where he taught as a private lecturer until 1928. From 1927 to 1928, he travelled to British-ruled India with his cousin Udo von Alvensleben. Von Glasenapp travelled to India for the first time in 1927, and undertook numerous other study and lecture trips to various countries in colonial Africa and the East over the following decades.

In 1928, von Glasenapp succeeded Rudolf Otto Franke as Associate Professor of Indology at the Albertus University in Königsberg, a position he held until the end of the Second World War. On 6 May 1946, he was given the chair of Indology and Comparative Religious Studies of his former teacher Richard Karl von Garbe in Tübingen, which had become vacant following the dismissal of Jakob Wilhelm Hauer. He retired in 1959, but continued to lecture until his death in 1963, primarily in the field of Religious studies, while the field of Indology was taken over by his successor Paul Thieme. Von Glasenapp was awarded the Order of Merit of the Federal Republic of Germany in 1961. He died at the age of 72 as the result of a road accident. His final resting place was in the Bergfriedhof cemetery in Tübingen. His autobiography, Meine Lebensreise, was published posthumously in 1964.

== Works ==
In addition to numerous individual historical-philological studies on works of Sanskrit literature and German translations of Classical Sanskrit poetry, von Glasenapp published a series of comprehensive overviews of the three major Dharmic religions (Hinduism, Jainism, and Buddhism) and their respective philosophies, some of which are still regarded as standard works today, have been reprinted numerous times in various languages and have also met with a wide reception in India. Von Glasenapp also analysed the relationship between modern German philosophers, such as Immanuel Kant and Johann Gottfried von Herder, as well as ancient Indian philosophical systems in several academic publications.

- Die Lehre vom Karman in der Philosophie der Jainas nach den Karmagranthas. Phil. Diss. (Bonn), Harrassowitz, Leipzig 1915.
- Der Hinduismus. Religion und Gesellschaft im heutigen Indien. Kurt Wolff, Munich 1922.
- Madhvas Philosophie des Vishnu-Glaubens. Mit einer Einleitung über Madhva und seine Schule. Schroeder, Bonn 1923.
- Indien. (Der indische Kulturkreis in Einzeldarstellungen, hg. von Karl Döhring), Georg Müller, Munich 1925.
- Der Jainismus. Eine indische Erlösungsreligion. Alf Häger, Berlin 1925.
- Brahma und Buddha. Die Religionen Indiens in ihrer geschichtlichen Entwicklung. Deutsche Buchgemeinschaft, Berlin 1926.
- Religiöse Reformbewegungen im heutigen Indien. Hinrichs, Leipzig 1928.
- Heilige Stätten Indiens. Die Wallfahrtsorte der Hindus, Jainas und Buddhisten, ihre Legenden und ihr Kultus. Georg Müller, Munich 1928.
- Britisch-Indien und Ceylon. (Weltpolitische Bücherei, Band 14) Zentralverlag, Berlin 1929.
- Die Literaturen Indiens von ihren Anfängen bis zur Gegenwart. Athenaion, Potsdam 1929.
- Der Buddhismus in Indien und im Fernen Osten. Schicksale und Lebensformen einer Erlösungsreligion. Atlantis, Berlin 1936.
- Buddhistische Mysterien. Die geheimen Lehren und Riten des Diamant-Fahrzeugs. Spemann, Stuttgart 1940.
- Die Religionen Indiens. Kröner, Stuttgart 1943.
- Die Weisheit des Buddha. Bühler, Baden-Baden 1946.
- Der Stufenweg zum Göttlichen. Shankaras Philosophie der All-Einheit. Bühler, Baden-Baden 1948.
- Die Philosophie der Inder. Eine Einführung in ihre Geschichte und ihre Lehren. Kröner, Stuttgart 1949.
- Die fünf großen Religionen, 2 Bände:
  - Band 1: Brahmanismus. Buddhismus. Chinesischer Universalismus. Diederichs, Düsseldorf/Cologne 1951.
  - Band 2: Islam und Christentum. Diederichs, Düsseldorf/Cologne 1952.
- Die Religionen der Menschheit. Ihre Gegensätze und ihre Übereinstimmungen. (Unesco Schriftenreihe, Band 6), Wilhelm Frick, Vienna 1954.
- Kant und die Religionen des Ostens. Holzner, Kitzingen-Main 1954.
- Buddhismus und Gottesidee. Die buddhistischen Lehren von den überweltlichen Wesen und Mächten und ihre religionsgeschichtlichen Parallelen. Akademie der Wissenschaften und der Literatur, Mainz 1954.
- Der Pfad zur Erleuchtung. Grundtexte der buddhistischen Heilslehre. Diederichs, Düsseldorf/Cologne 1956.
- Glaube und Ritus der Hochreligionen in vergleichender Übersicht. (Fischer Bücherei 346), S. Fischer, Frankfurt am Main 1960.
- Meine Lebensreise. Menschen, Länder und Dinge, die ich sah. Brockhaus, Wiesbaden 1964.

Schriftenverzeichnis

- Zoltán Károlyi: Helmuth von Glasenapp-Bibliographie, Harrassowitz, Wiesbaden 1968, ISBN 978-3-447-04850-7.

Kleine Schriften

- Volker Moeller, Heinz Bechert (eds.): Helmuth von Glasenapp: Ausgewählte Kleine Schriften. Mit einem Nachtrag zur Helmuth von Glasenapp-Bibliographie von Zoltán Károlyi, Harrassowitz, Wiesbaden 1980, ISBN 978-3-447-04863-7.

== Bibliography ==
- Butzenberger, Klaus (2003). "Helmuth von Glasenapps Beiträge zur Jininismus-Forschung". In Brückner, Heidrun (ed.). Indienforschung im Zeitenwandel. Analysen und Dokumente zur Indologie und Religionswissenschaft in Tübingen (in German). Tübingen: Attempto. pp. 227–250. ISBN 978-3-89308-345-9.
- Christof, Martin (2003). "Helmuth von Glasenapp als Indologe und Religionswissenschaftler: Der Hinduismusbegriff". In Brückner, Heidrun (ed.). Indienforschung im Zeitenwandel. Analysen und Dokumente zur Indologie und Religionswissenschaft in Tübingen (in German). Tübingen: Attempto. pp. 209–226. ISBN 978-3-89308-345-9.
- Cush, Denise; Robinson, Catherine; York, Michael (2012) [2008]. Encyclopedia of Hinduism (2nd ed.). London and New York: Routledge. ISBN 978-1135189785.
- Hoffmann, Helmut (1964). "Glasenapp, Helmuth von". Neue Deutsche Biographie (in German). Vol. 6. Berlin: Duncker & Humblot. pp. 427–428. (full text online).
- Károlyi, Zoltán (1968). Helmuth von Glasenapp-Bibliographie (in German). Wiesbaden: Harrassowitz Verlag. ISBN 978-3-447-04850-7.
- Moeller, Volker; Bechert, Heinz, eds. (1980). Helmuth von Glasenapp: Ausgewählte Kleine Schriften. Mit einem Nachtrag zur Helmuth von Glasenapp-Bibliographie von Zoltán Károlyi (in German). Wiesbaden: Harrassowitz Verlag. ISBN 978-3-447-04863-7.
- Moeller, Volker; Nölle, Wilfried, eds. (1962). Von Buddha zu Gandhi. Aufsätze zur Geschichte der Religionen Indiens (in German). Wiesbaden: Harrassowitz Verlag. LCCN 67121855.
