= Akalanka =

Indian Jain monk

Acharya Shri 108 Akalanka Ji Maharaj
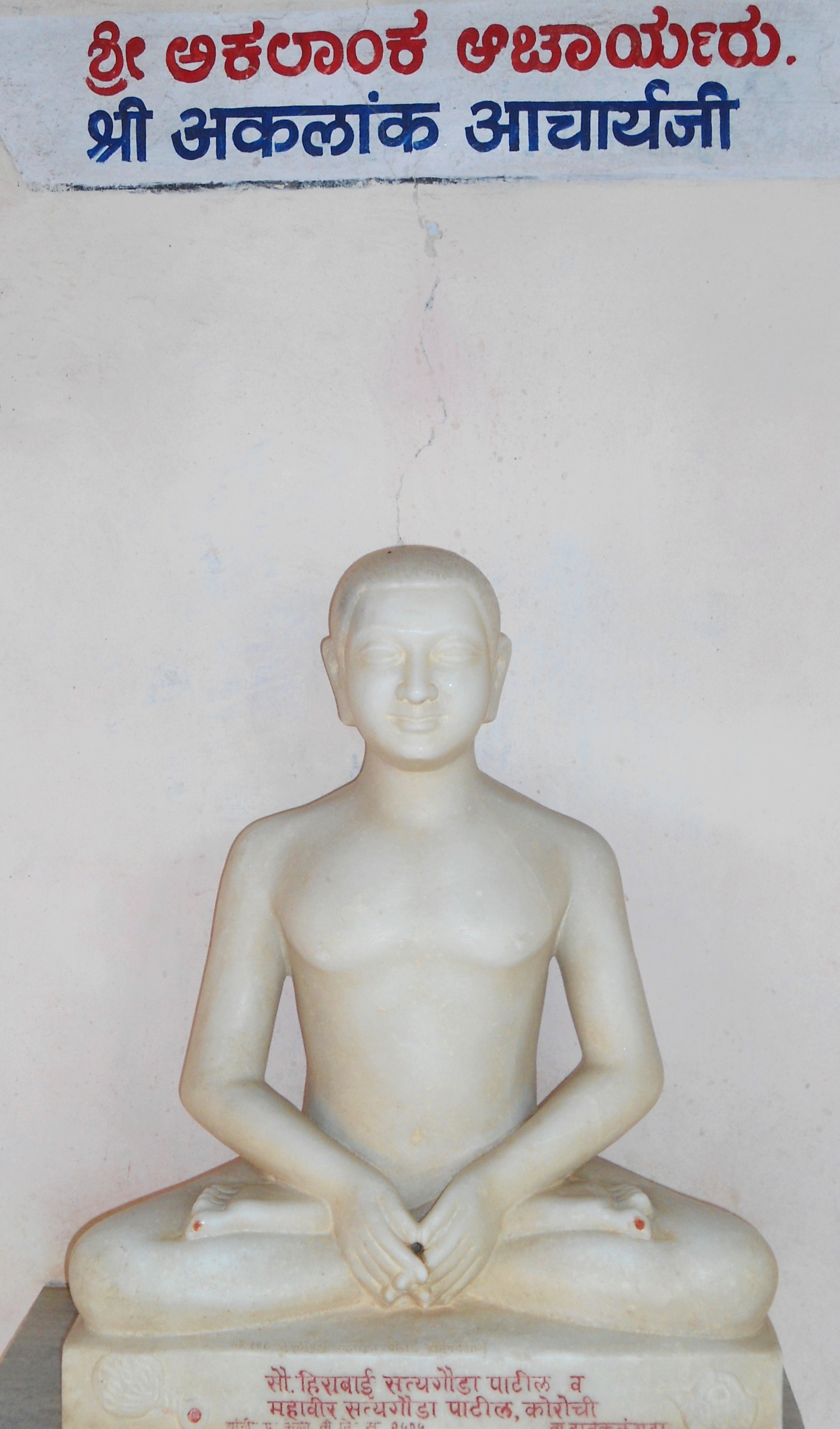
- Image of Acharya Akalanka

Personal life
- Born: 720 CE
- Died: 780CE

Religious life
- Religion: Jainism
- Sect: Digambara

Akalaṅka (IAST: Akalaṅka) (also known as Akalaṅkadeva and Bhatta Akalaṅka) was a Jain logician whose Sanskrit-language works are seen as landmarks in Indian logic. He lived from 720 to 780 CE and belonged to the Digambara sect of Jainism. His work Aṣṭaśatī, a commentary on Āptamīmaṃsa of Ācārya Samantabhadra deals mainly with Jaina logic. He was a contemporary of Rāṣṭrakūta king Krishna I. He is the author of Tattvārtharājavārtika, a commentary on major Jaina text Tattvārtha Sutra. He greatly contributed to the development of the philosophy of Anekāntavāda and is therefore called the "Master of Jain logic".

== Life ==
Akalaṅka flourished in 750 CE. He was aware of the contents of the Aṅgas, although it cannot be said whether they represent an idea rather than a reality for him, and he also seems to have been the first Digambara to have introduced as a valid form of scriptural classification the division into kālika and utkālika texts which was also employed by the Śvetāmbaras. He is mentioned as a logician and a contemporary of Subhatunga and Rāṣṭrakūta king Krishna I.

The samādhi of Akalaṅka is located between Thurupammor and Karanthai villages, at a distance of 19 km from Kanchipuram, Tamil Nadu.

== Works ==
The following Sanskrit-language works are attributed to Akalaṅka. Some of these are:

1. Laghīyastraya: A compendium of three small treatises – Pramāṇapraveśa, Nayapraveśa, and Pravacanapraveśa.
2. Pramānasaṅgraha: A work on epistemology or pramāṇa.
3. Nyāyaviniścaya: A work dealing with perception, inference and pravacana.
4. Siddhiviniscaya-vivarana
5. Aṣṭaśatī: A short but important commentary on Samantabhadra's Aptamimamsa.
6. Tattvārtharājavārtika: A commentary on Tattvartha Sutra resembling to Nyāyavārtika of Udyotakara

== See also ==
- Acharya Shri Akalaṅka Educational Trust
- Karanthai Samadhi of Acharya Akalaṅka at Thurupammor-Karanthai, Tamil Nadu
- Devardhigani Kshamashraman
- Hemachandra
- Hiravijaya
