= Dhyanatray =

Indian writer

- Born: 1676
- Died: 1726 (aged 49–50)

Dhayanatray (1676-1726) was an Indian writer who wrote on Jainism.

== Life ==
Dhyanatray was born in 1676 at Agra. He died in 1726.

== Works ==
Dhayanatray translated Svayambhustotra in Agra, which is a fifth-century CE Sanskrit adoration of the twenty-four tirthankaras written by Samantabhadra in 143 verses.
