= Pujyapada =

Indian Jain monk (464–524)

Acharya Shri 108 Pujyapada Ji Maharaj
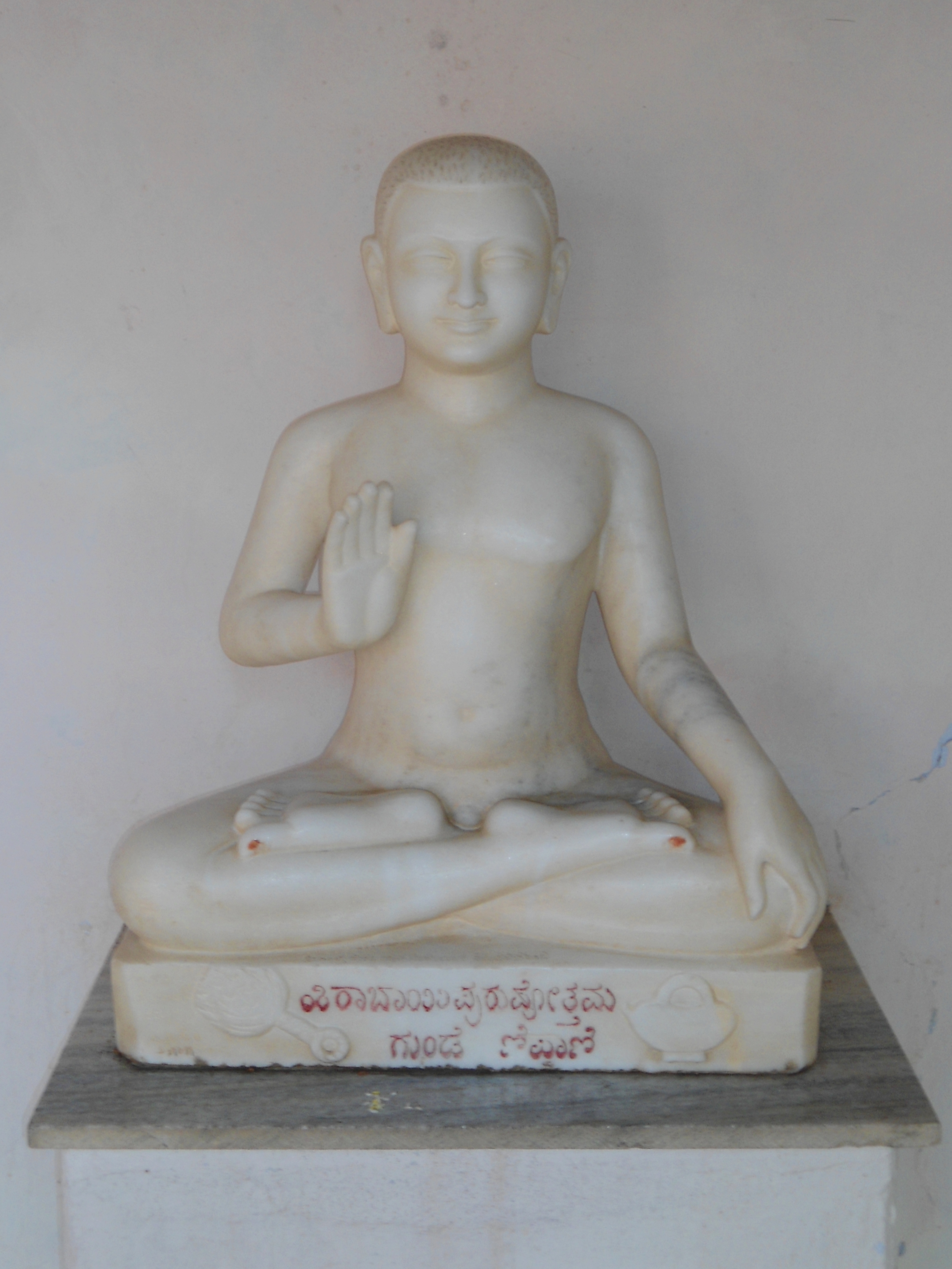
- Digambara Acharya

Personal life
- Born: Devanandi; 464 CE
- Died: 524 (aged 59–60)
- Parents: Madhava Bhatta (father); Shridevi (mother)
- Notable work(s): Sarvārthasiddhi, Iṣṭopadeśa

Religious life
- Religion: Jainism
- Sect: Digambara

Religious career
- Disciples: Durvinita

Acharya Pujyapada or Pūjyapāda (464–524 CE) was a renowned grammarian and acharya (philosopher monk) belonging to the Digambara tradition of Jains. It was believed that he was worshiped by demigods on the account of his vast scholarship and deep piety, and thus, he was named Pujyapada. He was said to be the guru of King Durvinita of the Western Ganga dynasty.

== Life ==
Pujyapada is dated to have lived around 510 CE to 600 CE. Born as Devanandi to parents Madhava Bhatta and Shridevi, he became a Digambara monk, as well as a yogi, mystic, poet, scholar, author and master of several branches of learning. He was born in a Jain Brahmans (In Jain philosophy, a pratimādhārī shravaka—a layperson with vows—is considered a Brahman) family of Karnataka.

He earned the title Pujyapada since he is considered to have devas from heaven come to do puja of his feet (pada). He was heavily influenced by the writings of earlier Digambaras like Kundakunda and Samantabhadra. He is regarded as the greatest of the early masters of Jain literature. He was a prominent preceptor, with an impeccable ancestry and spiritual lineage. He was the tenth guru of the lineage of the Nandi Sangha which began with Kundakunda.

It is likely that he was the first Jain saint to write not only on religion but also on non-religious subjects, such as Ayurveda and Sanskrit grammar, and was a master of Sanskrit poetics and of ayurveda. All of his works, both prose and verse, were written in Sanskrit.

In his Sarvarthasiddhi, Pujyapada defined Dāna (charity) as the act of giving one's wealth to another for mutual benefit.

== Works ==
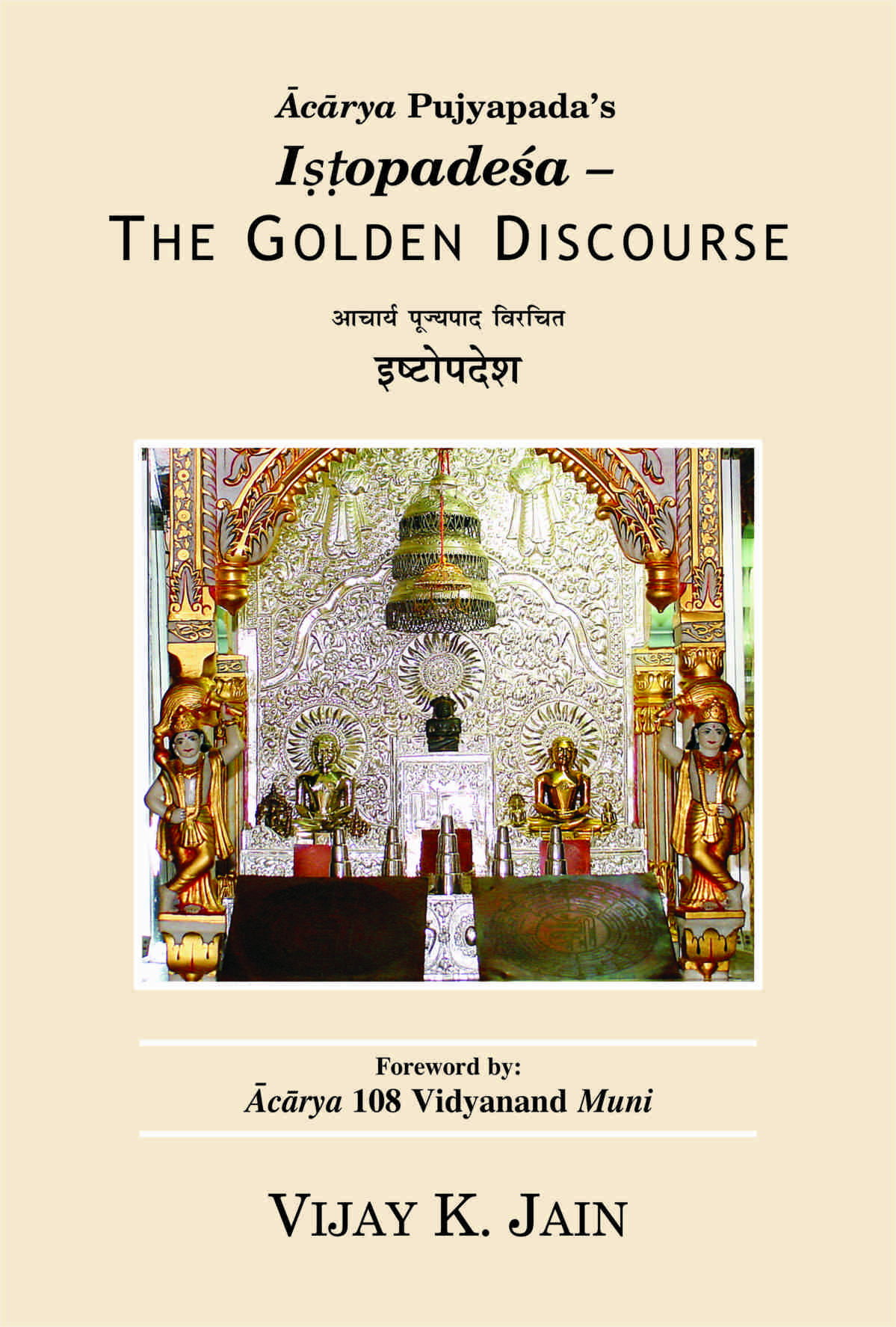
Book cover of one of the English translation of Iṣṭopadeśa

- Iṣṭopadeśa (Divine Sermons) – a concise work of 51 verses, it uses everyday examples to address ethical aspects of life. Acharya Pujyapada writes that one needs to realize the difference between the eternal soul and mutable body, the trivial and important, the essential and non-essential, to attain liberation. Without this realization, even devotion and meritous actions do not lead to liberation.
- Sarvārthasiddhi (Attainment of Higher Goals) - Sarvārthasiddhi is a commentary on the Tattvārthasūtra, noted for its precision and conciseness. It serves as the definitive mula patha for all Digambara works on the Tattvārthasūtra. It is the earliest surviving commentary on the Tattvārthasūtra, since the earlier commentary, the Gandhahastī Mahābhāṣya of Acharya Samantabhadra, is no longer extant.
- Jainendra Vyākaraṇa (Jainendra Grammar) - considered one of the finest early works on Sanskrit grammar.
- Samādhitantra (Method of Self-Contemplation) – It is a treatise of 106 verses on yoga and spiritual practice, outlining the path to liberation through differentiation of the soul from the body.
- Daśabhaktyādisangraha (Collection of Ten Adorations) - a collection of the adoration of the essentials that help the soul in acquiring merit. The essentials include the Supreme Beings, the Scripture, the Perfect Conduct, and the sacred places like the Nandīśvara Dvīpa.
- Śāntyāṣṭaka (Hymn in Praise of Śāntinātha) - A poem of 8 verses in adoration of Bhagavān Śāntinātha, the 16th Tīrthankara.
- Śabdāvatāranyāsa (Arrangement of Words and their Forms) - A work on Sanskrit grammar, said to be a gloss on Pāṇinī
- Jainābhiṣeka (Jain Anointment) - A work on Jain rituals.
- Chandaśāstra (Treatise on Prosody) - A work on Sanskrit prosody.

== See also ==
- Devardhigani Kshamashraman
- Hemachandra
- Hiravijaya
