= Richard Karl von Garbe =

German Indologist (1857–1927)

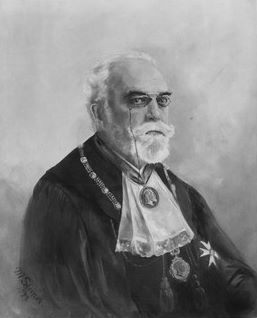
Richard Karl von Garbe

Richard Karl von Garbe (9 March 1857, Bredow, Szczecin - 22 September 1927, Tübingen) was a German professor of philosophy, who made significant contributions to documenting and studying Indian philosophical texts and concepts.

== Life and education ==
Von Garbe was born on 9 March 1857 at Bredow, near Stettin (now Szczecin) in the Kingdom of Prussia. He was taught at Stettin in the Marienstiftsgymnasium by the polymath Hermann Grassmann, from whom he learned Sanskrit, completing his abitur in 1873. He went on to study at the Tübingen University, where he continued his education in Sanskrit with German Indologist Rudolph von Roth, who had recently published the Sanskrit Wörterbuch, a substantial dictionary of the Sanskrit language. He completed his Ph.D. in 1876.

== Career ==
After completing his education, von Garbe spent a year in England, working in libraries and meeting Max Müller, another notable German Indologist. In 1878, he became a lecturer at the University of Königsberg, becoming a professor two years later. During this time, he published a critical edition of the Atharvaveda, a Hindu philosophical and religious text, in German, as well as several monographs, including one on Indian minerals, and another on Apastambha Dharmasutra.

From 1885 to 1887 von Garbe received a grant to continue his research in India, traveling to Varanasi, and subsequently publishing a travelogue Reiseskizzen (Travelling Sketches) which was widely read and ran to two editions. In 1887, the Royal Academy of Sciences in Berlin provided funds to extend his stay in India, and in return he donated several Sanskrit texts to their collections.

Returning to Königsberg, he published his best known work, Samkhya Philosophie, a text on the Indian philosophical school, Samkhya, along with several translations and commentaries on related texts. The text was published in English in 1892, and resulted his being appointed a professor at the University of Königsberg in 1894.

In 1895, following the death of his mentor, Rudolph von Roth, von Garbe took over von Roth's position as chair of Sanskrit and comparative religious studies at Tübingen University, continuing to publish commentaries and translations of Indian philosophical texts, including a translation of the Bhagavad Gita. In 1908 he was appointed the Rector of Tübingen University.

Garbe mentored several students who also went on to study Indian religion and philosophy, including Rudolf Otto.

== Awards and honors ==
- 1909 Cross of Honour of the Order of the Württemberg Crown
- 1926 Honorary diploma of the Faculty of Philosophy, Tübingen University

== Personal life ==
von Garbe married Anna Wichert in 1887, and they had three children: a son and two daughters. He died at the age of 70, in Tübingen.

== Publications ==
- von Garbe, Vaitâna sûtra: das ritual des Atharvaveda (1878)
- von Garbe, Die indischen Mineralien: ihre Namen und die ihnen zugeschriebenen Kräfte (repr. Gerstenberg, 1974)
- von Garbe, Indien and das Christentum: eine untersuchung der religions-geschichtlichen zusammenhänge (1914)
- von Garbe, Die Sâmkhya-Philosophie: eine Darstellung des indischen Rationalismus (1917)
- von Garbe, “Die” Bhagavadgītā (1921)
