= Sarvārthasiddhi =

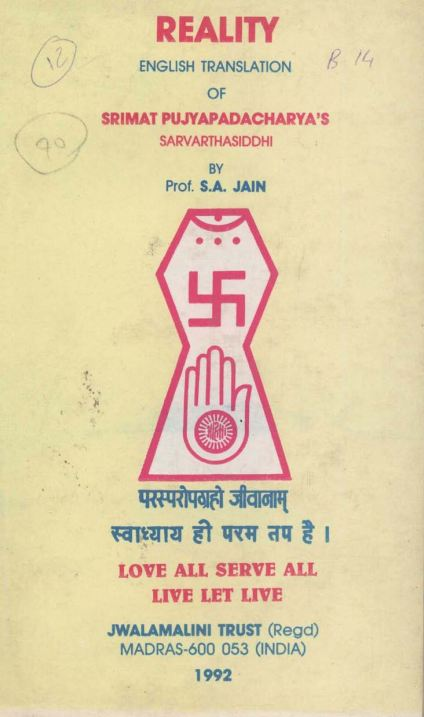
- English translation of the Sarvārthasiddhi

Information
- Religion: Jainism
- Author: Pujyapada
- Language: Sanskrit
- Period: 464 - 524 CE

Sarvārthasiddhi is a famous Jain text authored by Ācārya Pujyapada. It is the oldest extant commentary on Ācārya Umaswami's Tattvārthasūtra (another famous Jain text). Traditionally though, the oldest commentary on the Tattvārthasūtra is the Gandhahastimahābhāṣya. A commentary is a word-by-word or line-by-line explication of a text.

== Author ==
Ācārya Pujyapada, the author of Sarvārthasiddhi was a famous Digambara monk. Pujyapada was a poet, grammarian, philosopher and a profound scholar of Ayurveda.

== Content ==
The author begins with an explanation of the invocation of the Tattvārthasūtra. The ten chapters of Sarvārthasiddhi are:

1. Faith and Knowledge
2. The Category of the Living
3. The Lower World and the Middle World
4. The Celestial Beings
5. The Category of the Non-Living
6. Influx of Karma
7. The Five Vows
8. Bondage of Karma
9. Stoppage and Shedding of Karma
10. Liberation

In the text, Dāna (charity) is defined as the act of giving one's wealth to another for mutual benefit.

== English translation ==
Prof. S. A. Jain translated the Sarvārthasiddhi in English language. In the preface to his book, he wrote:

Shri Pujyapada’s Sarvārthasiddhi has exercised a great fascination on my mind ever since I commenced the study of this great work. Very few works of the world’s literature have inspired me to the same extent or have provided equally satisfactory answers to the world’s riddles, which have perplexed the greatest thinkers of all ages. No philosophical work that I know of treats of the great issues that confront humanity with the same simplicity, charm, ease and freedom.
