= Karanthai =

Pair of villages in Tamil Nadu, India

- Country: India
- State: Tamil Nadu
- District: Thiruvannamalai

Thirupanamoor and Karanthai are twin villages about 19 km from Kanchipuram. They host Jain temples containing historical inscriptions. There is a population of local Jains in these and nearby villages.

Karanthai has a complex of well known Jain temples. This was once a site where Jain munis resided, and hence it is termed Munigiri. This is also the site associated with famed Jain logician Acharya Akalanka (720-780), and hence is also called Akalankabasti.

A panchakalyanaka was conducted there in 1991 and in 2017 to install new Jain images.

The Karanthai complex has Vijayanagar period murals.

== See also ==
- Jainism in Tamil Nadu
