= Aptamimamsa =

Jain text composed by Acharya Samantabhadra

Āpta-mīmāṁsā

Information
- Religion: Jainism
- Author: Acharya Samantabhadra
- Language: Sanskrit
- Period: 2nd Century CE

Aptamimamsa (also Devāgamastotra) is a Jain text composed by Acharya Samantabhadra, a Jain acharya said to have lived about the latter part of the second century AD. Āptamīmāṁsā is a treatise of 114 verses which discusses the Jaina view of Reality, starting with the concept of omniscience (Kevala Jnana) and the attributes of the Omniscient.

== Content ==
The English translation of the first verse is:

Attendance of the heavenly beings, movement in the sky, waving of the flywhisks (cāmara) and other symbols of majesty are found even in jugglers; it is not owing to these that thou are great [supreme preacher (guru), worthy of adoration (stutya) and Omniscient (sarvajña or āpta)].

In Verse 91 acharya asserts that both fate and human-effort are jointly responsible for desirable and undesirable effects.

In Verse 98 acharya propounds that bondage (bandha) is caused due to ignorance 'accompanied' by delusion (moha), and bondage is not caused due to ignorance 'not accompanied' by delusion (moha).

== Jaina Logic ==
Two important concepts, particular to the Jaina logic, are that of syādvāda and anekāntavāda. These have been discussed comprehensively in Aptamimamsa.

=== Syādvāda ===
Syādvāda is the doctrine of conditional predications. Highlighting the indispensability of syādvāda, Āchārya Samantabhadra asserts:

Affirmation, when not in conflict with negation, yields the desired result of describing truly an object of knowledge. Only when affirmation and negation are juxtaposed in mutually non-conflicting situation, one is able to decide whether to accept or reject the assertion. This is how the doctrine of conditional predications (syādvāda) establishes the truth.

— Āptamīmāṁsā (Verse 113)

According to the Jains, Syādvāda and kevalajñāna (omniscience) are the foundational facts of knowledge. In this regard, Āchārya Samantabhadra writes:

Syādvāda, the doctrine of conditional predications, and kevalajñāna (omniscience), are both illuminators of the substances of reality. The difference between the two is that while kevalajñāna illumines directly, syādvāda illumines indirectly. Anything which is not illuminated or expressed by the two is not a substance of reality and hence a non-substance (avastu).

— Āptamīmāṁsā (Verse 105)

=== Anekāntavāda ===
Anekāntavāda means non-absolutism. In Jainism, a thing is supposed to have infinite-fold characteristics or properties. Therefore, the basic thesis in Jainism is the non-one-sided (anekānta) nature of reality. According to Āchārya Samantabhadra:

The nature of reality is such that it can be predicated only through a sentence that incorporates both the affirmation ('that is' – tat) and negation ('that is not' – atat), depending on the point of view. (In case a sentence predicates affirmation, affirmation is the primary theme and negation is present but as a secondary theme; in case a sentence predicates negation, negation is the primary theme and affirmation is present but as a secondary theme.) A predication that takes the absolutist view of either affirmation or negation is not true. And how can one describe the nature of reality through such a false sentence?

— Āptamīmāṁsā (Verse 110)

== Sources ==
- Ghoshal, Saratchandra (2002), Āpta-mīmāṁsā of Āchārya Samantabhadra, Bharatiya Jnanpith, ISBN 9788126307241
- Jain, Vijay K (1 January 2016). Ācārya Samantabhadra's Aptamimamsa (Devāgamastotra). Vikalpa Printers. ISBN 9788190363983.
- Dr. Gokulchandra Jain (2015). Samantabhadrabhāratī (1st ed.). Budhānā, Muzaffarnagar (U.P.): Achārya Shāntisāgar Chani Smriti Granthmala. ISBN 978-81-90468879.
- Champat Rai Jain (1917). The Ratna-karanda-sravakachara (The Householder's Dharma). Arrah, India: Central Jaina Publishing House.
