= Samantabhadra (Jain monk) =

2nd-century CE Indian Jain monk

Acharya Samantabhadra
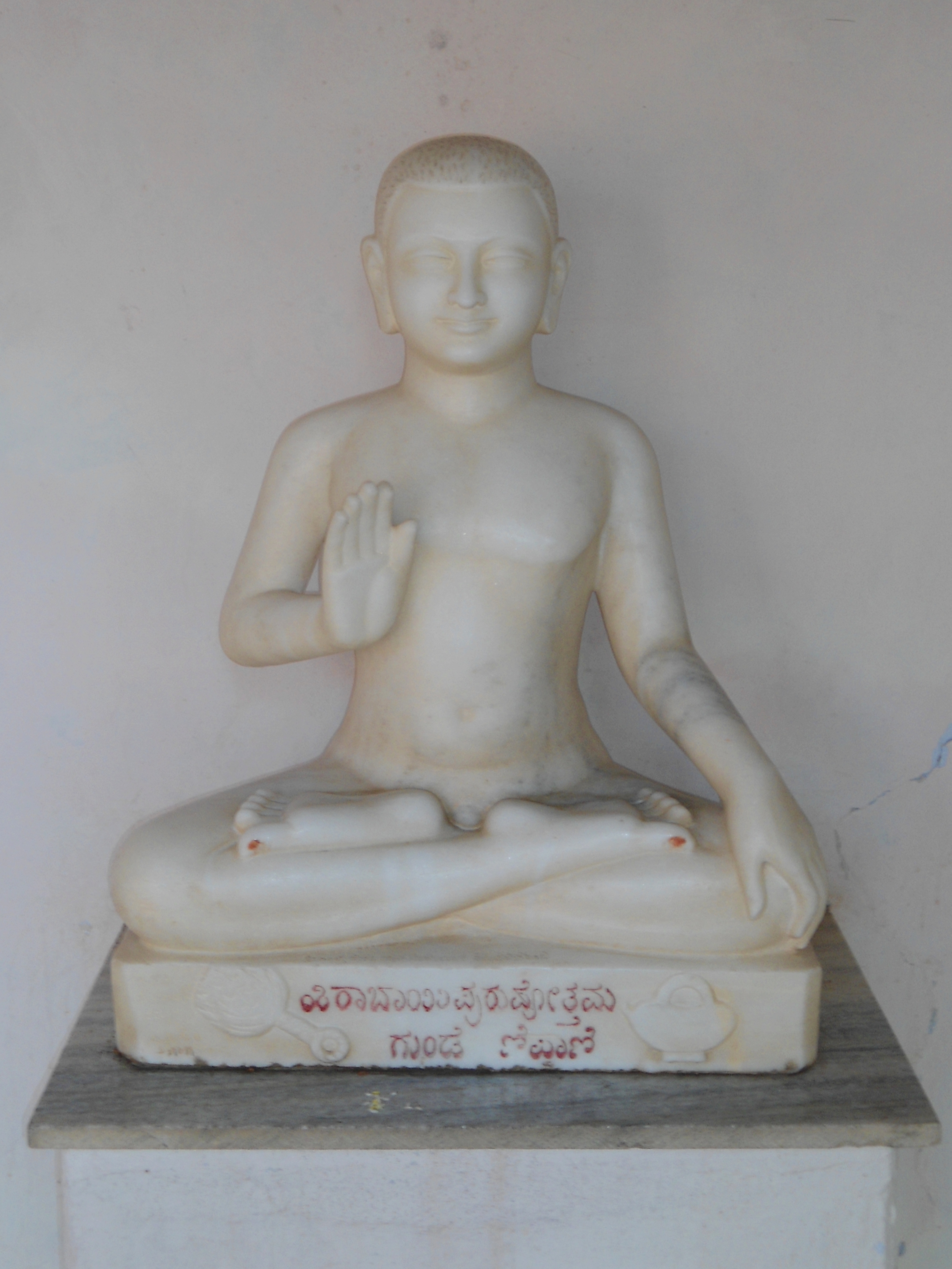

Personal life
- Born: 2nd century CE
- Notable work(s): Āpta-mīmāṁsā, Jinaśatakam

Religious life
- Religion: Jainism
- Sect: Digambara

Samantabhadra was a Jain ācārya (head of the monastic order) who lived about the later part of the second century CE. He was a proponent of the Jaina doctrine of Anekāntavāda. The Ratnakaranda śrāvakācāra is the most popular work of Samantabhadra. Samantabhadra lived after Umaswami but before Pujyapada.

== Life ==
Samantabhadra is said to have lived from 150 to 250 CE. He was from southern India during the era of the Cholas. He was a poet, logician, eulogist and an accomplished linguist. He is credited with spreading Jainism in southern India.

In the early stages of his asceticism, Samantabhadra was afflicted with a disease known as bhasmaka (a condition of insatiable hunger). Because Digambara monks do not eat more than once a day, he endured great pain. Eventually, he sought permission from his preceptor to undertake the vow of Sallekhana. The preceptor refused and instructed him to leave monasticism and have the disease treated. After being cured, he rejoined the monastic order and became a great Jaina ācārya.

== Thought ==
Samantabhadra affirmed Kundakunda's theory of the two nayas - vyavahāranaya (‘mundane') and niścayanaya (ultimate, omniscient). He argued however that the mundane view is not false, but is only a relative form of knowledge mediated by language and concepts, while the ultimate view is an immediate form of direct knowledge. Samantabhadra also developed further the Jaina theory of syādvāda.

== Works ==
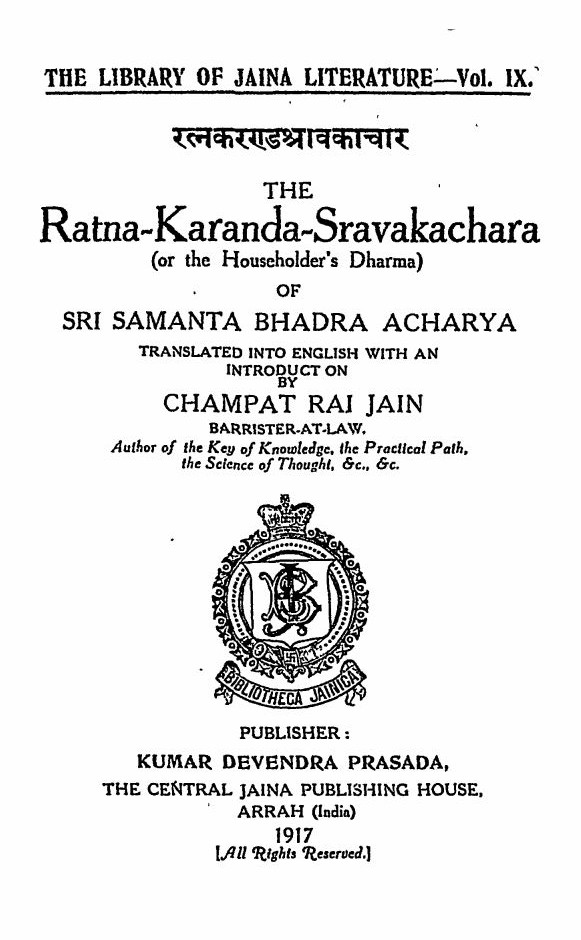
English translation of the Ratnakaranda śrāvakācāra (1917) by Champat Rai Jain

Jaina texts authored by Ācārya Samantabhadra include:

- Ratnakaranda śrāvakācāra (150 verses)- The Ratnakaranda śrāvakācāra discusses the conduct of a Śrāvaka (Jain laity) in detail.
- Gandhahastimahabhasya, a monumental commentary on the Tattvartha Sutra. The Gandhahastimahābhāṣya, with the exception of its Maṅgalācaraṇa (salutation to the deity), is extant now. The Maṅgalācaraṇa is known as the 'Devāgama stotra' or Āpta-mīmāṁsā.
- Āpta-mīmāṁsā- A treatise of 114 verses, it discusses the Jaina concept of omniscience and the attributes of the Omniscient.
- Svayambhūstotra (fifth century CE) - A Sanskrit adoration of The Twenty-four Tīrthaṅkaras - 143 verses. It was later translated by Dhyanatray (1676-1726) in Agra.
- Yuktyanuśāsana- Sixty-four verses in praise of Tīrthaṅkara Vardhamāna Mahāvīra.
- Jinaśatakam (Stutividyā)(116 verses)- Poetical work written in Sanskrit in praise of twenty-four Jinas.
- Tattvānuśāsana

== Praise ==
Jinasena, in his celebrated work, Ādi purāṇa praises the Samantabhadra as

Acharya Samantrabhadra’s glory reigned supreme among all poets, scholars, disputants, and preachers; he was like a jewel on their heads.

== See also ==
- Devardhigani Kshamashraman
- Hemachandra
- Hiravijaya
