= Gunasthana =

Fourteen stages of spiritual development in Jainism

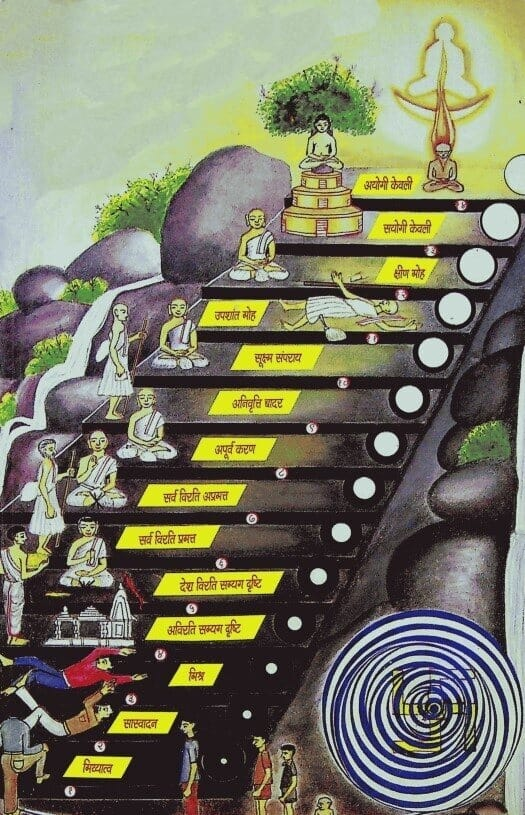
An Illustraious Depiction of 14 Gunshtanakas

Guṇasthāna (Sanskrit: "levels of virtue") are the fourteen stages of spiritual development and growth through which a soul gradually passes before it attains moksha (liberation). According to Jainism, it is a state of soul from a complete dependence on karma to the state of complete dissociation from it. Here the word virtue does not mean an ordinary moral quality, but it stands for the nature of soul—knowledge, belief and conduct.

== Overview ==
According to the Sarvārthasiddhi, a commentary by Pūjyapāda Devanandi which provides an exegesis of the Tattvartha Sutra (chapter 9), the 14 Guṇasthānas (also known as the Doctrine of the 14 Stages of Spiritual Development) are:

1. mithyā-dṛṣṭi "deluded world-view"
2. sāsvādana "lingering enlightened world-view" or "passing taste"
3. samyak-mithyātva "combination of enlightened and deluded world-view" (soul’s ascent to the enlightened world-view)
4. samyag-dṛṣṭi "enlightened world-view without self-restraint"
5. deśa-virata "enlightened world-view with partial self-restraint but with partial laxity"
6. sarva-virata "enlightened world-view with complete self-restraint free of laxity"
7. apramatta-virata "complete self-restraint free of laxity" (deep meditation becomes possible)
8. apūrva-karaṇa "complete self-restraint with gross passions with novel experiences"
9. anivṛtti-karaṇa "complete self-restraint with gross passions and similar but progressively purer experiences"
10. sūkṣma-sāmparāya "complete self-restraint with subtle flickering greed"
11. upaśānta-kaṣāya "complete self-restraint with suppressed passions"
12. kṣīṇa-moha "complete self-restraint with eliminated passions"
13. sayoga-kevalī "omniscience accompanied by mental, verbal and physical activity"
14. ayoga-kevalī "omniscience with no activity"

== Classification ==
The fourteen Gunasthāna represents the soul's gradual manifestation of the innate qualities of knowledge, belief and conduct in a more and more perfect form. Following are the stages of spiritual development: The first four are concerned with Right Belief (Rationality in perception)

- 1. Mithyātva (Delusion)
- 2. Sasādana
- 3. Misradrsti (Mixed belief)
- 4. Avirata samyagdrsti (Vowless right belief)

The next one is about Minor Vows i.e. Commencement of Right conduct

- 5. Deśavirata (The stage of partial self-control)

The rest are about Right conduct: Mahavratas (Major Vows)

- 6. Pramattasamyata (Slightly imperfect vows)
- 7. Apramatta samyata (Perfect vows)
- 8. Apūrvakaraņa (New thought-activity)
- 9. Anivāttibādara-sāmparāya (Advanced thought-activity)
- 10. Sukshma samparaya (Slightest delusion)
- 11. Upaśānta-kasāya (Subsided delusion)
- 12. Ksīna kasāya (Destroyed delusion)
- 13. Sayoga kevali (Kevala Jnana with vibration)
- 14. Ayoga kevali (Moksha)

== The Fourteen stages ==
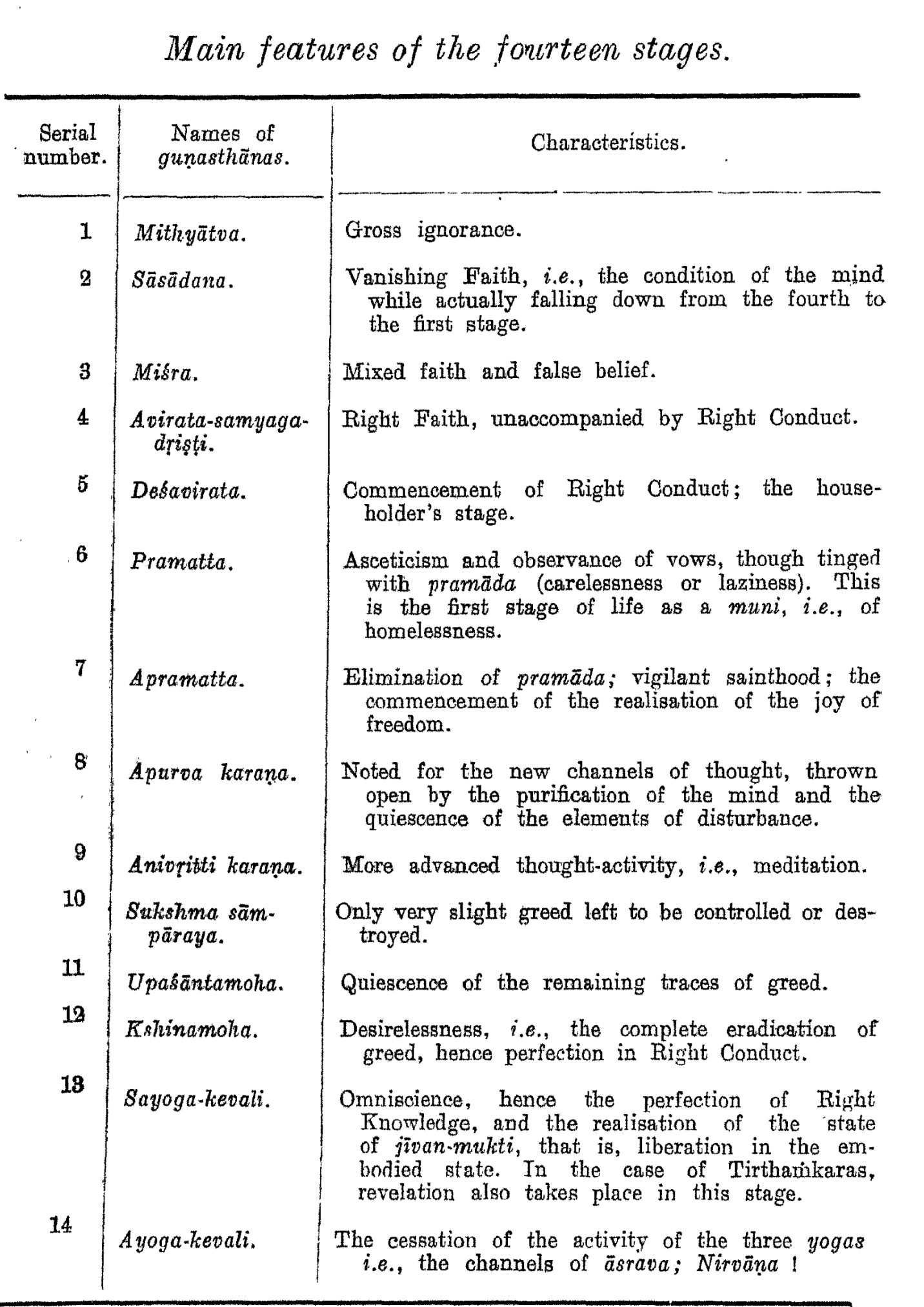
Fourteen stages on the path to liberation

Head	Gunasthāna	Meaning
Belief (Rationality in perception)	1. Mithyātva	The stage of wrong believer (gross ignorance). If at this stage, a person meditates on his existence, there is a temporary suspension of the following: The first three energies of darsanamohaniya karma (which obstructs right belief); 1. mithyātva 2. samyaga mithyātva 3. samyak prakriti; The anantdnubandhi (intensest) type of anger, pride, deceit and greed
Belief (Rationality in perception)	2. Sasādana	This gunasthāna represents the mental state of the soul in the process or act of falling from right faith. Here sā means "with" and sādana means "exhausted", hence that which is characterised by exhausted faith.
Belief (Rationality in perception)	3. Misradrsti	Misra literally means mixed. At this stage, a person hovers between certainty and doubt on Right belief.
Belief (Rationality in perception)	4. Avirata samyagdrsti	Vowless Right Belief - When doubts of an individual are removed, he/she reaches this stage and becomes a samyagdrishti (true believer)
Commencement of Right conduct (Śrāvaka)	5. Deśavirata	Deśa means partial and virata means vow i.e. observance of the partial vows in pursuit of Right conduct.
Right conduct (Major Vows)	6. Pramattasamyata	First step of life as a Jain muni (monk). The stage of complete self-discipline, although sometimes brought into wavering through negligence.
Right conduct (Major Vows)	7. Apramatta samyata	Perfect vows
Right conduct (Major Vows)	8. Apūrvakaraņa	New thought-activity. The stage of one in whom the passions are still occurring in a gross form.
Right conduct (Major Vows)	9. Anivāttibādara-sāmparāya	The stage of one who practices the process called annivrtti karaņa and in whom however the passions are still occurring
Right conduct (Major Vows)	10.Sukshma sāmprāya	Slightest delusion. The stage of one in whom the passions occur in a subtle form.
Right conduct (Major Vows)	11.Upaśānta-kasāya	Subsided delusion. The stage of one who has suppressed every passion but still does not possess omniscience.
Right conduct (Major Vows)	12.Ksīna kasāya	Destroyed delusion. The stage of who has annihilated every passion but does not yet possess omniscience.
Right conduct (Major Vows)	13.Sayoga kevali	Omniscience with vibration. Sa means "with" and yoga refers to the three channels of activity, i.e., mind, speech and body. Kevali is a term used to refer the omniscient beings (arihantas). This stage is characterised by the destruction of all inimical (ghātiā) karmas and attainment of omniscience.
Right conduct (Major Vows)	14.Ayoga kevali	The stage of omniscience without any activity. This is the last stage on the Path, and is followed by the soul's destruction of the aghātiā karmas. Those who pass this stage are called siddha and become fully established in Right Faith, Right Knowledge and Right Conduct.

About the 12th stage it is mentioned in Jain text, Gommatsāra Jīvakanda:

That possessionless saint (Nirgrantha), all of whose deluding, passions (Moha Kashaya) are destroyed, and whose thought is clear like the water kept in a pure vessel of crystal Jewel is said by the non-attached (Conquerors) (to be in the 12th stage of) destroyed-delusion, or delusionless (Kshina Kashaya).

— Gommatsāra (62)

== The destruction of causes of bondage ==
The whole scheme of gunasthana in Jain philosophy is devised in a logical order according to the principle of decreasing sinfulness and increasing purity. At the first stage, all the five causes of bondage—Irrational beliefs (mithyatva), non-restraint (avirati), carelessness (pramada), passions (kashaya) and activities of mind, speech and body (yoga)—are in full operation. Irrational beliefs (mithyatva) are partially suppressed in the second and third stages, and are eliminated in the fourth stage. In stages five and six, non-restraint (avirati) is gradually eliminated in stages. From the seventh stage onwards, carelessness is removed and only passions and activity exercise their influence. From the eleventh to the thirteenth all the passions are eliminated and only activity is present. On the last stage, there is no activity, hence no binding of karma.

== The destruction of karmas ==
Out of the four ghatiya karmas, darsana mohiniya karma (perception deluding karma) is destroyed first in the fourth stage of gunasthana. Caritra mohiniya karma (conduct deluding karma) is destroyed next in the twelfth gunasthana. The remaining three ghatiya karmas (knowledge obstructing karma, perception obstructing karma and energy obstructing karma) are destroyed in the 13th stage and the rest four aghatiya karmas (life-span determining, body determining, status determining and feeling producing karmas) are destroyed in the 14th or the last stage of gunasthana.

== See also ==
- Types of Karma
- Causes of Karma
- Fruits of the noble path
