= Causes of karma in Jainism =

One of the seven truths or fundamental principles (tattva) of Jainism

The karmic process in Jainism is based on seven truths or fundamental principles (tattva) of Jainism which explain the human predicament. Out of those, four—influx (āsrava), bondage (bandha), stoppage (saṃvara) and release (nirjarā)—pertain to the karmic process. Karma gets bound to the soul on account of two processes:

- āsrava – Influx of karmas, and
- bandha – bondage or sticking of karmas to consciousness

== Influx of Karma ==
The āsrava, that is, the influx of karma occurs when the karmic particles are attracted to the soul on account of vibrations created by activities of mind, speech and body. Tattvārthasūtra, 6:1–2 states: "The activities of body, speech and mind is called yoga. This three-fold action results in āsrava or influx of karma." The karmic inflow on account of yoga driven by passions and emotions cause a long term inflow of karma prolonging the cycle of reincarnations. On the other hand, the karmic inflows on account of actions that are not driven by passions and emotions have only a transient, short-lived karmic effect.

=== Causes of influx ===
Karmic particles are attracted to the consciousness by a combination of the following factors pertaining to action—instrumentality, process, modality and motivation Thus, the karmas are attracted and bound on account of combination any element of the following four factors:

- the instrumentality of the actions, that is, either through:
  - body – physical action,
  - speech – verbal action, or
  - mind – mental action
- the process of action which consists of:
  - decision or plan to act,
  - making preparations for the act, like, collecting necessary materials, or
  - actually beginning of the action
- the modality of action, that consists of:
  - the act carried out by self, or
  - instigating someone else to carry out the act, or
  - giving approval or endorsing the act.
- the motivation for action. This includes any of the following negative emotions that motivates the action:
  - Anger
  - Greed
  - Pride
  - Manipulation or deceit

With a combination of any of the elements of the above four factors, there are 108 ways with which the karmas can be attracted to the soul. Even a silent assent or endorsements of acts of violence done by someone else far away, carries karmic consequences for the soul. Hence, the scriptures advice carefulness in actions, awareness of the world, and purity in thoughts as a means to avoid the influx of karmas.

== Bondage of karmas ==
The karmas have effect only when they are bound to the consciousness. This binding of the karma to the consciousness is called bandha (bondage). However, the yoga or the activities alone do not produce bondage. Out of the many causes of bondage, passion is considered as the main cause of bondage. The karmas are literally bound on account of the stickiness of the soul due to existence of various passions or mental dispositions. The passions like anger, pride, deceit and greed are called sticky (kasayas) because they act like glue in making karmic particles stick to the soul resulting in bandha. Hence the ancient Jain texts, such as Daśavaikālika sūtra. talk of subduing these negative emotions:

When he wishes that which is good for him, he should get rid of the four fault—anger, pride, deceit and greed—which increase the evil. Anger and pride when not suppressed, and deceit and greed when arising: all these four black passions water the roots of re-birth.

—Daśavaikālika sūtra, 8:36–39

=== Causes of bondage ===
According to Tattvārthasūtra, the causes of karmic bondage—in the order they are required to be eliminated by a soul for spiritual progress—are:

- Mithyātva (Irrationality and a deluded world view) – The deluded world view is the misunderstanding as to how this world really functions on account of one-sided perspectives, perverse viewpoints, irrational scepticism, pointless generalisations and ignorance.
- Avirati (non-restraint or a vowless life) – The second cause of bondage, avirati is the inability to refrain voluntarily from the evil actions, that harms oneself and others. The state of avirati can only be overcome by observing the minor vows of a layman.
- Pramāda (carelessness and laxity of conduct) – This third cause of bondage consists of absentmindedness, lack of enthusiasm towards acquiring merit and spiritual growth, and improper actions of mind, body and speech without any regard to oneself or others.
- Kaṣāya (passions or negative emotions) – The four passions—anger, pride, deceit and greed—are the primary reason for the attachment of the karmas to the soul. They keep the soul immersed in the darkness of delusion leading to deluded conduct and unending cycles of reincarnations.
- Yoga (activities of mind, speech and body) – The threefold activities of mind, body and speech attract and bind the karmas when such actions are influenced by passions.

Each cause presupposes the existence of the next cause, but the next cause does not necessarily presuppose the existence of the previous cause. A soul is able to advances on the spiritual ladder called guṇasthāna, only when it is able to eliminate the above causes of bondage one by one. Duration and intensity of the karmic bond are determined by "Kaṣāya" and type and quantity of the karmas bound depends on yoga.

== Causes of different types of karmas ==
Chapter VI of Tattvārthasūtra provides a detailed description of various causes for various types of karmas. According to Jain texts, there are eight main types of karma—jñānavāraṇa (Knowledge obscuring karma), darśanāvaraṇa (perception obscuring karma) mohanīya (deluding karma), antarāya (obstacles creating karma), vedanīya (feeling producing karma), nāma (body determining karma), āyu (life span determining karma) and "gotra" (status determining karma).

=== Causes of knowledge obscuring and perception obscuring karmas ===
Jñānavāraṇa and darśanāvaraṇa karma are knowledge obscuring and perception obscuring. They are caused by:

1. harbouring a feeling of jealousy towards knowledge or perception, towards a possessor of it and towards a means of it.
2. Wilful concealment of knowledge or perception
3. Ungenerosity as to knowledge
4. Obstruction of knowledge or perception to others
5. Denial of receipt of knowledge
6. False accusation or misrepresentation

=== Causes of feeling producing karma ===
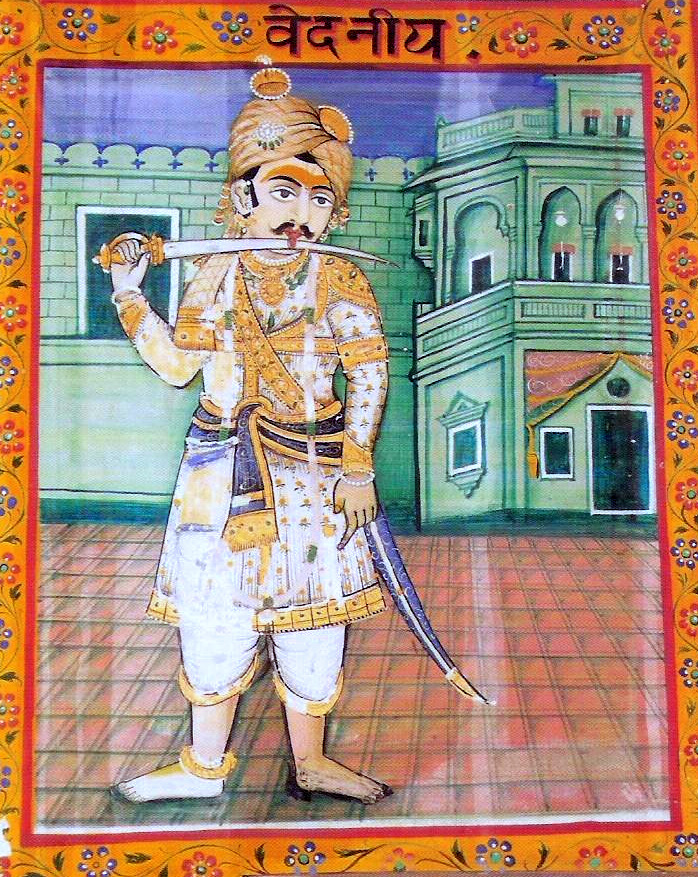
Vediniya karma: Pain and Pleasure is induced on account of licking honey from the sword

Vedanīya, feeling producing karmas can be of two types: sātāvedanīya i.e. pleasant and asātāvedanīya i.e. unpleasant feeling producing karmas.

==== Causes of asātāvedanīya karma ====
Asātāvedanīya karma is bound on account of causing to other or oneself the following:

1. External or an internal pain
2. To feel troubled and worried on having been deprived of the company of a well-wisher
3. Experience of acute distress or heart burning on account of insult or insulting others
4. To enjoy or wallow in misery, to weep and wail
5. Injuring self or others
6. Lamenting on recalling the merits of a departed one

==== Causes of sātāvedanīya karma ====
Sātāvedanīya karma is bound on account of causing to other or oneself the following:

1. Harbouring a feeling of compassion towards all the living
2. Leading a religious life i.e. practice of minor vows or anuvrata by householder and mahavrata by monks and ascetics
3. Donation and charity with humility
4. Self restraint or proper attentiveness towards disciplined life even if it is tinged with some attachment
5. Forbearance and forgiveness
6. Inculcating purity by suppressing the tendency towards greed and the like defilements

=== Causes of deluding karmas ===
Mohanīya karmas produce a delusion in a soul i.e. the soul is not able to distinguish between right and wrong. They are of two subtypes—Darśana-mohanīya (Perception delusion) and cāritra-mohanīya (conduct deluding) karmas.

==== Causes of Darśana-mohanīya ====
1. Speaking ill of the omniscient and holders of true knowledge
2. Speaking ill of the scripture i.e. a jealous intellect leveling false charges against the scripture (e.g. Saying that this scripture is useless because it is composed in Prakrit which is a language of the illiterate alternatively, because it is composed in a complication ridden language of the pedant or that it contains a futile and bothersome description of the various vows, regulations, expiations etc.)
3. Speaking ill of the religious order or levelling false charges against the religious order composed of four divisions viz. monks, nuns, laymen, laywomen (e.g. saying that these monks unnecessarily take the trouble of observing vows, regulations etc., since monkhood is in fact an impossibility nor is it conducive to a wholesome result, or saying about the laymen that they undertake no cultured performances like bath, donation etc., nor do they lead a life of purity.)
4. Speaking ill of the religion
5. Speaking ill of the deities or denigrating them

==== Causes of Cāritra-mohanīya karmas ====
1. To produce a kasaya (passions) in oneself or in others and to undertake unworthwhile acts under the influence of a kasaya
2. To ridicule the true religion, to make fun of a poor or helpless person, to develop the habit of frivolous joking
3. Indulging in various recreations evincing disinclination towards the proper moral restrains like vows and regulations
4. To cause worry to others, to disturb someone in one's rest and to keep the company of petty persons
5. To maintain a sorrowful demeanour and to arouse a feeling of sorrow in others
6. To feel afraid and to frighten others
7. To despise a beneficial act and a beneficial general conduct
8. A habit for cheating and finding fault with others
9. To nourish mental impressions of various sexual feelings

=== The causes of lifespan determining karmas ===
The āyu karmas are the life span determining karmas and they determine the next destiny or reincarnation of a soul. Accordingly, as per the next reincarnations lifespan determined, a soul takes birth in either hell, heaven, animal kingdom or as a human (this list is not exhaustive).

==== Causes of the Narakayus karma or birth in hells ====
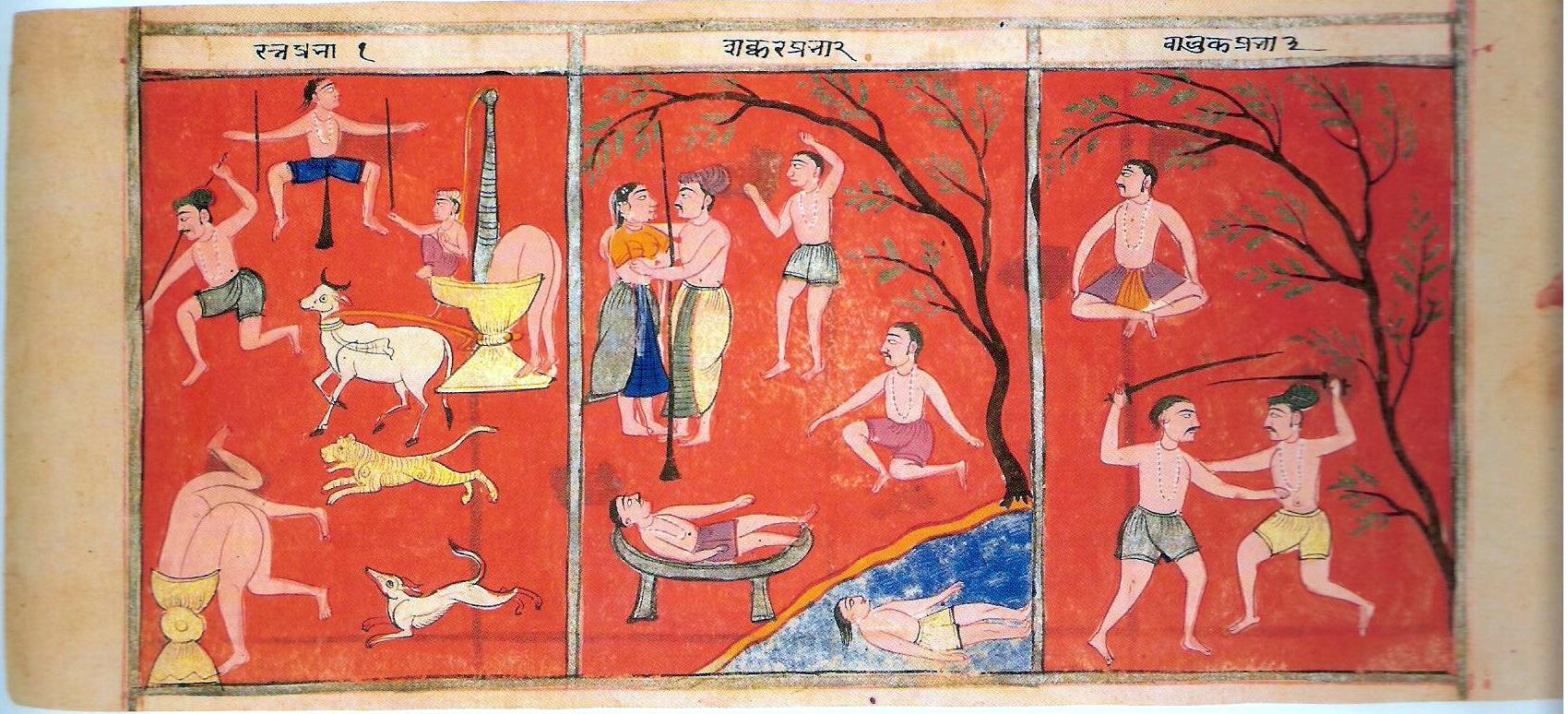
Torture in Hells: Ratna prabha, Sharkara prabha and Valuka prabha.

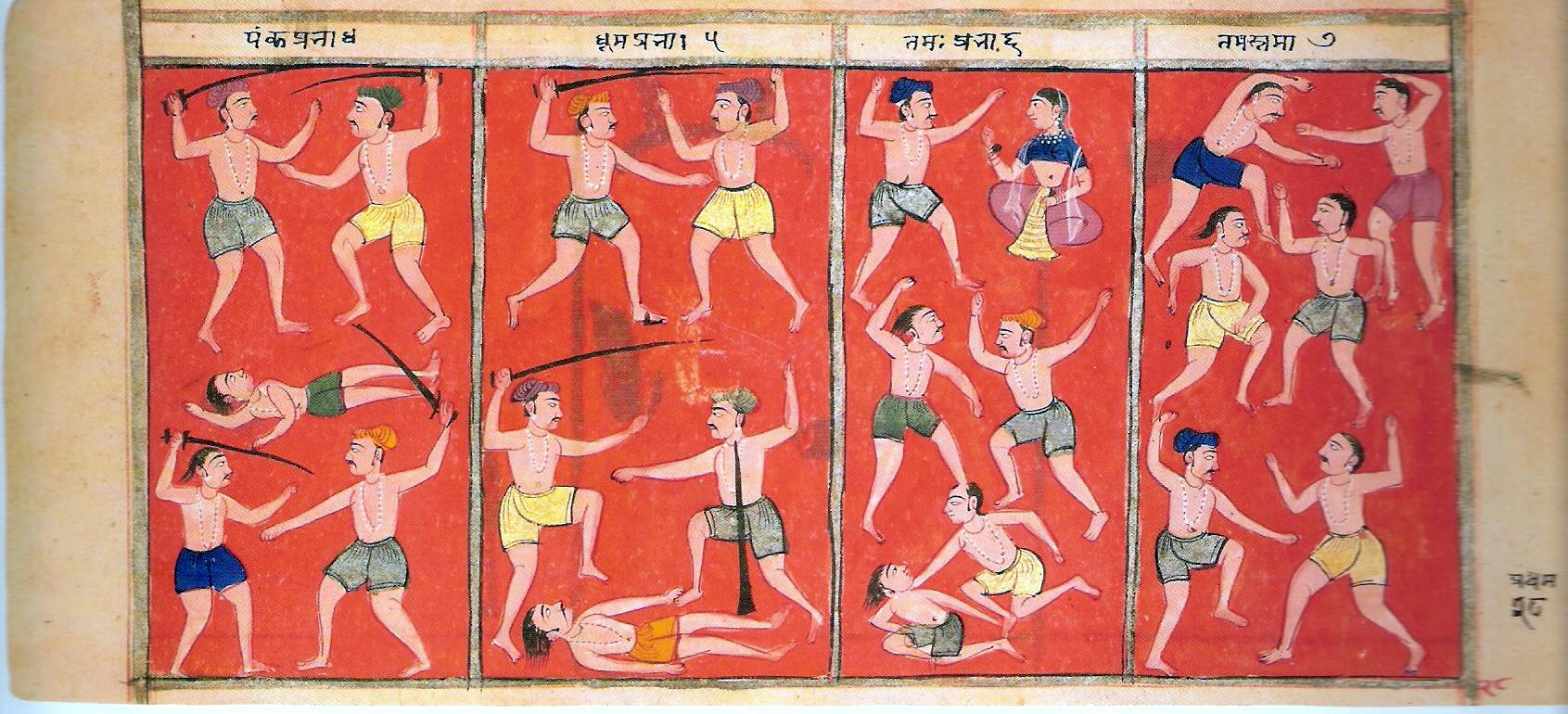
Torture in Hells: Panka prabha, Dhuma prabha, Tamaha prabha and Mahatamaha prabha

Following reasons result in birth in naraka or hells:

1. Killing or causing pain with intense passion
2. Excessive attachment to things and worldly pleasure with constantly indulging in cruel and violent acts.
3. Vowless and unrestrained life

==== Causes of the Tiryagayus karma or birth as animals ====
Following actions conducted with deceit lead to births animals, plants or microbes:

1. Preaching religion to introduce sheer falsity
2. Propagate religion with a selfish motive
3. Vowless and unrestrained life

==== Causes of Manusyayus karma or birth as human ====
1. To reduce the tendency to inflict injury and that to accumulate possession.
2. To exhibit softness and simplicity.
3. Vowless and unrestrained life
4. Helping the needy (poor, friends, old peoples, blind and handicaps etc.)
5. Doing charity
6. Forgiveness
7. To respect humans

==== Causes of the Devayus karma or birth in Heavens ====
1. Having a disciplined and restrained life yet accompanied by some attachment
2. Partial practice of vows like non-violence, etc.
3. Refraining from evil acts but out of compulsion from external factors or for imitating others
4. Undergoing childish penances like fasting and austerities without understanding

Practicing vows and austerities normally leads to destruction of karmas and of attainment of moksa or liberation, but in above cases leads to merit and birth in heavens as demi-gods for a long but finite period of time.

=== Causes of body determining karma ===
The nāma karmas or body determining karmas are of two types—asubha and subha nama karmas i.e. auspicious and inauspicious karmas. Their causes are:

1. Crooked and misleading actions (pertaining to mind, speech and body) causes inflow of inauspicious nāma karma
2. The opposite of the above—straightforwardness and genuine behaviour—causes inflow of auspicious nāma karma.
3. Sixteen dispositions that cause rebirth as a Tīrthaṅkara on account of Tīrthaṅkara–nāma-karma:
  1. purity of worldview,
  2. humility,
  3. non-violation of vows and abstinences,
  4. persistent cultivation of knowledge,
  5. ever present fear of worldly existence,
  6. charity and renunciation as per one's capacity,
  7. penance as per one's capacity,
  8. ensuring harmony and peace in the religious order particularly the order of monks,
  9. offering services to the competent and deserving persons,
  10. devotion towards Siddhas and Tīrthaṅkaras,
  11. devotion towards the preceptor,
  12. devotion towards learned monks,
  13. devotion towards scriptures,
  14. regard for compulsory duties,
  15. to cultivate and honour the path of mokṣa,
  16. feeling of unattached affection towards the co-religionists.

=== Causes of Status determining ===
The gotra karma or status determining karma is of two types:

1. Nicagotra karma: Praising oneself, defaming others, hiding others’ merits and finding fault in others are the causes of low status or low class.
2. Uccagotra karma: Praising others, displaying one’s own shortcomings, ignoring one’s own merit along with humility and modesty cause the inflow of high status determining karma.

=== Causes of Obstructing karma ===
The causes of inflow of obstructing or antarāya karma are—causing obstruction to others or intending to place or placing obstacles before others in their attempts towards beneficence, gain, satisfaction, comfort and power.

== See also ==
- Types of Karma
- Gunasthana
