= Pratiyogitvam =

Pratiyogitvam, a Sanskrit term, means recognizing 'difference' by noting the 'otherness' in another thing; 'difference' means 'the want of the total characteristic of one thing in another'. Differences are of three kinds: (a) 'difference existing in oneself' (svajātiya-bheda), (b) 'difference in species' (svagata-bheda), and (c) 'difference of genus' (vijātiya-bheda). These differences do not exist in Brahman who is one without a second. The Upanishads negate these differences in Brahman who is self-revealing and can be experienced when all mentations cease, what is then experienced is not nothing, for there can be no knowledge of a thing that does not exist.

== Background ==
After explaining that creation means the appearance of names and forms which cannot be parts of Brahman, for before creation they did not arise, and that one object differs from another on account of its name and form whereas Brahman is absolutely without name and form, with regard to 'non-existence', Vidyaranya in his Panchadasi (Stanza II-25) tells us:

विजातीयमसत्तत्तु न खल्वस्तीति गम्यते
नास्यातः प्रतियोगित्वं विजातीयाभ्दिदा कुतः

And about non-existence: we cannot say that it (is something that) exists. So it cannot serve as a pratiyogin. If so, how can there be vijātiya difference.

In which context, Swami Swahananda explains that to speak of 'difference' from a thing which does not exist conveys no meaning. The world is not really real so it cannot stand on the same footing. Bheda means 'difference', or 'not itself or the same but another'. Pratiyogitvam, a technical term, means recognizing 'difference' by noting the 'otherness' in another thing.

== Non-existence ==
'Non-existence' is something that appears and is later negated or contradicted; the falsehood of an appearance (Mithyatva) consists in the fact that its existence may be denied, in all the three temporal relations, in the locus or the entity where it is perceived. The illusory object is both, existent and non-existent; it appears as existent, but is yet not such an existent which remains un-contradicted in the past, present and future. Mithya, in Advaita Vedanta, is not to be understood as illusion; mithya is that which is not unreal because it appears, but is not real since later it disappears; so too is it with Maya. Gaudapada tells us that the utility of the objects seen in the waking state is contradicted by the dream state; objects have to be regarded as mithya since they have a beginning and an end.

== Pratiyogin ==
The word Pratiyogin (Sanskrit: प्रतियोगिन्) means opposing, counteracting, impeding, related or corresponding to, being or forming a counterpart of anything, equally matched, an object dependent upon another, counter-entity; it also means uninterrupted succession.

According to Madhvacharya the counter-correlate (pratiyogi) in the case of absolute negation, which is limitless, is the absolutely non-existent itself; non-existence is also called the negation whose counter-correlate is a myth. Being the counter-correlate is not an attribute which requires or presupposes the actual existence of a referent like other predications of attributes like colour; to be the counter-correlate of a negation is merely being the referent of such knowledge as would enable the formation of the idea of negation.

It is the cognition of distinctness which gives rise to an expectation about a counter-positive i.e. to a counter-correlate.

Thus, 'being' is defined as that which at all times and in all places cannot be denied or which being different from non-being, is not a false imposition or as that which at some time or other is directly and rightly felt as existing. And, difference between genera are apprehended along with counter-correlates, which are remote in space and time. Perception of Svarupa ('one's own form') and Bheda ('difference') is immediate upon an encounter with the object.

== Significance ==
In the context of Brahma Sutras (IV.1) which refers to the 'inferred entity' (Pradhana) of the Samkhyas, Shankara explains that the term, Avyakta (which is not manifest) can be applied equally to any other subtle and inscrutable thing, and does not conventionally mean any particular thing; the identity of a thing cannot be established merely from the similarity of the order of treatment unless the nature of the thing itself is recognized as identical. The Supreme Self is presented by Katha Upanishad (I.iii.10) as the master of the chariot, that is so because the experiencer can reasonably be superior to the objects of experience.

Kena Upanishad (I.5) prohibits meditation on Brahman because Brahman is beyond the range of speech and mind, and because the attribute-less Brahman cannot be an object of knowledge. Swami Swahananda in the context of 'leading' error being potent enough to give correct results states that meditation on or worship of Brahman can lead to liberation even though the form of Brahman worshipped is illusory. As long as the delusion of identifying the body with Brahman prevails, a man will not realise identity of the individual self with the Supreme self.
