= Types of Karma (Jainism) =

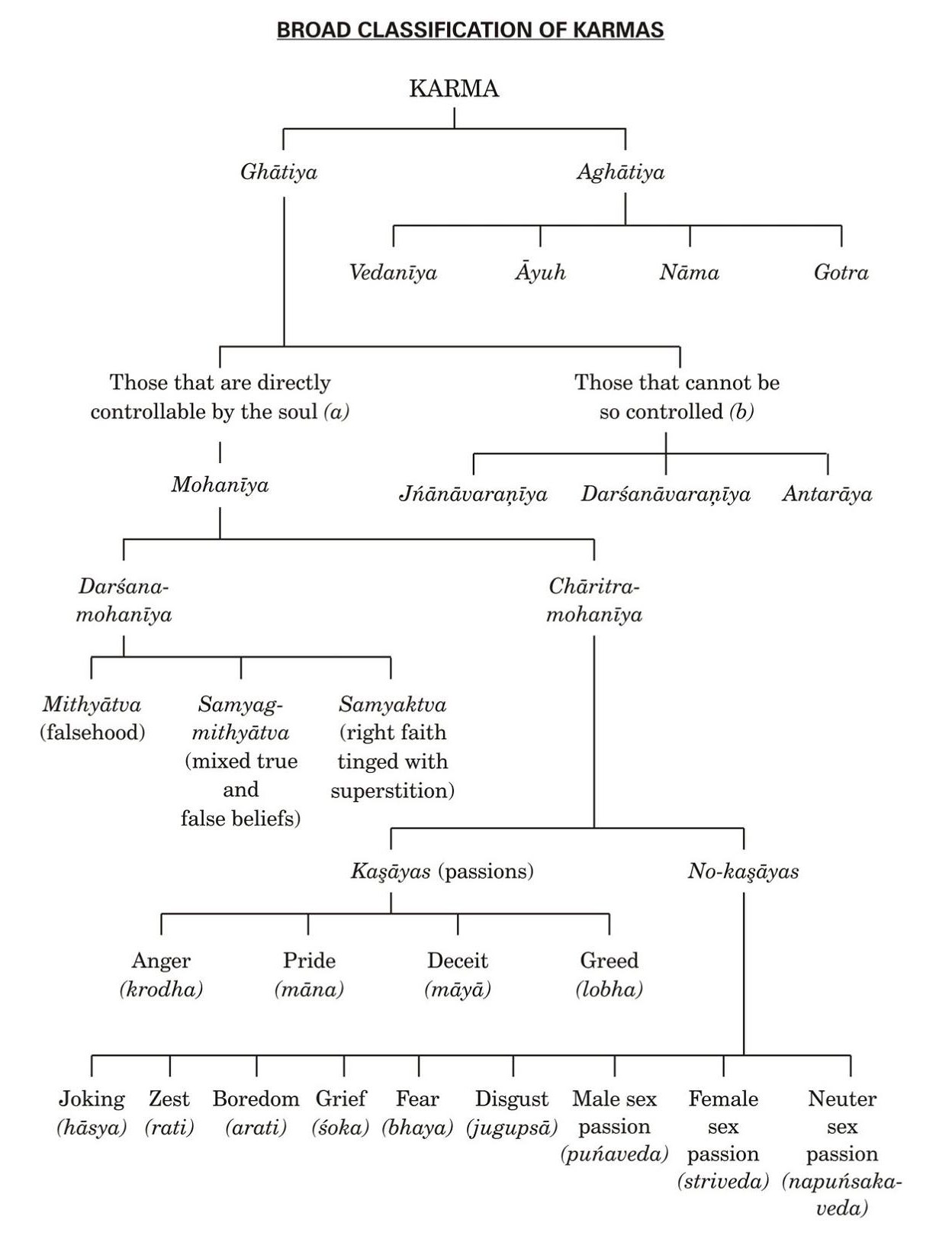
Types of Karma

In Jainism, the principle of karma relates morality to the soul's cycle through life, death and rebirth. Moral actions accrue karma, which remain in the soul throughout the cycle, until liberation is achieved.

Jains recognise eight main types of karma (Prakriti) which are categorized as either ‘harming’ or ‘non-harming’, with each category further divided into four types. The harming karmas (ghātiyā karmas) directly affect the soul powers by impeding its perception, knowledge and energy, and also bring about delusion. These harming karmas are: darśhanāvarniya (perception obscuring karma), gyanavarniya (knowledge obscuring karma), antarāay (obstacles creating karma) and mohanīya (deluding karma). The non-harming category (aghātiyā karmas) is responsible for the reborn soul's physical and mental circumstances (nāam), longevity (āayu), spiritual potential (gotra) and experience of pleasant and unpleasant sensations (vedanīya). In other terms these non-harming karmas are: nāam (body determining karma), āayu (life span determining karma), gotra (status determining karma) and vedanīya (feeling producing karma) respectively. Different types of karmas thus affect the soul in different ways, with each types having various sub-types. Tattvārthasūtra generally speaks of 148 sub-types of karmas in all. These are: 5 of gyanavaraṇa, 9 of darśhanavaraṇa, 2 of vedanīya, 28 of mohanīya 4 of āayu, 93 of naam, 2 of gotra, and 5 of antarāay.

== Ghatiya karmas ==
Ghātiyā karmas (harming karmas) directly affect the attributes of the soul. These are:

1. Knowledge-obscuring karma (Jñānāvaraṇīya karma) – These karmas obscure the knowledge attribute of the soul.
2. Perception-obscuring karma (Darśhanāvaraṇīya karma) – These karmas diminish the powers of Perception of a soul.
3. Deluding karma (Mohanīya karma) – These karmas are an instrumental cause of destruction the soul's right belief and right conduct. Of all karmas, deluding karma is the most difficult to overcome. Once this is eradicated, liberation is ensured within a few lifetimes.
4. Obstructing karma (Antarāya karma) – The fruition of these karmas creates obstructions to giving donations, obtaining gains, and enjoying things.

When ghātiyā karmas are totally destroyed, the soul attains kevala Jnana or omniscience. Liberation is guaranteed for such souls in the same lifetime as soon the aghātiyā karmas are exhausted in the due course.

gyanaverniya karma or the knowledge-obscuring karma are of five types:

1. Mati jnanavarana-karma which causes the obscuration of the knowledge, transmitted through the senses,
2. Shruta jnanavarana-karma which produces the obscuration of knowledge acquired by interpreting signs (i.e.words, writings, gestures),
3. Avadhi jnanavarana-karma which hinders transcendental knowledge of material things,
4. Manahparyaya jnanavarana-karma which hinders transcendental knowledge of the thoughts of others,
5. Kevala jnanavarana-karma which obscures the omniscience inherent in the jiva by natural disposition.

Of these, the last mentioned karma hinders omniscience altogether; the four others do not result in complete destruction of the corresponding faculties of knowledge, but often produce only greater or less disturbances.

=== Darshanavaraniya karma ===
There are four types of Darshanavarana karma (the perception-obscuring karma):

1. Chakshur darshanavarana-karma which produces the obscuration of the darsana conditional upon the eye,
2. Achakshur darshanavarana-karma which causes the obscuration of the undifferentiated cognition, conditional upon the other senses and the organ of thinking,
3. Avadhi darshanavarana-karma which causes the obscuration of the transcendental undifferentiated cognition of material things,
4. Kevala darshanavarana-karma which hinder the absolute undifferentiated cognition (the counterpart of the omniscience).

The last mentioned karma hinders completely; the three others produce under certain circumstances only a disturbance of the respective cognition faculties.

In addition to these four darshanavarana karmas there are five others which produce physio-psychological conditions in which the sense organs are not active, and which, therefore, exclude all possibility of perception. These are the five nidra karmas, (sleep karmas), namely:

1. Nidra-karma which produces a light, pleasant slumber, out of which the sleeper is already aroused by the clicking of finger nails.
2. Nidranidra-karma which produces a deep slumber, out of which the sleeper can only be awakened by being shaken violently,
3. Prachala-karma which sitting or standing upright
4. Prachalaprachala-karma which produces an exceedingly intensive sleep, that overcomes a person while walking,
5. Styanagriddhi (styanariddhi) karma which causes somnambulism, acting an unconscious state.

=== Mohaniya karman ===
Mohaniya is derived from Moha which means attachment. Mohaniya karma (deluding karma) is considered the most dangerous out of all the eight karmas since `moha' (attachment) is believed to be the root cause of all Kasayas (passions). It is also most difficult karma to destroy. If mohaniya karma is destroyed fully, the self becomes free from all Kasayas and liberation is assured. Two main categories of Mohaniya karman are—darshana mohaniya and charitra mohaniya karma. With their subtypes there are 28 sub-types of mohaniya karman.

==== Darshana mohaniya karman ====
The darshana mahonia-karma causes a disturbance of the knowledge of the religious truth inherent in the jiva by natural disposition. These are further divided into three types according as to whether the disturbance is an absolute or a partial one:

1. Mithyatva karma: This causes complete unbelief or heterodoxy. If it realize itself, the jiva does not believe in the truths as proclaimed by Mahavira; he believes false prophets to be saints and enjoins false doctrines.
2. Samyagmithyatva (misra) karma: This produces a mixed belief, i.e., if it operates the soul waves to and for betwixt true and false; it is indifferent to the religion of the Jina and has no predilection for, nor hatred against it.
3. Samyaktva karma: This induces the correct belief. This samyaktva is not the correct faith in its completeness, but only in a preliminary degree; it is a mithyatva free from poison.

==== Charitra mohaniya karman ====
The charitra mohaniya-karma disturbs the right conduct possessed innately by the jiva; it hinders the soul from acting according to the religious prescriptions. The disturbance of the conduct is produced through the sixteen passions (kasaya), the six emotions with are categorised as non-passions (nokasaya) and the three genders (veda).

The four main passions are krodha (anger), maya (deceitfulness), mana (pride) and lobha (greed). The karmas are literally bound on account of the stickiness of the soul due to existence of various passions or mental dispositions Each of these is separated into 4 sub divisions, according to the intensity of their manifestation. The first one is anantanubandhin (of lifelong duration) which completely hinders belief and conduct. The second one is apratyakhyanavarana (hindering and non-renunciation) It makes impossible every reninciation, but allows the existence of true belief and lasts for one year. The third one of still milder intensity is pratyakhyanavarana (hindering with renunciation). It hinders the beginning of complete self-discipline, but does not prevent the existence of true belief and partial self-discipline (desavirati). Its effect lasts for 4 months. The last one is samjvalana (flaming up). It allows complete self-discipline, yet works against the attainment of complete right conduct (yathakhyata charitra). It lasts a fortnight.

The Nokasayas or the six non-passions are: hasya (laughing, joking or making fun of), rati (prejudicial liking or impartiality), arati (improper conduct) soka (sorrow), bhaya (fear), and jugupsa (disgust). All these six emotions are charitra mohaniyas, because the soul which is subjected to them, is hindered through them in the practice of right conduct.

The Vedas or the gender passion hinders the jiva from obeying the laws and from practicing self-discipline. It is of threefold variety, according to the three species of sexes:

- Purusa veda (the male gender and corresponding gender passion) - Through this, in the man the desire for union with a female is produced. Also man has at first an exceedingly strong desire, which disappears as soon as his lust is satisfied.
- stri veda (the female gender and corresponding gender passion) – Through this, in a woman the desire for union with a man is excited. Also the desire in the woman is weak so long as she is untouched, but grows into immensity through the enjoyment of intercourse.
- napumsaka veda (the third gender are to the burning of a town, which lasts long and finds no satisfaction.

=== Antaraya karma ===
The antaraya-karma hinders the energy (virya) of the jiva in a fivefold manner:

1. Dana antaraya-karma hinders dispensing alms. When it operates a person who knows the merit in giving and who has something to give away, is not capable to give it, although there is someone worthy of the gift.
2. Labha antaraya-karma hinders receiving. When it operates, a person is not capable of receiving a present, although a friendly giver and a suitable present are present.
3. Bhoga antaraya-karma hinders the enjoyment of something which can only be taken once (such as eating drinking).
4. Upabhoga antaraya-karma hinders the enjoyment of something which can be repeatedly used (such as a dwelling, clothing, women).
5. virya antaraya-karma hinders the will power. When it operates, even a strong, full grown man is incapable of bending a blade of grass.

== Aghatiya karmas ==
These do not affect the soul directly; rather, they have an effect on the body that houses the soul. These are:

1. Lifespan-determining karma (Āyu karma) – These karmas determine the subsequent states of existence and lifespan therein after death. The soul gets locked either into animal (tiryañca), infernal (nāraki), human (manuṣya), or celestial (deva) bodies for its next birth.
2. Body-determining karma (Nāma karma) – These karmas determine the type of body occupied by the soul.
3. Status-determining karma (Gotra karma) - The fruition of these karmas gives one high status or low status in society.
4. Feeling-producing karma (Vedanīya karma) - These karmas become an instrumental cause of the interruption of the soul's uninterrupted happiness. As a result of this, the soul remains agitated.

As soon as the Aghātiyā karmas gets exhausted soul attains Moksa (liberation).

=== Ayu Karma ===
The ayus-karma confers on a being a certain quantum of life in one of the four states of existence. Therefore, there are four types of ayu karmas: deva ayu (the celestial lifespan), manusya ayus (the human lifespan), tiryancha ayu (the animal lifespan), and naraka ayu (the infernal lifespan). The ayu-karma bestows a certain quantity of life, but not a definite number of years of life. For, as with a sponge, the quantity of water that it absorbs is determined, but not the time it takes to leave it, so also the quantum of life is determined, but not the time occupied in its consumption. The word ayu would, therefore, be approximately interpreted by "quantity of life" or "quantity of vitality"). The ayu of the new existence is always bound during the life immediately preceding it, especially in the 3rd, 9th, or 27th part or within the last 48 minutes of life.

=== Nama Karma ===
The nama-karma causes the individual diversities of the jivas. It is divided into 93 uttara prakrtis (sub-types), which are mostly quoted in a definitely fixed succession in 4 groups (pinda prakrtis, pratyeka prakrtis, trasadasaka, sthavara dasaka). They are the following:

- Four states of existence:
  - Deva gati nama-karma bestows the celestial state of existence,
  - Manusya gati nama-karma bestows the human state of existence,
  - Tiryag gati nama-karma bestows the animal state of existence, and
  - Naraka gati nama-karma which bestows the infernal state of existence.
- Five classes of beings:
  - Ekendriya jati nama karma causes birth as a being with one sense.
  - Dvindriya jati nama karma causes birth as a being with two senses.
  - Trindriya jati nama karma causes birth as a being with three senses.
  - Caturindriya jati nama karma causes birth as being with four senses
  - Pancendriya jati nama karma causes birth as a being with five senses.
- Five types of bodies:
  - Audarika sarira nama karma gives a gross physical body peculiar to animals and men.
  - Vaikriya sarira nama karma gives the transformational body which consists of fine matter that changes in form and dimension. This body exists by nature in gods, infernal beings and certain animals; men can attain it through higher perfection.
  - Aharaka sarira nama karma gives the translocation body. This body consists of good and pure substance and is without active and passive resistance. It is created for a short time by an apramatta samyata ascetic (ascetic with some carelessness), in order to seek for information concerning intricate dogmatic questions from an Arihant who is in another part of the world, while his own physical body remains in its original place.
  - Taijasa sarira nama karma gives the fiery body. This body consists of fire pudgalas and serves for the digestion of swallowed food. It can also be used by ascetics to burn other beings or things.
  - Karmana sarira nama karma gives the karman body which is possessed by all worldly souls. This body is the receptacle for karman matter. It changes every moment, because new karman is continually assimilated by the soul and the already existing one consumed. Accompanied by it, the jiva at death leaves his other bodies and betakes himself to the place of his new birth, where the karman body then forms the basis of the newly produced other bodies. This body is destroyed only when all the karma are destroyed.

Of these 5 bodies each succeeding one is finer than the one preceding it, but contains more material points than it; it is therefore denser. Every worldly soul (that is, soul not yet liberated) is always connected with a fiery and a karman body, but can, in addition, still possess one or two other bodies. At any given point of time four bodies can co-exist with a soul. For example, humans normally have three bodies simultaneously—audarika sarira (normal visible gross physical body), taijasa sarira (fiery body), and karmana sarira (karmic body). Some higher spiritual ascetics may possess vaikriya sarira (transformational body).

- Corresponding to these five bodies there are thirteen more karmas to make the bodies operative. There are three types of angopanga nama karma for body parts—audarika angopanga nama-karma, vaikriya angopanga nama-karma and aharaka angopanga nama-karma. Fiery and the karman body are subtle and have no body parts. Each body requires specific binding to operate that is enabled by its respective karma. Hence there are five types of bandhana or bindings for these body parts—audarika bandana nama-karma, vaikriya bandana nama-karma, aharaka bandana nama-karma, taijasa bandana nama-karma and karmana bandana nama karma which procures the binding of physical, transformational, translocational, fiery and karmic body respectively. At the same time, combination of molecules (samghatanas) is required for binding of bodies, which are—audarika samghatana nama-karma, vaikriya samghatana nama-karma adharaka samghatana nama-karma, taijasa samghatana nama-karma, and karmana samghatana nama-karma.
- Six Karmas related to joints:
  - Vajra rsabha naraca samhanana nama-karma gives an excellent joining. The two bones are hooked into one another, through the joining, a nail (vajra) is hammered and the whole joint is surrounded by a bandage.
  - Rsabha naraca samhanana nama-karma gives a joining not so firm as the preceding one, because the nail is missing.
  - Naraca samhanan nama-karma gives a joining which is still weaker, because the bandage is missing.
  - Ardha naraca samhanana nama-karma gives a joining which is on one side like the preceding one, while on the other the bones are simply pressed together and nailed.
  - Kilika samhanana nama-karma gives a weak joining, by which the bones are merely pressed together and nailed.
  - Sevarta (chedaprstha) samhanana nama-karma gives quite a weak joining, by which the ends of the bones only touch one another. The humans in this era as per Jain cosmology have this type of joint structure.

The samhananas play a great role in Jain doctrine. Only the first four make a meditation possible and only the best structure, the 1st joining of the joints, permits the highest kind of concentration which precedes salvation.

- The six samsthana nama-karmas related to body symmetry are:
  - Samacaturasra samsthana nama-karma, which causes the entire body to be symmetrically built.
  - Nyagrodhaparimandala samsthana nama-karma, which causes the upper part of the body to be symmetrical, but not the lower.
  - Sadi samsthana nama-karma, which makes the body below the navel symmetrical and above it unsymmetrical.
  - Kubja samsthana nama-karma makes the body hunchbacked, i.e. hands, feet, head and neck symmetrical, breast and belly unsymmetrical.
  - Vamana samsthana nama-karma dwarf like, i.e. breast and belly symmetrical, hands, feet etc. unsymmetrical.
  - Hunda samsthana nama-karma makes the entire body unsymmetrical.

The conception of symmetry is explained in the following way: One imagines a man sitting in the paryanka posture, i.e. crossing the legs and placing the hands over the navel. If one imagines that the two knees are joined by a line, and from the right shoulder to the left knee, and from the left shoulder to the right knee, and from the forehead to the hands, a straight line is drawn, one gets four lines. If these are equal to one another, symmetry is apparent; if they are not so, one of the other 5 samsthanas results. Gods have only the first symmetry, infernal beings and jivas who have been produced through coagulation only the 6th figure; in the case of animals and men (also of kevalins) all six samsthanas are to be found.

- The following karmas provide different types colors to the bodies: krsna varna nama-karma (black), nila varna nama-karma (dark, blue green, like an emerald), lohita varna nama-karma (colour which is red, like vermillion), haridra varna nama-karma (yellow, like turmeric) and sita varna nama ( white, like a shell). Other colors, such as brown etc., are produced by mixing. Black and green are considered as being pleasant, the others as unpleasant colors.
- The following karmas provide different types of odors to the bodies: surabhi gandha nama-karma produces pleasant odors (e.g., that of camphor) and durabhi gandha nama-karma produces unpleasant odors (e.g., that of garlic).
- The following karmas provide different abilities of tastes to the bodies: tikta rasa nama-karma gives a bitter taste (like that of the nimba fruit), kasaya rasa nama-karma gives an astringent taste (like that of bibhitaka), amla rasa nama-karma gives a sour taste (like that of tamarind) and madhura rasa nama-karma gives a sweet taste (like that of sugar). The salt taste is produced by a combination of the sweet taste with another. Bitter and biting tastes are considered unpleasant, the others pleasant.
- Eight karmas related to different type of touches are:
  - Guru sparsa nama-karma which causes a thing to be heavy, like an iron ball.
  - Laghu sparsa nama-karma which causes a thing to be light, like particles in a sunbeam.
  - Mrdu sparsa nama-karma causes a thing to be smooth, like a tinisa tendril.
  - Khara sparsa nama-karma which causes a thing to be rough, like stone.
  - Sita sparsa nama-karma causes a thing to be cold, like snow.
  - Usna sparsa nama-karma causes a thing to be warm, like fire.
  - Snigdha sparsa nama-karma causes a thing to be adhesive, like oil.
  - Ruksa sparsa nama-karma cases a thing to be dry like ashes.

Heavy, hard, dry, cold are considered to be unpleasant touches, the others pleasant.

- The anupurvi nama-karma causes that the jiva, when one existence is finished, goes from the place of death in the proper direction to the place of his new birth. According to the 4 states of existence (celestial, human, animal, infernal) there are 4 anupurvi karmas, namely: deva anupurvi nama karma, manusya anupurvi nama karma, tiryag anupurvi nama karma, and naraka anupurvi nama karma.
- Karma that bestows different gaits to souls are: prasasta vihayogati nama-karma which causes a being to move in a pleasant manner, as e.g. oxen, elephants and geese do and aprasasta vihayogati nama-karma which causes an ugly manner of motion, as, e.g. one finds with camels and asses.
- Following are the eight karmas related to eight pratyeka prakrtis:
  - Paraghata nama karma– It gives superiority over others. It endows the capability of injuring or vanquishing others; on the other hand, it prevents one from being injured or overcome by others.
  - Ucchvasa nama karma – It bestows the capability of breathing.
  - Atapa nama karma – It causes the body of a being not in itself hot to emit a warm splendour.
  - Uddyota nama karma– It causes the transformation body of the gods and ascetics, as well as moon, stars, precious stones, herbs and shining insects to emit a cold lustre.
  - Agurulaghu nama karma– It makes a being neither heavy nor light, i.e., causes it to possess neither absolute weight nor absolute lack of it.
  - Tirthankara nama karma– It procures the position of a ford-maker of the Jain religion.
  - Nirmana nama karma – It causes the formation of the body, i.e., it causes the members of a being to be in their right place.
  - Upaghata nama karma – It causes self-annihilation. It produces that the parts of the body of a being (e.g.the uvula in the throat) cause its death.
- The ten karmas related to trasa prakrtis (positive karmas) are:
  - Trasa nama karma, which gives a voluntarily movable body.
  - Badara nama karma, which gives a gross body.
  - Paryapta nama karma, which causes the complete development of the organs (karana) and capacities (labdhi) of nourishment, of the body, of the senses, of breathing, of speech, and of thought.
  - Pratyeka nama karma, which causes the being to possess an individual body.
  - Sthira nama karma, which causes the teeth, bones, etc., to be firm.
  - Subha nama karma, which causes the parts of the body above the navel to be beautiful.
  - Subhaga nama karma, which causes some one to whom is not under an obligation to be sympathetic to one.
  - Susvara nama karma, which bestows a voice which is melodious.
  - Adeya nama karma, which causes that some one is suggestive, so that his speech meets with approbation and belief.
  - Yasahkirti nama karma, which grants honour and glory.
- The ten karmas related to sthavara prakrtis (opposite of trasa prakrtis) are:
  - Sthavara nama karma, which, causes a body (of plants and elementary beings) that cannot be moved voluntarily.
  - Suksma nama karma gives (to elementary beings) a subtle body, imperceptible to our senses.
  - Aparyapta nama karma causes that the organs or faculties of a being do not attain full development, but remain undeveloped.
  - Sadharana nama karma gives (to plants etc.) a body in common with others of their species.
  - Asthira nama karma causes that ears, brows, tongue, etc. are flexible.
  - Asubha nama karma causes at all parts of the body, below the navel are considered to be ugly, so that somebody who is touched by the foot feels this to be unpleasant.
  - Durbhaga nama karma makes the jiva unsympathetic.
  - Duhsvara nama karma makes the voice ill sounding.
  - Anadeya nama karma makes the jiva unsuggestable.
  - Ayasahkirti nama karma causes dishonor and shame.

=== Gotra Karma ===
The gotra karma or the status determining karma destines the rank occupied by a person through his birth. They are of two types:

- uccair gotra-karma bestows high family surroundings.
- nicair gotra-karma bestows low family surroundings.

=== Vedaniya Karma ===
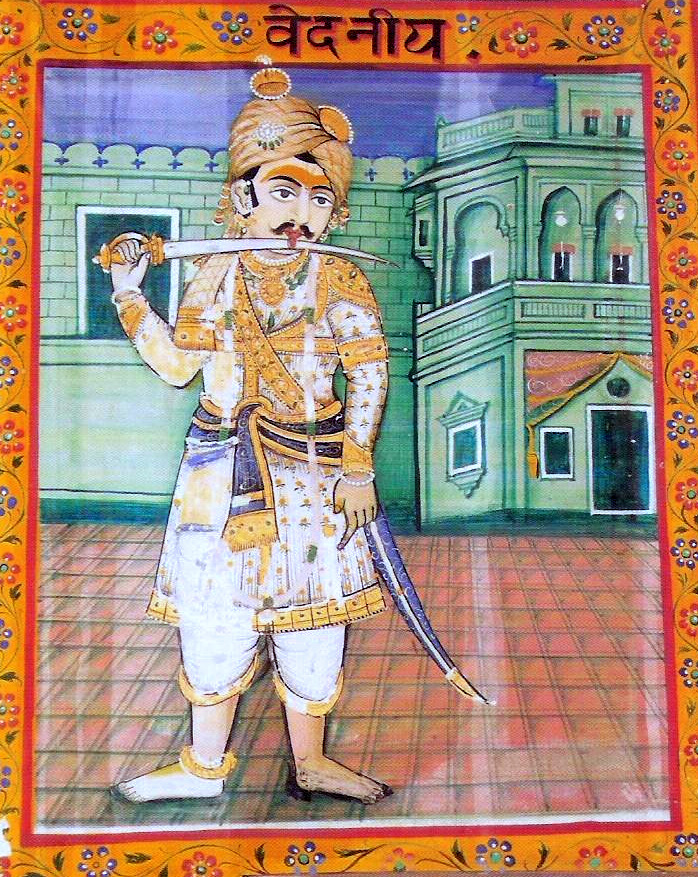
Vediniya karma: Pain and Pleasure is induced on account of licking honey from the sword

The vedaniya karma or feeling producing karmas are of two types:

- sata vedaniya-karma which causes a feeling of pleasure, created, e.g. by licking something sweet,
- asata vedaniya-karma which causes the feeling of pain, created, e.g. if one is hurt by a sword.

With gods and men the sata vedaniya is predominant, although, also with the former at the time of the downfall from the celestial world, and with the latter through cold and heat, death and accident, pain can be produced. Animals and infernal beings experience chiefly the asata vedaniya, although, also, at the birth of a Jina or on a similar occasion, they can experience a feeling of pleasure.

== Duration of Karmas ==
The maximum duration of attachment of karma is 7 Quadrillion Sagaropama or 7 × 10^225 Years. A Sagaropama or "ocean measured year"equals 10^210 Years. It is derived from Sanskrit word sagara or ocean. The minimum amount of time is less than one muharta. (Note: 1 muharta = 48 minutes) The maximum and minimum time for which the karmas remain bound to our consciousness depends on the type of karma which is as follows:

Type of Karma	Maximum duration	Minimum duration
Jñānavaraṇa Karma	3 × 10^{225} Years	<1 muhūrta (less than 48 minutes)
Darsanavarniya Karma	3 × 10^{225} Years	<1 muhūrta (less than 48 minutes)
Mohaniya Karma	7 × 10^{225} Years	<1 muhūrta (less than 48 minutes)
Antraya Karma	3 × 10^{226} Years	<1 muhūrta (less than 48 minutes)
Ayu Karma	3.3 × 10^{221} Years	<1 muhūrta (less than 48 minutes)
Nama Karma	2 × 10^{225} Years	8 muhūrta (6 hrs and 24 min)
Gotra Karma	2 × 10^{225} Years	8 muhūrta (6 hrs and 24 min)
Vedniya Karma	3 × 10^{225} Years	12 muhūrta (9 hrs and 36 min)

== See also ==
- Jainism
- Tirthankar
- Deshna
- Karma in Jainism
- Jain cosmology
- Moksa (Jainism)
- Ahimsa in Jainism
- Dharma (Jainism)
- Tattva (Jainism)
- Samsara (Jainism)
- Causes of Karma
