= Lesya =

Jain philosophical concept

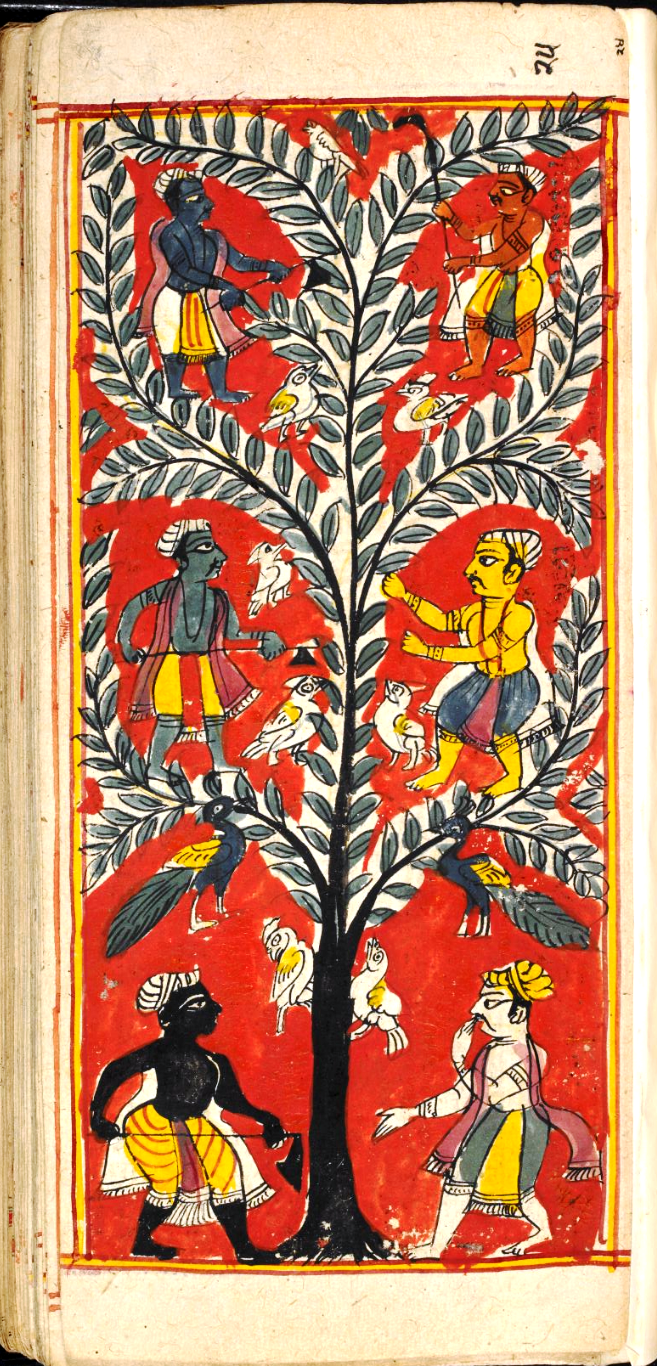
Six leśyā depicted by colors and parable of tree in miniature from 17th c., Saṁgrahaṇīratna by Śrīcandra, in Prakrit with a Gujarati commentary. Jain Śvetāmbara cosmological text with commentary and illustrations.

Lesya, according to the Jain theory of karma, is the coloring of the soul on account of its association with the karmic matter. The colour of leśyā varies from person to person depending on the psychic states and mental activities behind an action. The coloring of the soul is explained through the analogy of crystal, that acquires the color of the matter associated with it. In the same way, the soul reflects the qualities of colour, taste, smell and touch of associated karmic matter, although it is usually the colour that is referred to when discussing the leśyās. Paul Dundas notes the key text expressing this Jain doctrine, explaining how the literary form of the text is helpful in dating and reconstructing the history of transmission.

A full statement of the theory of lesya occurs in chapter 34 of the Uttaradhyayana, one of the fundamental sutras of the scriptural canon. Inspection of the metrical structure there, which consists of a cluster of old sloka verses amplified by twice as many verses in the arya metre, makes clear that a great deal of ancient editorial care was taken to ensure that an original rudimentary description of this dimension of karma became fully cogent.

== Colours ==
The ancient Jain text Uttarādhyayana-sūtra speaks of six main categories of leśyā represented by six colours – black (krishna), blue (neel), grey (kapot), red (tejo), yellow (padma) and white (shukla). Uttarādhyayana-sūtra describes the mental disposition of persons having black and white leśyās:

- Black lesya (krishna leshya) represents the lowest kind of state of mind. A person in this state of mind shows no compassion or mercy. People are afraid of them as these kinds of people are often violent. They also carry jealousy and animosity within themselves.

A man who acts on the impulse of the five sins, does not possess the three guptis, has not ceased to injure the six (kinds of living beings), commits cruel acts, is wicked and violent, is afraid of no consequences, is mischievous and does not subdue his senses – a man of such habits develops the black leśyā.

— Uttarādhyayana-sūtra, 34.21:22

- People in blue lesya (neel leshya) are proud, haughty, and lazy. They are unreliable and other people avoid their company. They are cheaters, cowards, and hypocrites. These people also avoid all things religious.

A man of the following qualities: envy, anger, want of self-control, ignorance, deceit, want of modesty, greed, hatred, wickedness, carelessness, love of enjoyment; a man who pursues pleasures and does not abstain from sinful undertakings, who is wicked and violent – a man of such habits develops the blue leśyā.

— Uttarādhyayana-sūtra, 34.23:24

- Someone in grey lesya (kapot lesya) always remains sad and gloomy. They find faults in others and are vindictive. They boast about themselves, become excited over small matters, and lack mental balance.

A man who is dishonest in words and acts, who is base, not upright, a dissembler and deceiver 3, a heretic, a vile man, a talker of hurtful and sinful things, a thief, and full of jealousy – a man of such habits develops the grey leśyā.

— Uttarādhyayana-sūtra, 34.25:26

- People in red lesya (tejo leshya) are very careful about their actions and can discriminate between good and evil. They know the difference between what is right and what is wrong. They are kind, benevolent, religious, and lead a harmonious life.

A man who is humble, steadfast, free from deceit and inquisitiveness, well disciplined, restrained, attentive to his study and duties, who loves the Law and keeps it, who is afraid of forbidden things and strives after the highest good–a man of such habits develops the red leśyā.

— Uttarādhyayana-sūtra, 34.27:28

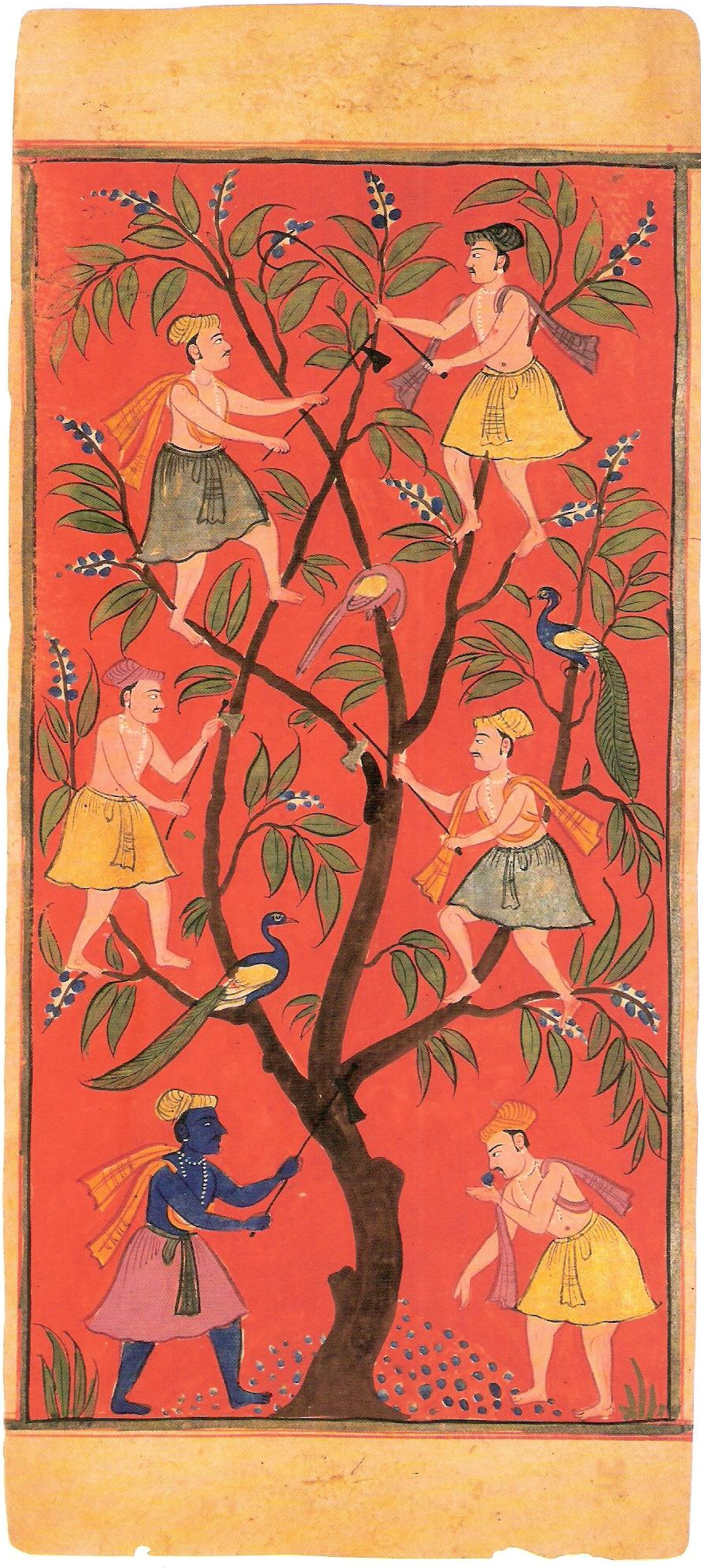
Lesyas depicted in Folio from Samghanayanarayna loose leaf manuscript (17th century) from Gujarat or Rajasthan

- A person with yellow lesya (padma leshya) is kind and benevolent and forgives everyone, even their enemies. They observe some austerities (mahavrata) and are vigilant in keeping their vows till their last breath. They remain unaffected by joys and sorrows.

A man who has but little anger, pride, deceit, and greed, whose mind is at ease, who controls himself, who is attentive to his study and duties, who speaks but little, is calm, and subdues his senses–a man of such habits develops the yellow leśyā.

— Uttarādhyayana-sūtra, 34.29:30

- Shukla ("white") leshya has two different levels. This state of mind refers to someone who strictly observe the principles of Jainism. They are trustworthy, treat every soul as if it were their own, and do not have any ill feelings even for their enemies. They remain calm even if someone abuses them. Passing in this state of mind allows a being to be reborn as a human being or an angel. People who have perfected this state of mind will become pure and will have escaped the cycle of life and death once they have died.

A man who abstains from constant thinking about his misery and about sinful deeds, but engages in meditation on the law and truth only, whose mind is at ease, who controls himself, who practises the samitis and guptis, whether he be still subject to passion or free from passion, is calm, and subdues his senses–a man of such habits develops the white leśyā.

— Uttarādhyayana-sūtra, 34.31:32

== Consequences ==
The black, blue and grey are inauspicious leśyā due to which the soul takes birth in various-unhappy states of existence. The yellow, red and white are the auspicious leśyās that enable a soul to take birth in various happy states of existence. According to Jain texts, a person with black Leshya will go to hell. A person with blue lesya is reincarnated in plant life and person with grey lesya is reincarnated in animal life. On the other hand, persons having red lesya are reincarnated as humans, those with yellow lesya are reincarnated as celestial beings while those having white lesya are either reborn in highest heaven or having achieved purity attain liberation.

== Parable of tree ==
The Jain texts further describe the mental dispositions of a soul on account of leśyās with an example of the reactions of six persons who are travelers, on seeing a fruit-bearing tree. They see a tree laden with fruits and begin to think of getting those fruits: one of them suggests uprooting the entire tree and eating the fruits; the second one suggests cutting the trunk of the tree; the third one suggests cutting the branches only; the fourth one suggests cutting the twigs; the fifth one suggests plucking the fruits only; the sixth one suggests picking up only the fruits that have fallen down. The thoughts, words and bodily activities of each of these six travellers are different based on their mental dispositions and are respectively illustrative of the six leśyās. The person with the black leśyā, having evil disposition, thinks of uprooting the whole tree even though he wants to eat only one fruit. The person proposing to cut the tree trunk has blue leśyā, the one suggesting cutting branches has grey leśyā, the person suggesting cutting twigs has red leśyā and the person thinking of simply plucking the fruits has yellow leśyā. On the other hand, the person with the white leśyā, having pure disposition, thinks only of picking up fruits fallen on the ground sparing the tree.

== See also ==
- Aura (paranormal)
- Halo (religious iconography)
- Karma in Jainism
- Soul
