= Karma in Jainism =

Religious principle

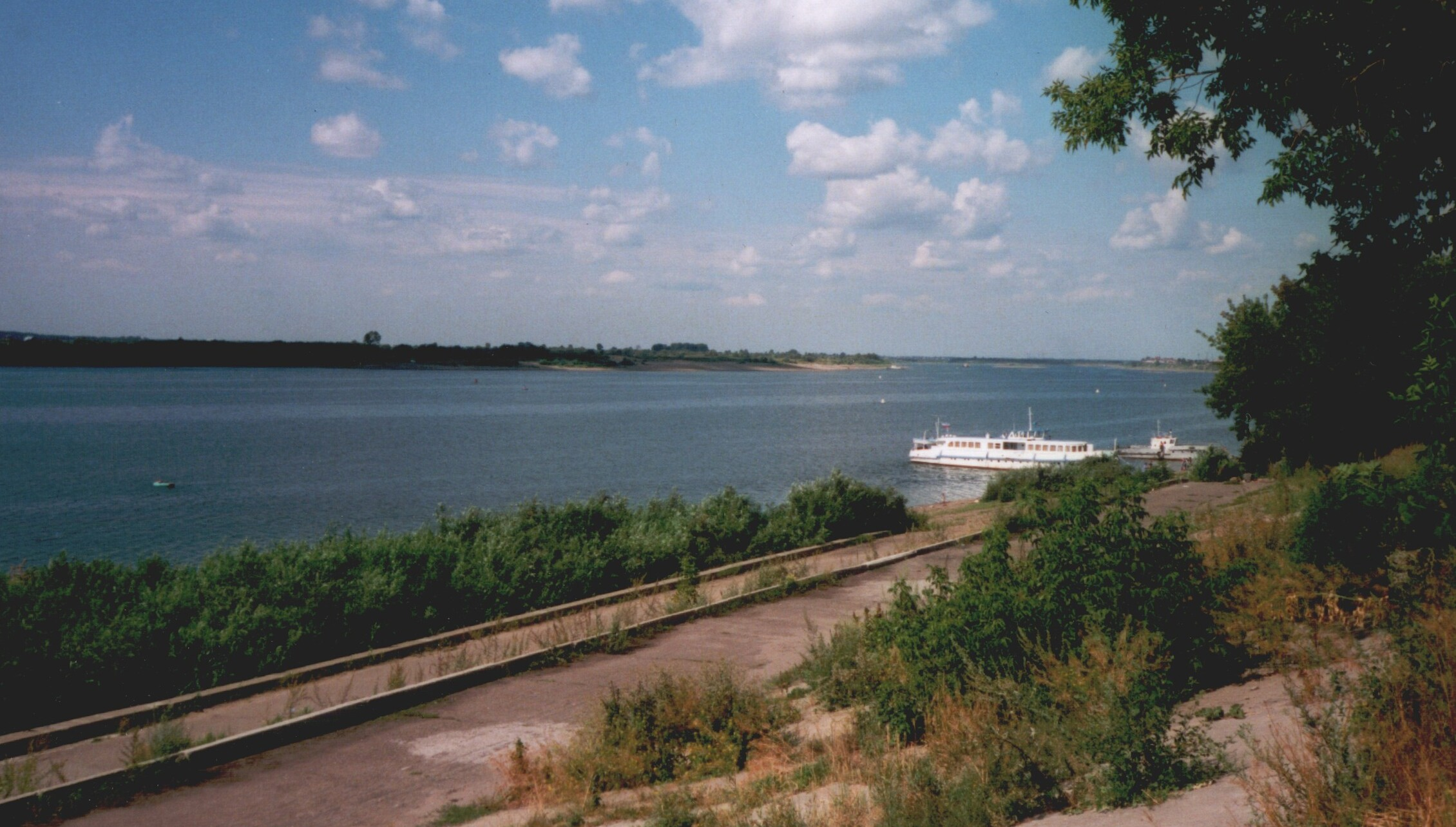
Broad classification of Karmas as per Jain philosophy

Karma is the basic principle within an overarching psycho-cosmology in Jainism. Human moral actions form the basis of the transmigration of the soul (jīva). The soul is constrained to a cycle of rebirth, trapped within the temporal world (saṃsāra), until it finally achieves liberation (mokṣa). Liberation is achieved by following a path of purification.

Jains believe that karma is a physical substance that is everywhere in the universe. Karma particles are attracted to the soul by the actions of that soul. Karma particles are attracted when we do, think, or say things, when we kill something, when we lie, when we steal and so on. Karma not only encompasses the causality of transmigration, but is also conceived of as an extremely subtle matter, which infiltrates the soul—obscuring its natural, transparent and pure qualities. Karma is thought of as a kind of pollution, that taints the soul with various colours (leśyā). Based on its karma, a soul undergoes transmigration and reincarnates in various states of existence—like heavens or hells, or as humans or animals.

Jains cite inequalities, sufferings, and pain as evidence for the existence of karma. Various types of karma are classified according to their effects on the potency of the soul. The Jain theory seeks to explain the karmic process by specifying the various causes of karmic influx (āsrava) and bondage (bandha), placing equal emphasis on deeds themselves, and the intentions behind those deeds. The Jain karmic theory attaches great responsibility to individual actions, and eliminates any reliance on some supposed existence of divine grace or retribution. The Jain doctrine also holds that it is possible for us to both modify our karma, and to obtain release from it, through the austerities and purity of conduct.

== Philosophical overview ==
According to Jains, all souls are intrinsically pure in their inherent and ideal state, possessing the qualities of infinite knowledge, infinite perception, infinite bliss and infinite energy. However, in contemporary experience, these qualities are found to be defiled and obstructed, on account of the association of these souls with karma. The soul has been associated with karma in this way throughout an eternity of beginning-less time. This bondage of the soul is explained in the Jain texts by analogy with gold ore, which—in its natural state—is always found unrefined of admixture with impurities. Similarly, the ideally pure state of the soul has always been overlaid with the impurities of karma. This analogy with gold ore is also taken one step further: the purification of the soul can be achieved if the proper methods of refining are applied. Over the centuries, Jain monks have developed a large and sophisticated corpus of literature describing the nature of the soul, various aspects of the working of karma, and the ways and means of attaining mokṣa. Tirthankara-nama-karma is a special type of karma, bondage of which raises a soul to the supreme status of a tirthankara.

=== Material theory ===
Jainism speaks of karmic "dirt", as karma is thought to be manifest as very subtle and sensually imperceptible particles pervading the entire universe. They are so small that one space-point—the smallest possible extent of space—contains an infinite number of karmic particles (or quantity of karmic dirt). It is these karmic particles that adhere to the soul and affect its natural potency. This material karma is called dravya karma; and the resultant emotions—pleasure, pain, love, hatred, and so on—experienced by the soul are called bhava karma, psychic karma. The relationship between the material and psychic karma is that of cause and effect. The material karma gives rise to the feelings and emotions in worldly souls, (Note: Jain philosophy categorises the souls jivas into two categories: worldly souls, who are unliberated; and liberated souls, who are free from all karma.) which—in turn—give rise to psychic karma, causing emotional modifications within the soul. These emotions, yet again, result in influx and bondage of fresh material karma. Jains hold that the karmic matter is actually an agent that enables the consciousness to act within the material context of this universe. They are the material carrier of a soul's desire to physically experience this world. When attracted to the consciousness, they are stored in an interactive karmic field called kārmaṇa śarīra, which emanates from the soul. Thus, karma is a subtle matter surrounding the consciousness of a soul. When these two components—consciousness and ripened karma—interact, the soul experiences life as known in the present material universe.

=== Self regulating mechanism ===
According to Indologist Robert J. Zydenbos, karma is a system of natural laws, where actions that carry moral significance are considered to cause certain consequences in the same way as physical actions. When one holds an apple and then lets it go, the apple will fall. There is no judge, and no moral judgment involved, since this is a mechanical consequence of the physical action. In the same manner, consequences occur naturally when one utters a lie, steals something, commits senseless violence or leads a life of debauchery. Rather than assume that these consequences—the moral rewards and retributions—are a work of some divine judge, Jains believe that there is an innate moral order in the cosmos, self-regulating through the workings of the law of karma. Morality and ethics are important in Jainism not because of a God, but because a life led in agreement with moral and ethical principles (mahavrata) is considered beneficial: it leads to a decrease—and finally to the total loss of—karma, which in turn leads to everlasting happiness. The Jain conception of karma takes away the responsibility for salvation from God and bestows it on man himself. In the words of the Jain scholar, J. L. Jaini:

Jainism, more than any other creed, gives absolute religious independence and freedom to man. Nothing can intervene between the actions which we do and the fruits thereof. Once done, they become our masters and must fructify. As my independence is great, so my responsibility is co-extensive with it. I can live as I like; but my voice is irrevocable, and I cannot escape the consequences of it. No God, his Prophet or his deputy or beloved can interfere with human life. The soul, and it alone is responsible for all it does.

=== Predominance of karma ===
According to Jainism, karmic consequences are unerringly certain and inescapable. No divine grace can save a person from experiencing them. Only the practice of austerities and self-control can modify or alleviate the consequences of karma. Even then, in some cases, there is no option but to accept karma with equanimity. The second-century Jain text, Bhagavatī Ārādhanā (verse no. 1616) sums up the predominance of karma in Jain doctrine:

There is nothing mightier in the world than karma; karma tramples down all powers, as an elephant a clump of lotuses.

This predominance of karma is a theme often explored by Jain ascetics in the literature they have produced, throughout all centuries. Paul Dundas notes that the ascetics often used cautionary tales to underline the full karmic implications of morally incorrect modes of life, or excessively intense emotional relationships. However, he notes that such narratives were often softened by concluding statements about the transforming effects of the protagonists' pious actions, and their eventual attainment of liberation.

The biographies of legendary persons like Rama and Krishna, in the Jain versions of the epics Ramayana and Mahabharata, (Note: "The first Jain version of the Rāmāyaṇa was written in about the fourth century CE in Prākrit by Vimala Sūri." see Dundas, Paul (2002): pp. 238–39.) (Note: "The Jains seem at times to have employed the epic to engage in confrontation with the Hindus. In the sixteenth century, Jain writers in western India produced versions of the Mahābhārata libelling Viṣṇu who, according to another influential Hindu text, the Śiva Purāṇa, had created a fordmaker-like figure who converted the demons to Jain mendicancy, thus enabling the gods to defeat them. Another target of these Jain Mahābhāratas was Kṛṣṇa who ceases to be the pious Jain of early Śvetāmbara tradition and instead is portrayed as a devious and immoral schemer." see Dundas, Paul (2002): p. 237.) also have karma as one of the major themes. The major events, characters and circumstances are explained by reference to their past lives, with examples of specific actions of particular intensity in one life determining events in the next. Jain texts narrate how even Māhavīra, one of the most popular propagators of Jainism and the 24th tīrthaṇkara (ford-maker), (Note: The word tīrthaṇkara is translated as ford-maker, but is also loosely translated as a prophet or a teacher. Fording means crossing or wading in the river. Hence, they are called ford-makers because they serve as ferrymen across the river of transmigration. see Grimes, John (1996) p. 320) had to bear the brunt of his previous karma before attaining kevala jñāna. He attained it only after bearing twelve years of severe austerity with detachment. The Ācāranga Sūtra speaks of how Māhavīra bore his karma with complete equanimity, as follows:

He was struck with a stick, the fist, a lance, hit with a fruit, a clod, a potsherd. Beating him again and again many cried. When he once sat without moving his body many cut his flesh, tore his hair under pain, or covered him with dust. Throwing him up they let him fall, or disturbed him in his religious postures; abandoning the care of his body, the Venerable One humbled himself and bore pain, free from desires. As a hero at the head of the battle is surrounded by all sides, so was there Māhavīra. Bearing all hardships, the Venerable One, undisturbed, proceeded on the road to nirvāṇa.

— Ācāranga Sūtra 8–356:60

=== Reincarnation and transmigration ===
Karma forms a central and fundamental part of Jain faith, being intricately connected to other of its philosophical concepts like transmigration, reincarnation, liberation, non-violence (ahiṃsā) and non-attachment, among others. Actions are seen to have consequences: some immediate, some delayed, even into future incarnations. So the doctrine of karma is not considered simply in relation to one life-time, but also in relation to both future incarnations and past lives. Uttarādhyayana-sūtra 3.3–4 states:

The jīva or the soul is sometimes born in the world of gods, sometimes in hell. Sometimes it acquires the body of a demon; all this happens on account of its karma. This jīva sometimes takes birth as a worm, as an insect or as an ant.

The text further states (32.7):

Karma is the root of birth and death. The souls bound by karma go round and round in the cycle of existence.

There is no retribution, judgment or reward involved but a natural consequences of the choices in life made either knowingly or unknowingly. Hence, whatever suffering or pleasure that a soul may be experiencing in its present life is on account of choices that it has made in the past. As a result of this doctrine, Jainism attributes supreme importance to pure thinking and moral behavior.

=== Four Gatis (states of existence) ===
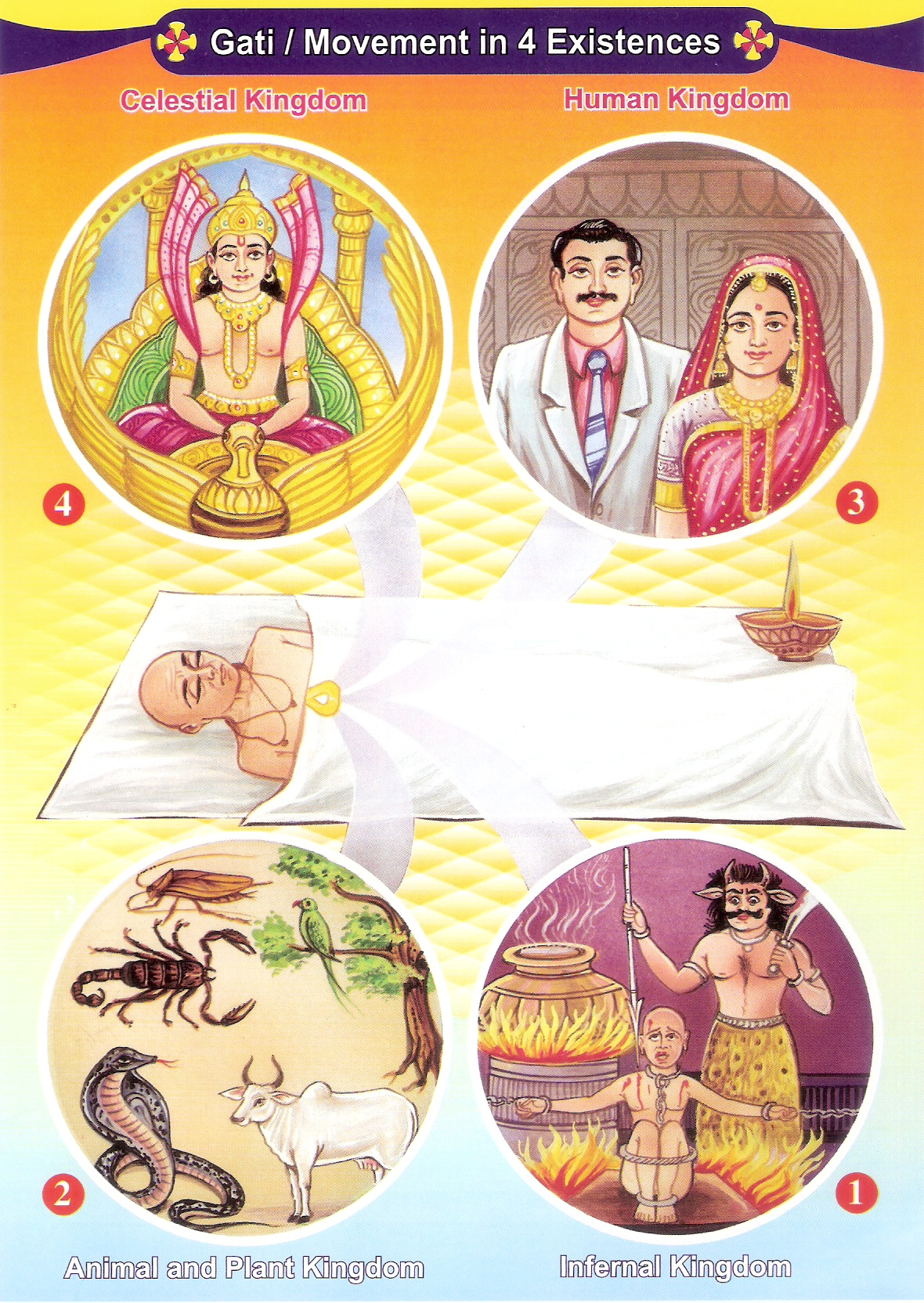
The soul travels to any one of the four states of existence after the death depending on its karmas.

The Jain texts postulate four gatis, that is states-of-existence or birth-categories, within which the soul transmigrates. The four gatis are: deva (demi-gods), manuṣya (humans), nāraki (hell beings) and tiryañca (animals, plants and micro-organisms). The four gatis have four corresponding realms or habitation levels in the vertically tiered Jain universe: demi-gods occupy the higher levels where the heavens are situated; humans, plants and animals occupy the middle levels; and hellish beings occupy the lower levels where seven hells are situated.

Single-sensed souls, however, called nigoda, (Note: The Jain hierarchy of life classifies living beings on the basis of the senses: five-sensed beings like humans and animals are at the top, and single sensed beings like microbes and plants are at the bottom.) and element-bodied souls pervade all tiers of this universe. Nigodas are souls at the bottom end of the existential hierarchy. They are so tiny and undifferentiated, that they lack even individual bodies, living in colonies. According to Jain texts, this infinity of nigodas can also be found in plant tissues, root vegetables and animal bodies. Depending on its karma, a soul transmigrates and reincarnates within the scope of this cosmology of destinies. The four main destinies are further divided into sub-categories and still smaller sub–sub categories. In all, Jain texts speak of a cycle of 8.4 million birth destinies in which souls find themselves again and again as they cycle within samsara.

In Jainism, God has no role to play in an individual's destiny; one's personal destiny is not seen as a consequence of any system of reward or punishment, but rather as a result of its own personal karma. A text from a volume of the ancient Jain canon, Bhagvati sūtra 8.9.9, links specific states of existence to specific karmas. Violent deeds, killing of creatures having five sense organs, eating fish, and so on, lead to rebirth in hell. Deception, fraud and falsehood leads to rebirth in the animal and vegetable world. Kindness, compassion and humble character result in human birth; while austerities and the making and keeping of vows leads to rebirth in heaven.

There are five types of bodies in the Jain thought: earthly (e.g. most humans, animals and plants), metamorphic (e.g. gods, hell beings, fine matter, some animals and a few humans who can morph because of their perfections), transference type (e.g. good and pure substances realized by ascetics), fiery (e.g. heat that transforms or digests food), and karmic (the substrate where the karmic particles reside and which make the soul ever changing).

Jain philosophy further divides the earthly body by symmetry, number of sensory organs, vitalities (ayus), functional capabilities and whether one body hosts one soul or one body hosts many. Every living being has one to five senses, three balas (power of body, language and mind), respiration (inhalation and exhalation), and life-duration. All living beings, in every realm including the gods and hell beings, accrue and destroy eight types of karma according to the elaborate theories in Jain texts. Elaborate descriptions of the shape and function of the physical and metaphysical universe, and its constituents are also provided in the Jain texts. All of these elaborate theories attempt to illustrate and consistently explain the Jain karma theory in a deeply moral framework, much like Buddhism and Hinduism but with significant differences in the details and assumptions.

=== Lesya – colouring of the soul ===
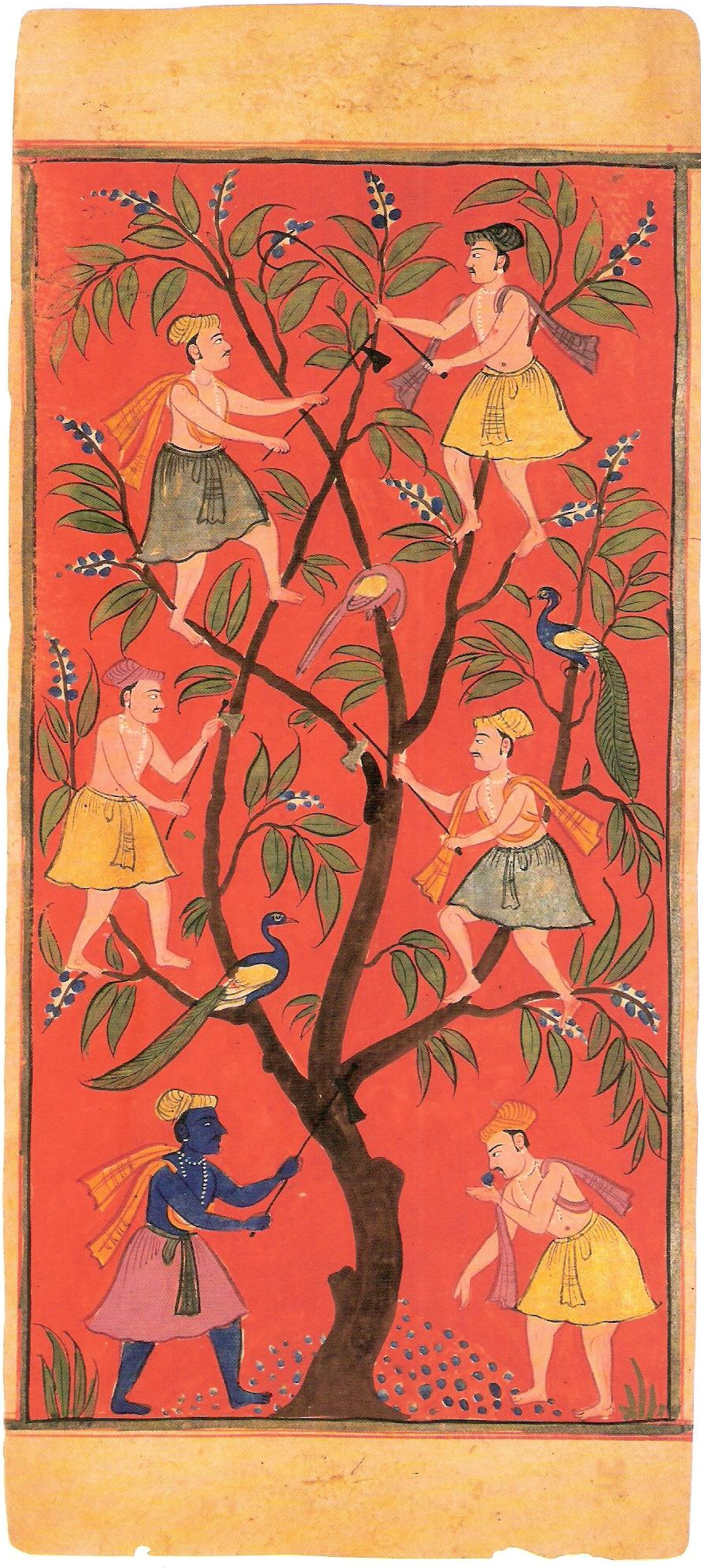
The common representation of the mango tree and men analogy of the lesyas.

According to the Jain theory of karma, the karmic matter imparts a colour (leśyā) to the soul, depending on the mental activities behind an action. The coloring of the soul is explained through the analogy of crystal, that acquires the color of the matter associated with it. In the same way, the soul also reflects the qualities of taste, smell and touch of associated karmic matter, although it is usually the colour that is referred to when discussing the leśyās. Uttarādhyayana-sūtra 34.3 speaks of six main categories of leśyā represented by six colours: black, blue, grey, yellow, red and white. The black, blue and grey are inauspicious leśyā, leading to the soul being born into misfortunes. The yellow, red and white are auspicious leśyās, that lead to the soul being born into good fortune. Uttarādhyayana-sūtra describes the mental disposition of persons having black and white leśyās:

The Jain texts further illustrate the effects of leśyās on the mental dispositions of a soul, using an example of the reactions of six travellers on seeing a fruit-bearing tree. They see a tree laden with fruit and begin to think of getting those fruits: one of them suggests uprooting the entire tree and eating the fruit; the second one suggests cutting the trunk of the tree; the third one suggests simply cutting the branches; the fourth one suggests cutting the twigs and sparing the branches and the tree; the fifth one suggests plucking only the fruits; the sixth one suggests picking up only the fruits that have fallen down. The thoughts, words and bodily activities of each of these six travellers are different based on their mental dispositions and are respectively illustrative of the six leśyās. At one extreme, the person with the black leśyā, having evil disposition, thinks of uprooting the whole tree even though he wants to eat only one fruit. At the other extreme, the person with the white leśyā, having a pure disposition, thinks of picking up the fallen fruit, in order to spare the tree.

=== Role of deeds and intent ===
The role of intent is one of the most important and definitive elements of the karma theory, in all its traditions. In Jainism, intent is important but not an essential precondition of sin or wrong conduct. Evil intent forms only one of the modes of committing sin. Any action committed, knowingly or unknowingly, has karmic repercussions. In certain philosophies, like Buddhism, a person is guilty of violence only if he had an intention to commit violence. On the other hand, according to Jains, if an act produces violence, then the person is guilty of it, whether or not he had an intention to commit it.

John Koller explains the role of intent in Jainism with the example of a monk, who unknowingly offered poisoned food to his brethren. According to the Jain view, the monk is guilty of a violent act if the other monks die because they eat the poisoned food; but according to the Buddhist view he would not be guilty. The crucial difference between the two views is that the Buddhist view excuses the act, categorizing it as non-intentional, since he was not aware that the food was poisoned; whereas the Jain view holds the monk to have been responsible, due to his ignorance and carelessness. Jains argue that the monk's very ignorance and carelessness constitute an intent to do violence and hence entail his guilt. So the absence of intent does not absolve a person from the karmic consequences of guilt either, according to the Jain analysis.

Intent is a function of kaṣāya, which refers to negative emotions and negative qualities of mental (or deliberative) action. The presence of intent acts as an aggravating factor, increasing the vibrations of the soul, which results in the soul absorbing more karma. This is explained by Tattvārthasūtra 6.7: "[The] intentional act produces a strong karmic bondage and [the] unintentional produces weak, shortlived karmic bondage." Similarly, the physical act is also not a necessary condition for karma to bind to the soul: the existence of intent alone is sufficient. This is explained by Kundakunda (1st Century CE) in Samayasāra 262–263: "The intent to kill, to steal, to be unchaste and to acquire property, whether these offences are actually carried or not, leads to bondage of evil karmas." Jainism thus places an equal emphasis on the physical act as well as intent for binding of karmas.

== Origins and influence ==
Although the doctrine of karma is central to all Indian religions, it is difficult to say when and where in India the concept of karma originated. In Jainism, it is assumed its development took place in an era from which the literary documents are not available, since the basics of this doctrine were present and concluded even in the earliest documents of Jains. Acaranga Sutra and Sutrakritanga, contain a general outline of the doctrines of karma and reincarnation. The roots of this doctrine in Jainism might be in the teachings of Parsva, who is said to have lived about two hundred fifty years before Mahavira. The Jain conception of karma—as something material that encumbers the soul—has an archaic nature which justifies the hypothesis that it goes back to 8th or 9th century BCE.

The present form of the doctrine seems to be unchanged at least since the time of Bhadrabahu (c. 300 BCE) who is respected by both the sects. This is supported by the fact that both Svetambara and Digambara sects agree on the basic doctrine, giving indication that it reached in its present form before the schism took place. Bhadrabahu is usually seen as the last leader of united Jain sangh. Detailed codification of types of karma and their effects were attested by Umasvati who is regarded by both Digambara and Svetambara as one of theirs.

Jain and Buddhist scholar Padmanabh Jaini observes:

We are not yet in a position to explain definitivetly the earlier and more intense interest in karma shown by Jaina thinkers (and, to a lesser extent, by those of Buddhists) relative to their Brahmanic counterparts. Perhaps the entire concept that a person's situation and experiences are in fact the results of deeds committed in various lives may not be Aryan origin at all, but rather may have developed as a part of the indigenous Gangetic traditions from which the various Sramana movements arose. In any case we shall see, Jaina views on the process and possibilities of rebirth are distinctly non-Hindu; the social ramifications of these views, moreover, have been profound.

With regards to the influence of the theory of karma on development of various religious and social practices in ancient India, Padmanabh Jaini states:

The emphasis on reaping the fruits only of one's own karma was not restricted to the Jainas; both Hindus and Buddhist writers have produced doctrinal materials stressing the same point. Each of the latter traditions, however, developed practices in basic contradiction to such belief. In addition to śrāddha (the Hindu ritual of offering to the dead ancestors), we find among Hindus widespread adherence to the notion of divine intervention in one's fate, while (Mahayana) Buddhists eventually came to propound such theories like boon-granting Bodhisattvas, transfer of merit and like. Only Jains have been absolutely unwilling to allow such ideas to penetrate their community, despite the fact that there must have been tremendous amount of social pressure on them to do so.

The Jain socio-religious practices like regular fasting, practicing severe austerities and penances, the ritual death of Sallekhana and rejection of God as the creator and operator of the universe can all be linked to the Jain theory of karma. Jaini notes that the disagreement over the karmic theory of transmigration resulted in the social distinction between the Jains and their Hindu neighbours. Thus one of the most important Hindu rituals, śrāddha was not only rejected but strongly criticized by the Jains as superstition. Certain authors have also noted the strong influence of the concept of karma on the Jain ethics, especially the ethics of non-violence. Once the doctrine of transmigration of souls came to include rebirth on earth in animal as well as human form, depending upon one's karmas, it is quite probable that, it created a humanitarian sentiment of kinship amongst all life forms and thus contributed to the notion of ahiṃsā (non-violence).

== Factors affecting the effects of Karma ==
The nature of experience of the effects of the karma depends on the following four factors:

- Prakriti (nature or type of karma) – According to Jain texts, there are eight main types of karma which categorized into the 'harming' and the 'non-harming'; each divided into four types. The harming karmas (ghātiyā karmas) directly affect the soul powers by impeding its perception, knowledge and energy, and also brings about delusion. These harming karmas are: darśanāvaraṇa (perception-obscuring karma), jñānavāraṇa (knowledge-obscuring karma), antarāya (obstacle-creating karma) and mohanīya (deluding karma). The non-harming category (aghātiyā karmas) is responsible for the reborn soul's physical and mental circumstances, longevity, spiritual potential and experience of pleasant and unpleasant sensations. These non-harming karmas are: nāma (body-determining karma), āyu (lifespan-determining karma), gotra (status-determining karma) and vedanīya (feeling-producing karma), respectively. Different types of karmas thus affect the soul in different ways as per their nature.
- Sthiti (the duration of the karmic bond) – The karmic bond remains latent and bound to the consciousness up to the time it is activated. Although latent karma does not affect the soul directly, its existence limits the spiritual growth of the soul. Jain texts provide the minimum and the maximum duration for which such karma is bound before it matures.
- Anubhava (intensity of karmas) – The degree of the experience of the karmas, that is, mild or intense, depends on the anubhava quality or the intensity of the bondage. It determines the power of karmas and its effect on the soul. Anubhava depends on the intensity of the passions at the time of binding the karmas. More intense the emotions—like anger, greed etc.—at the time of binding the karma, the more intense will be its experience at the time of maturity.
- Pradesha (The quantity of the karmas) – It is the quantity of karmic matter that is received and gets activated at the time of experience.

Both emotions and activity play a part in binding of karmas. Duration and intensity of the karmic bond are determined by emotions or "kaṣāya" and type and quantity of the karmas bound is depended on yoga or activity.

== The process of bondage and release ==
The karmic process in Jainism is based on seven truths or fundamental principles (tattva) of Jainism which explain the human predicament. Out that the seven tattvas, the four—influx (āsrava), bondage (bandha), stoppage (saṃvara) and release (nirjarā)—pertain to the karmic process. In some instances these truths can also include non-meritorious types of karma (pāpa-prakṛti) and meritorious types (puṇya-prakṛti).

=== Attraction and binding ===
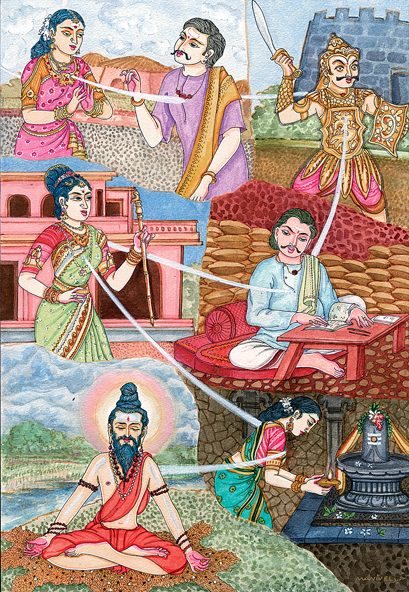
Representation of a soul undergoing reincarnation.

The karmic bondage occurs as a result of the following two processes: āsrava and bandha. Āsrava is the inflow of karma. The karmic influx occurs when the particles are attracted to the soul on account of yoga. Yoga is the vibrations of the soul due to activities of mind, speech and body. Some of these particles are then capable of interacting with a soul, and are divided into two categories: those that are karmically bondable to the soul (yogya), and those that are not bondable (aprayogya). Pūjyapāda, a renowned acharya, compares the activities through which karma flows into a soul to streams by means of which water flows into a lake. However, the yoga alone do not produce bondage. The karmas have effect only when they are bound to the consciousness. This binding of the karma to the consciousness is called bandha. Out of the many causes of bondage, emotions or passions are considered as the main cause of bondage. The karmas are literally bound on account of the stickiness of the soul due to existence of various passions or mental dispositions. The passions like anger, pride, deceit and greed are called sticky (kaṣāyas) because they act like glue in making karmic particles stick to the soul resulting in bandha. The karmic inflow on account of yoga driven by passions and emotions cause a long-term inflow of karma prolonging the cycle of reincarnations. On the other hand, the karmic inflows on account of actions that are not driven by passions and emotions have only a transient, short-lived karmic effect. Hence the ancient Jain texts talk of subduing these negative emotions:

When he wishes that which is good for him, he should get rid of the four faults—anger, pride, deceit and greed—which increase the evil. Anger and pride when not suppressed, and deceit and greed when arising: all these four black passions water the roots of re-birth.

— Daśavaikālika sūtra, 8:36–39

=== Causes of attraction and bondage ===
The Jain theory of karma proposes that karma particles are attracted and then bound to the consciousness of souls by a combination of four factors pertaining to actions: instrumentality, process, modality and motivation.

- The instrumentality of an action refers to whether the instrument of the action was: the body, as in physical actions; one's speech, as in speech acts; or the mind, as in thoughtful deliberation.
- The process of an action refers to the temporal sequence in which it occurs: the decision to act, plans to facilitate the act, making preparations necessary for the act, and ultimately the carrying through of the act itself.
- The modality of an action refers to different modes in which one can participate in an action, for example: being the one who carries out the act itself; being one who instigates another to perform the act; or being one who gives permission, approval or endorsement of an act.
- The motivation for an action refers to the internal passions or negative emotions that prompt the act, including: anger, greed, pride, deceit and so on.

All actions have the above four factor present in them. When different permutations of the sub-elements of the four factors are calculated, the Jain teachers speak of 108 ways in which the karmic matter can be attracted to the soul. Even giving silent assent or endorsement to acts of violence from far away has karmic consequences for the soul. Hence, the scriptures advise carefulness in actions, awareness of the world, and purity in thoughts as means to avoid the burden of karma.

According to the major Jain text, Tattvartha sutra:

Wrong belief, non-abstinence, negligence, passions, and activities are the causes of bondage.

— Tattvārthasūtra, 8-1

The individual self attracts particles of matter which are fit to turn into karma, as the self is actuated by passions. This is bondage.

— Tattvārthasūtra, 8-2

The causes of bandha or the karmic bondage—in the order they are required to be eliminated by a soul for spiritual progress—are:

- Mithyātva (Irrationality and a deluded world view) – The deluded world view is the misunderstanding as to how this world really functions on account of one-sided perspectives, perverse viewpoints, pointless generalisations and ignorance.
- Avirati (non-restraint or a vowless life) – Avirati is the inability to refrain voluntarily from the evil actions, that harms oneself and others. The state of avirati can only be overcome by observing the minor vows of a layman.
- Pramāda (carelessness and laxity of conduct) – This third cause of bondage consists of absentmindedness, lack of enthusiasm towards acquiring merit and spiritual growth, and improper actions of mind, body and speech without any regard to oneself or others.
- Kaṣāya (passions or negative emotions) – The four passions—anger, pride, deceit and greed—are the primary reason for the attachment of the karmas to the soul. They keep the soul immersed in the darkness of delusion leading to deluded conduct and unending cycles of reincarnations.
- Yoga (activities of mind, speech and body)

Each cause presupposes the existence of the next cause, but the next cause does not necessarily presuppose the existence of the previous cause. A soul is able to advance on the spiritual ladder called guṇasthāna, only when it is able to eliminate the above causes of bondage one by one.

=== Fruition ===
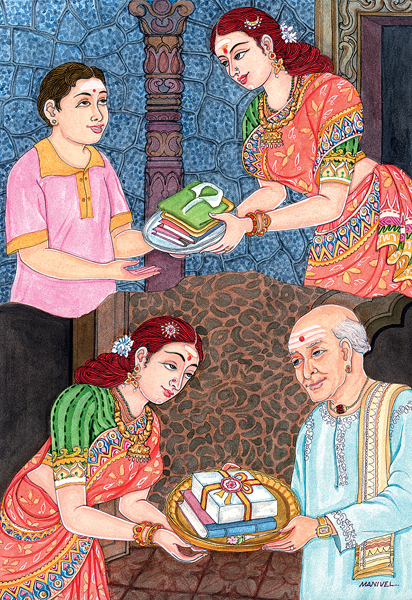
Karma as moral action and reaction: goodness sown is reaped as goodness.

The consequences of karma are inevitable, though they may take some time to take effect. To explain this, a Jain monk, Ratnaprabhacharya says:

The prosperity of a vicious man and misery of a virtuous man are respectively but the effects of good deeds and bad deeds done previously. The vice and virtue may have their effects in their next lives. In this way the law of causality is not infringed here.

The latent karma becomes active and bears fruit when the supportive conditions arise. A great part of attracted karma bears its consequences with minor fleeting effects, as generally most of our activities are influenced by mild negative emotions. However, those actions that are influenced by intense negative emotions cause an equally strong karmic attachment which usually does not bear fruit immediately. It takes on an inactive state and waits for the supportive conditions—like proper time, place, and environment—to arise for it to manifest and produce effects. If the supportive conditions do not arise, the respective karmas will manifest at the end of maximum period for which it can remain bound to the soul. These supportive conditions for activation of latent karmas are determined by the nature of karmas, intensity of emotional engagement at the time of binding karmas and our actual relation to time, place, surroundings. There are certain laws of precedence among the karmas, according to which the fruition of some of the karmas may be deferred but not absolutely barred.

Jain texts distinguish between the effect of the fruition of karma on a right believer and a wrong believer:

The ignorant, engrossed in the nature of various species of karmas, enjoys the fruits of karmas (in the form of pleasure and pain), and the knowledgeable is aware of the fruits of karmas but does not enjoy them

— Samayasāra (10-9-316)

=== Modifications ===
Although the Jains believe the karmic consequences as inevitable, Jain texts also hold that a soul has energy to transform and modify the effects of karma. Karma undergoes following modifications:

- Udaya (maturity) – It is the fruition of karmas as per its nature in the due course.
- Udīraṇa (premature operation) – By this process, it is possible to make certain karmas operative before their predetermined time.
- Udvartanā (augmentation) – By this process, there is a subsequent increase in duration and intensity of the karmas due to additional negative emotions and feelings.
- Apavartanā (diminution) – In this case, there is subsequent decrease in duration and intensity of the karmas due to positive emotions and feelings.
- Saṃkramaṇa (transformation) – It is the mutation or conversion of one sub-type of karmas into another sub-type. However, this does not occur between different types. For example, papa (bad karma) can be converted into punya (good karma) as both sub-types belong to the same type of karma.
- Upaśamanā (state of subsidence) – During this state the operation of karma does not occur. The karma becomes operative only when the duration of subsidence ceases.
- Nidhatti (prevention) – In this state, premature operation and transformation is not possible but augmentation and diminution of karmas is possible.
- Nikācanā (invariance) – For some sub-types, no variations or modifications are possible—the consequences are the same as were established at the time of bonding.

The Jain karmic theory, thus speaks of great powers of soul to manipulate the karmas by its actions.

=== Release ===
Jain philosophy assert that emancipation is not possible as long as the soul is not released from bondage of karma. This is possible by samvara (stoppage of inflow of new karmas) and nirjarā (shedding of existing karmas through conscious efforts). Samvara is achieved through practice of:

- Three guptis or three controls of mind, speech and body,
- Five samitis or observing carefulness in movement, speaking, eating, placing objects and disposing refuse.
- Ten dharmas or observation of good acts like – forgiveness, humility, straightforwardness, contentment, truthfulness, self-control, penance, renunciation, non-attachment and continence.
- Anuprekshas or meditation on the truths of this universe.
- Pariṣahajaya, that is, a man on moral path must develop a perfectly patient and unperturbed attitude in the midst of trying and difficult circumstances.
- Cāritra, that is, endeavour to remain in steady spiritual practices.

Nirjarā is possible through tapas, austerities and penances. Tapas can be either external or internal. Six forms of external tapas are—fasting, control of appetite, accepting food under certain conditions, renunciation of delicious food, sitting and sleeping in lonely place and renunciation of comforts. Six forms of internal tapas are—atonement, reverence, rendering of service to worthy ones, spiritual study, avoiding selfish feelings and meditation.

== Rationale ==
Justice Tukol notes that the supreme importance of the doctrine of karma lies in providing a rational and satisfying explanation to the apparent unexplainable phenomenon of birth and death, of happiness and misery, of inequalities and of existence of different species of living beings. The Sūtrakṛtāṅga, one of the oldest canons of Jainism, states:

Here in the east, west, north, and south many men have been born according to their merit, as inhabitants of this our world—some as Aryas, some as non-Aryas, some in noble families, some in low families, some as big men, some as small men, some of good complexion, some of bad complexion, some as handsome men, some as ugly men. And of these men one man is king.

— Sūtrakṛtāṅga, 2.1.13

Jains thus cite inequalities, sufferings, and pain as evidence for the existence of karma. The theory of karma is able to explain day-to-day observable phenomena such as inequality between the rich and the poor, luck, differences in lifespan, and the ability to enjoy life despite being immoral. According to Jains, such inequalities and oddities that exist even from the time of birth can be attributed to the deeds of the past lives and thus provide evidence to existence of karmas:

One is stout while another is lean; one is a master while another is a slave and similarly we find the high and the low, the mutilated and the lame, the blind and the deaf and many such oddities. The thrones of mighty monarchs are gone. The proud and the haughty have been humiliated in a moment and reduced to ashes. Even amongst the twins born of the same mother, we find one a dullard and another intelligent, one rich and another poor, one black and another white. What is all this due to? They could not have done any deeds while they were in their mother's womb. Then, why then should such oddities exist? We have then to infer that these disparities must be the result of their deeds in their past births though they are born together at one time. There are many oddities in this world and it will have to be admitted that behind all this some powerful force is at work whereby the world appears to be full of oddities. This force is called 'karma'. We are unable to perceive karma by our naked eyes, yet we are able to know it from its actions.

== Criticisms ==
The Jain theory of karma has been challenged from an early time by the Vedanta and Sāṃkhya branches of Hindu philosophy. In particular, Vedanta Hindus considered the Jain position on the supremacy and potency of karma, specifically its insistence on non-intervention by any Supreme Being in regard to the fate of souls, as nāstika or atheistic. For example, in a commentary to the Brahma Sutras (III, 2, 38, and 41), Adi Sankara, argues that the original karmic actions themselves cannot bring about the proper results at some future time; neither can super sensuous, non-intelligent qualities like adrsta—an unseen force being the metaphysical link between work and its result—by themselves mediate the appropriate, justly deserved pleasure and pain. The fruits, according to him, then, must be administered through the action of a conscious agent, namely, a supreme being (Ishvara). (Note: For the Jain refutation of the theory of God as operator and dispenser of karma, see Jainism and non-creationism.)

Jainism's strong emphasis on the doctrine of karma and intense asceticism was also criticised by the Buddhists. Thus, the Saṃyutta Nikāya narrates the story of Asibandhakaputta, a headman who was originally a disciple of Māhavīra. He debates with the Buddha, telling him that, according to Māhavīra (Nigaṇṭha Nātaputta), a man's fate or karma is decided by what he does habitually. The Buddha responds, considering this view to be inadequate, stating that even a habitual sinner spends more time "not doing the sin" and only some time actually "doing the sin."

In another Buddhist text Majjhima Nikāya, the Buddha criticizes Jain emphasis on the destruction of unobservable and unverifiable types of karma as a means to end suffering, rather than on eliminating evil mental states such as greed, hatred and delusion, which are observable and verifiable. In the Upālisutta dialogue of this Majjhima Nikāya text, Buddha contends with a Jain monk who asserts that bodily actions are the most criminal, in comparison to the actions of speech and mind. Buddha criticises this view, saying that the actions of mind are most criminal, and not the actions of speech or body. Buddha also criticises the Jain ascetic practice of various austerities, claiming that he, Buddha, is happier when not practising the austerities. (Note: In the 8th century Jain text Aṣṭakaprakaraṇam (11.1–8), Haribhadra refutes the Buddhist view that austerities and penances results in suffering and pain. According to him suffering is on account of past karmas and not due to penances. Even if penances result in some suffering and efforts, they should be undertaken as it is the only means of getting rid of the karma. He compares it to the efforts and pains undertaken by a businessman to earn profit, which makes him happy. In the same way the austerities and penances are blissful to an ascetic who desires emancipation. See Haribhadrasūri, Sinha, Ashok Kumar, & Jain, Sagarmal (2000) p. 47)

While admitting the complexity and sophistication of the Jain doctrine, Padmanabh Jaini compares it with that of Hindu doctrine of rebirth and points out that the Jain seers are silent on the exact moment and mode of rebirth, that is, the re-entry of soul in womb after the death. The concept of nitya-nigoda, which states that there are certain categories of souls who have always been nigodas, is also criticized. According to Jainism, nigodas are lowest form of extremely microscopic beings having momentary life spans, living in colonies and pervading the entire universe. According to Jaini, the entire concept of nitya-nigoda undermines the concept of karma, as these beings clearly would not have had prior opportunity to perform any karmically meaningful actions.

Karma is also criticised on the grounds that it leads to the dampening of spirits with men suffering the ills of life because the course of one's life is determined by karma. It is often maintained that the impression of karma as the accumulation of a mountain of bad deeds looming over our heads without any recourse leads to fatalism. However, as Paul Dundas puts it, the Jain theory of karma does not imply lack of free will or operation of total deterministic control over destinies. Furthermore, the doctrine of karma does not promote fatalism amongst its believers on account of belief in personal responsibility of actions and that austerities could expatiate the evil karmas and it was possible to attain salvation by emulating the life of the Jinas.

== See also ==
- Karma
- Karma in Buddhism
- Karma in Hinduism
