= Kashaya (Jainism) =

Passions which must be purged

In Jainism, kashaya (kaṣāya; loose translation: Passion) are aspects of a person that can be gained during their worldly life. According to the Jaina religion, as long as a person has Kashayas, they will not escape the cycle of life and death. There are four different kinds of Kashayas, each being able to gain their own kinds of intensity.

== Overview ==
According to the Jain text Sarvārthasiddhi, "He who has passions causes injury to himself by himself. Whether injury is then caused to other living beings or not, it is immaterial."

Spiritually, the goal of Jainism is to rid oneself of the worldly life and become free from the cycle of reincarnation. When one develops attachment or passions, this hinders the spiritual progress of their soul. Jainas believe that by reacting without passion and staying tranquil, one can break the cycle which forms more karma.

== The Four Kashayas ==
The four kaṣāya are krodha (anger), lobha (greed), mana (ego) and maya (deceit). Out of the many causes of bondage, emotions or passions are considered as the main cause of bandha or bondage. The karmas are literally bound on account of the stickiness of the soul due to existence of various passions or mental dispositions. The passions like anger, pride, deceit and greed are called sticky (kaṣāyas) because they act like glue in making karmic particles stick to the soul resulting in bandha. The karmic inflow on account of yoga driven by passions and emotions cause a long term inflow of karma prolonging the cycle of reincarnations. On the other hand, the karmic inflows on account of actions that are not driven by passions and emotions have only a transient, short-lived karmic effect. Hence the ancient Jain texts talk of subduing these negative emotions: Negating kashayas can be done by remembering the opposites of kasahayas: the opposite of Krodha (Anger) is Kshama (Forgiveness). To avoid the kashaya of krodha, one needs to remember to forgive. The opposite of lobha (greed) is Daan (Charity), one needs to remember to give away. The opposite of Mana (Ego) is humility, one needs to be humble. The opposite of Deceit is honesty, one needs to be honest in all conditions in order to repudiate the kashaya of deceit.

The most difficult to overcome of the kashayas is that of Greed.

When one wishes that which is good for him, he should get rid of the four faults—anger, pride, deceit and greed—which increase the evil. Anger and pride when not suppressed, and deceit and greed when arising: all these four black passions water the roots of re-birth.

—Daśavaikālika sūtra, 8:36–39

== Levels of Intensity ==
- Anantanubadh (Extremely Severe): This holds back one's ability to have correct beliefs/proper conduct.
- Apratyakhanavarana (Severe): This holds back partial renunciation but does not affect true belief. While it is active, one cannot take partial vows.
- Pratyakhanavarana (Moderate): This holds back total renunciation, but does not affect correct belief and partial renunciation. While it is active, partial renunciation is possible, but monkhood is not.
- Sanjvalana (Slight): This holds back the attainment of total correct conduct, but does not affect right belief and monkhood. While it is active, initiation into monkhood and spiritual progress are possible, but becoming a vitragi is not.

The degrees of strength of the kasayas are illustrated by examples. The 4 species of anger are to be likened unto a line drawn in stone, in earth, in dust and in water. The first can only be removed with great effort, each following one always more easily. Likewise also, the lifelong enduring anger is only combated in its effect with exceeding strength and difficulty whilst the effect of the three remaining species accordingly diminishes in power and can, therefore, also more easily be destroyed. The degrees of pride are to be likened unto a pillar of stone, a bone, a piece of wood, and the vine of a creeper; the inflexibility correspondingly decreases. The species of deceitfulness are to be compared to a bamboo root, the horn of a ram, the urine of a cow, and a piece of wood. The crookedness of each of these is removed more easily than in the one preceding it. (The zig zag line of the cow's urine disappears through the influence of wind and weather.) The degrees of greed correspond to scarlet colour, to greater or smaller dirt, and to a spot of turmeric, which soil a garment: the scarlet is hardly removable, the dirt with more or less trouble, and the spot of turmeric can be removed with ease.

== See also ==
- Karma in Jainism
- Jain philosophy
- Five Thieves (Sikhism)
- Six Enemies (Hinduism)
- Kleshas (Buddhism)

== Sources ==
- S.A. Jain (1992), Reality (Second ed.), Jwalamalini Trust, " This article incorporates text from this source, which is in the public domain."
- Sangave, Vilas Adinath (1980), Jain Community: A Social Survey (2nd ed.), Bombay: Popular Prakashan, ISBN 978-0-317-12346-3
