= Mithyātva =

Falsity in Sanskrit philosophy

Mithyātva means "false belief", and is an important concept in Jainism and Hinduism. Mithyātva, states Jayatirtha, cannot be easily defined as 'indefinable', 'non-existent', 'something other than real', 'which cannot be proved, produced by avidya or as its effect', or as 'the nature of being perceived in the same locus along with its own absolute non-existence'.

Mithyātva is a concept in Jainism distinguishing right knowledge from false knowledge, and parallels the concepts of Avidya in the Vedanta school of Hinduism, Aviveka in its Samkhya school, and Maya in Buddhism.

The opposite of mithyātva (false belief) is samyaktva (right belief).

== Hinduism ==
Mithyātva is a concept found in some schools of Hinduism. Other concepts in Hinduism, similar in meaning to mithyātva, include the concepts of Avidya in the Vedanta school of Hinduism, Aviveka in its Samkhya school.

Ignorance begets aviveka (lack of correct, discriminative knowledge) states Samkhya school of Hinduism. One engages in deeds, good and bad, due to aviveka, earns punya or becomes a victim of sin and is reborn. Aviveka also means lack of reason or imprudence or indiscretion. Avidya is related concept in Vedanta school of Hinduism. Avidya and aviveka give dukkha i.e. suffering.

Madhusūdana Sarasvatī in his Advaita-siddhi gives five definitions of mithyātva which term is derived from mithya meaning false or indeterminable. False is something that appears and is later negated or contradicted; the unreal is never an object of experience, the concept of unreal is self-contradictory. Falsity is defined as – not being the locus of either reality or unreality, it is distinct from both reality and unreality. In practice, mithyātva has three means, – a) that which does not exist in three divisions of time, past, present and future; b) that which is removable by knowledge; and c) that which is identical with the object of sublation. Whereas mithya is other than real but not real, mithyātva is identical with sublatability. Mithyatva may also be understood as that which is negated even where it is found to exist. The followers of the Advaita School contend that the world-appearance is negated by Brahman-knowledge and hence it is illusory. To the followers of Vishishtadvaitavada, mithya is the apprehension of an object as different from its own nature.

The Advaita School considers mithyātva to mean falsity of the world. Disappearance (nivrtti) is the necessary presupposition of mithyātva because what is falsely perceived ceases to exist with the dawn of right knowledge. But, mithya or falsity, or mithyātva or falsity of the world, cannot be easily defined as indefinable or non-existent or something other than real or which cannot be proved or produced by avidya (or as its effect) or as the nature of being perceived in the same locus along with its own absolute non-existence. The opponents of the Advaita do not accept the contention that Atman is simply consciousness and cannot be the substratum of knowledge, and they insist that existence as the logical concomitant of the absence of non-existence and vice versa, with these two being mutually exclusive predicates, must be admitted. The opposite of unreality must be reality.

According to Advaita anything which is both cognized and sublated is mithya. Mithyātva is negated even where it is found. The illusoriness of the world is itself illusory. Once Brahman-knowledge arises both the cognizer and the cognized disappear.

The proof of unreality is impermanence, the permanent one is the Sole Reality. Mithyātva is apparent reality; at the level of ultimate truth, when, through the understanding of the mithyātva of all limiting adjuncts (upadhis) of name and form i.e., those that pertain to the individual body-mind (tvam) and as well to the lordship of Brahman (tat), everything is seen to be not an other to pure Awareness, the distinctions of Jiva and Ishvara no longer apply, and it is the param Brahman, the very essential of the Lord Itself, that is the final reality. In Advaita the method to reveal the unreality (mithyātva) of things involves the idea of change and permanence i.e. what deviates and what persists.

Mithyātva means 'illusoriness'. Advaita maintains that Brahman alone is real, the plurality of the universe is because the universe is illusory, the universe can be cognized; whatever that is cognized is illusory. The universe is different from the real as well as the real, the universe is indeterminable. Vedanta Desika refutes this contention because there is no such entity which is neither real nor unreal. The universe which is different from Brahman is inseparably related to Brahman. Badarayana (Brahma Sutra III.ii.28) declares that between the Jiva and Brahman there is difference as well as non-difference like the relation of light to its substratum or source on account of both being luminous, one being limited and the other all-pervading, the all-pervading is real and immortal. Rishi Damano Yamayana (Rig Veda X.xvi.4) insists that all should know about that part of the body which is immortal; the immortal part of the body is the Atman or Brahman, it is called a part because without it there cannot be life in one's body. Vacaspati of the Bhamati school states that whereas illusion conceals, mithyātva signifies 'concealment', the real nature of the cognized object is concealed resulting in non-apprehension of difference between the real and the unreal objects. Padmapada of the Vivarna school adds to the sense of concealment the sense of inexpressibility, thus hinting at the sublatability of illusion. If the term anirvacaniya is defined by the Advaita as the nature of being different from sat and asat in essence, which is the nature of mithyātva, then the element of difference must be real. Even though Jayatirtha states that there is no bar on the validity of the experience of difference, but the fact remains that difference cannot be an attribute of objects. Madhavacharya concludes that difference is not something that falls outside the content of an object or what is generally considered to constitute its essence which in perception is the sum total of its distinction from others. The perception of an object is the same as the perception of its difference from all others.

== Jainism ==
Mithyātva is an important concept on false knowledge in Jainism. The Jaina scholar Hemachandra defined mithyātva as "belief in false divinities, false gurus and false scriptures".

Jainism describes seven types of beliefs - mithyātva, sasvadana-samyaktva, mishra-mithyatva, kashopashmika-samyaktva, aupshamika-samyaktva, vedak-samyaktva and kshayik-samyaktva. Mithyātva, meaning false or wrong belief, is the soul's original and beginning less state of deluded world-view, at which stage the soul is in a spiritual slumber, unaware of its own bondage.

Mithyātva or "false belief, delusion" are of five kinds in Jainism, according to one classification:

1. Ekanta (one sided belief, not considering other sides or aspects for truth),
2. Viparita (belief in the opposite of what is right),
3. Vinaya (universally accepting all right or wrong belief/religion without examining them, attending only to conduct),
4. Samsaya (when there is doubt whether a course is right or wrong, unsettled belief, skepticism), and
5. Ajnana (indifference to right or wrong belief).

Svetambara Jains classify categories of false belief under mithyātva differently: Abhigrahika (belief limited to their own scriptures that they can defend, but refusing to study and analyse other scriptures); Anabhigrahika (belief that equal respect must be shown to all gods, teachers, scriptures); Abhiniviseka (belief of those who can discern but refuse to do so from preconceptions); Samsayika (state of hesitation or uncertainty between various conflicting, inconsistent beliefs); and Anabhogika (innate, default beliefs that a person has not thought through on one's own).

Digambara Jains classify categories of false belief under mithyātva into seven: Ekantika (absolute, one sided belief), Samsayika (uncertainty, doubt whether a course is right or wrong, unsettled belief, skepticism), Vainayika (belief that all gods, gurus and scriptures are alike), Grhita (belief derived purely from habits or default, no self analysis), Viparita (belief that true is false, false is true, everything is relative or acceptable), Naisargika (belief that living beings are devoid of consciousness and cannot discern right from wrong), Mudha-drsti (belief leading violence and anger to tarnish or damage thoughts, divine, guru or dharma).

Mithyātva is one of three things, in Jainism, that are harmful stimuli and that distract a person from attaining right belief and correct knowledge. The other two things that distract, are Maya (deceit), and Nidana (hankering after fame and worldly pleasures).

One Jaina text lists 28 kinds of mohaniya (deluding) karmas that prevent the true perception of reality and the purity of the soul, the darsana mohaniya karman which function to prevent a soul's insight into its own nature and therefore, deemed destructive, are mithyātva karman. The term, mithyātva, meaning 'perversity', is generally used to denote the idea of avidya along with mithyadarsana or mithyadrsti (wrong view), darsanamoha (delusion of vision), moha (delusion) etc.;. The state of mithyatva is manifested as a fundamental tendency to see things other than as they really are (Tattva Sutra 8:9). Passions such as Aversion (dvesa) and Attachment (raga), which are also called pursuers from the limitless past (anantanubandhi), operate in conjunction with mithyatva. Mithyātva is the one-sided or perverted world-view which generates new layers of karma and considered in Jainism as the root of human arrogance.

== Buddhism ==
Mithyātva is not a common term in Buddhism, but where mentioned implies deceit. The more common term used is Maya. Mithyātva, according to Abhidharmakosa, means rebirth in the hells or as an animal or as a preta. Ratnagotravibhagha terms mithyātva as the state of evil.
