= Kanji Swami =

Indian Jain teacher (1890–1980)

Personal life
- Born: 21 April 1890 Umrala, Bhavnagar State, British India
- Died: 28 November 1980 (aged 90) Mumbai, Maharashtra
- Parents: Motichand Bhai (father); Ujamba (mother)
- Notable work(s): Jain scholar, philosopher and spiritual leader

Religious life
- Religion: Jainism
- Sect: Digambar

Kanji Swami (1890–1980) was a teacher of Jainism who founded the Kanji Swami Pantha. While ordained in the Sthānakavāsī monastic order of the Shvetambaras, he was deeply influenced by the Samayasāra, attributed to Kundakunda, and by Shrimad Rajchandra, and lectured on these teachings for 45 years to comprehensively elaborate on the philosophy described by Kundakunda and others. He was given the title of "Koh-i-Noor of Kathiawar" by the people who were influenced by his religious teachings and philosophy.

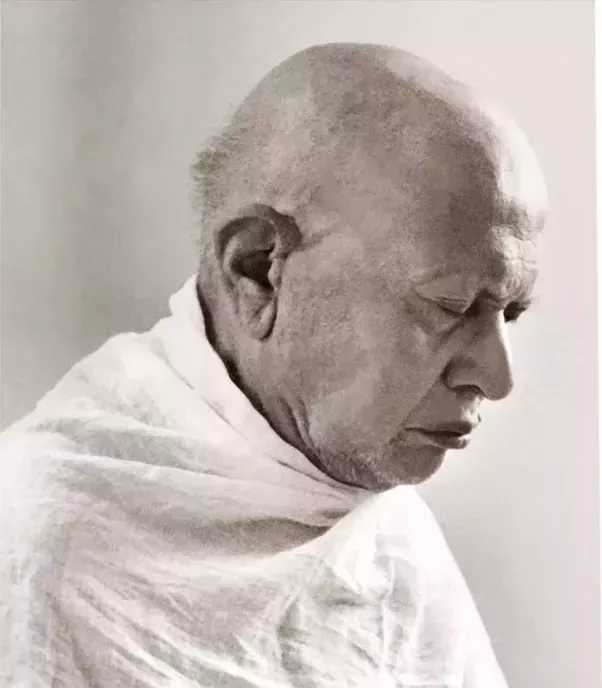
Gurudev Shree Kanji Swami

== Biography ==
=== Early years ===
Kanji Swami was born in Umrala, a small village in the Kathiawar region of Gujarat, in 1890 to a Sthanakvasi family. Although an able pupil in school, he always had an intuition that the worldly teachings was not something that he was looking out for. His mother died when he was thirteen and he lost his father at the age of seventeen. After this, he started looking after his father's shop. He used the frequent periods of lull in the shop in reading various books on religion and spirituality. Turning down the proposals of marriage, he confided in his brother that he wanted to remain celibate and take renunciation.

=== Renunciation and later life ===
Kanji Swami became a Sthānakavāsī monastic in 1913 under Hirachanda. During the ceremony, while riding on an elephant, he inauspiciously tore his robe, which was later believed to be an ill omen for his monastic career. Being a believer in self effort for achieving emancipation, he quickly became a learned and famous monk and, backed by his seventeen renditions of the Bhagavati Sutra. He was known as "Koh-i-Noor of Kathiawar" (the gem of the Kathiawad region).

During 1921, he read Kundakunda's Samayasāra, which influenced him greatly. He also studied writings of Pandit Todarmal and Shrimad Rajchandra. Other influences were Amritchandra and Banarasidas. During his discourses, he began to incorporate the ideas picked from these studies and began to lead a kind of double life, nominally a Sthānakavāsī monastic but referring to Digambara texts.

His assertions that "vows, giving and fasting were ultimately worthless if performed without any understanding of the soul" did not endear him to the Sthānakavāsī community. He left Sthānakavāsī monastic life and proclaimed himself a celibate Digambara lay scholar at Songadh in Gujarat in 1934.

Kanji Swami elaborated on the Kundakunda-narrative, first attested by Jayasena (ca. 1150–1200), by claiming that, in a previous life, he was present when Kundakunda visited Mahavideha receiving the teachings from Jina Simandhara which gave Kundakunda insight into the true nature of the soul. This presence was suggested to him by Campabahen Mataji, a female disciple, who said that she also had been present then. His lectures were recorded on tapes and have been published. His emphasis was on Nishcaya Naya, the higher level of truth, over Vyavahara Naya, ordinary life.

Kanji Swami died on 28 November 1980 at Mumbai.

== Teachings ==
Kanji incorporated Digambara mystical teachings inspired by Kundakunda and Shrimad Rajchandra.

In the Pravacanasara Kundakunda states that a Jain mendicant should meditate on "I, the pure self". Anyone who considers his body or possessions as "I am this, this is mine" is on the wrong road, while one who meditates, thinking the antithesis and "I am not others, they are not mine, I am one knowledge" is on the right road to meditating on the "soul, the pure self".

Kanji's teachings posit that the discriminative knowledge between the "true pure knowledge self" and "the other" (body, mind, and the material world) is the true and the only procedure of self-realization and the path of liberation. According to Kanji Swami, the practice of this discriminative knowledge of "true pure knowledge self" and "the other" is as originally practiced and described in works attributed to Kundakunda, namely Samaysara (Essence of Self), Pravachanasara (Essence of Doctrine), and Pancastikayasara (The five cosmic constituents) and their commentaries. (Note: Gatha 1, Gatha 8, Gatha 11, Gatha 13, Gatha 38, Gatha 73, Gatha 320 and Gatha 412 of Samayasara, and Gatha 80, Gatha 114 and Gatha 172 of Pravachanasara, are considered particularly important because they include techniques of realizing pure self.)

In an interview in 1977, Kanji denied being hostile to the traditional Jain monasticism, and regarded monastics as personifying the fundamental principles of Jainism. However, he also pointed out that taking up formal initiation and behavioural practices, like the abandonment of clothes of Digambara monks, and of other possessions, could not make an individual a true monastic unless he had abandoned internal possessions as well.

== Kanji Swami Panth ==
Kanji Panth is a lay movement within Jainism, nominally belonging to the Śvetāmbara but inspired by the Digambara scholar Kundakunda and Shrimad Rajchandra (1867–1901), though "lacking a place in any Digambara ascetic lineage descending from Kundakunda."

Kanji Swami has many followers in the Jain diaspora. They generally regard themselves simply as Digambara Jains, more popularly known as Mumukshu, following the mystical tradition of Kundakunda and Pandit Todarmal. According to Neerah Jain, the Kanji Path has created a sharp division within Jainism in northern and central India, as its emphasis on niścayanaya or the ‘ultimate perspective’ violates the Anekantaveda, the principle that truth has many sides. Bauer notes that "[in] recent years there has been a convergence of the Kanji Swami Panth and the Shrimad Rajcandra movement, part of trend toward a more eucumenical and less sectarian Jainism among educated, mobile Jains living overseas."

=== Temples ===
The Digambara Jaina Svādhyāya Mandira was built in 1937. It houses the text Samayasāra in the main temple and the words of Kundakunda's five main treatises have been engraved on its walls. A temple dedicated to Jain Tirthankara Simandhara was consecrated in 1941. Kanji Swami travelled throughout India where he gave discourses and consecrated many temples. Songadh is a major centre.

There is no centralized management of temples. All Temples are managed independently by a local board of trustees. Apart from numerous temples in India, temples exist in Brampton, Canada; Harrow, London; and Mombasa, Kenya.

== See also ==
- Taran Panth

== Sources ==
- Balcerowicz, Piotr (2023). "Kundakunda, A 'Collective Author': Deconstruction of a Myth". In Flugel, Peter; De Jonckheere, Heleen; Sohnen-Tieme, Renate (eds.). Pure Soul: The Jaina Spiritual Traditions. Centre of Jain Studies, SOAS.
- Bauer, Jerome (2004). "Kanji Swami (1890-1980)". In Jestice, Phyllis G. (ed.). Holy People of the World: A Cross-Cultural Encyclopedia. Vol. 1. ABC-CLIO. p. 464. ISBN 9781576073551.
- Dundas, Paul (2002), The Jains, Library of religious beliefs and practices, Routledge, ISBN 978-0-415-26605-5
- Jain, Ravindra K. (1999). The Kanji Swami Panth, The universe as audience: metaphor and community among the Jains of North India. Indian Institute of Advanced Study. ISBN 8185952647.
- Johnson, W.J. (1995), Harmless Souls: Karmic Bondage and Religious Change in Early Jainism with Special Reference to Umāsvāti and Kundakunda, Motilal Banarsidass, ISBN 978-81-208-1309-0
- Long, Jeffery D. (2013). Jainism: An Introduction. I.B.Tauris. ISBN 978-0-85771-392-6.
- Shaw, Richard. "Kanji swami Panth". University of Cumbria. Division of Religion and philosophy.
