= Songadh, Bhavnagar district =

Coordinates: 21°42′52″N 71°53′11″E

Songadh is a census town in Bhavnagar district of Saurashtra in Gujarat, India. As of the 2011 Census of India, it had a population of 6,027 across 1252 households. It is 8 km from Sihor town and 28 km from Bhavnagar town. The Songadh Jain temple is a notable landmark in the town.

== Importance in Jainism ==
Kanji Swami, a mystical teacher of Jainism, was born into Śvētāmbara Sthānakavāsī and converted to a celibate Digambara lay scholar under influence of Kundakunda & Pandit Todarmal, at Songadh in 1934. Sonagadh became birthplace for Kanji Panth. Kanji Swami, spent about forty years at Songadh so the village became one of the most important pilgrimage for Kanji Panth.

Songadh along with Palitana, Girnar, Naliya, Kathara, Idar, Tarangaji, and Ahmedabad are planned to be promoted as Gujarat Jain circuit by Gujarat tourism department.
