= Songadh Jain temple =

Songadh Tirtha
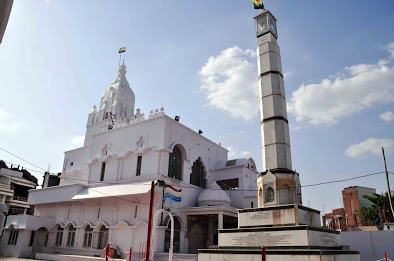
- Paramagam Mandir

Religion
- Affiliation: Jainism
- Festival: Mahavir Jayanti
- Governing body: Shri Kund Kund Kahan Digambar Jain Swadhyay Mandir Trust

Location
- Location: Bhavnagar, Gujarat
- Interactive map of Songadh Tirtha
- Coordinates: 21°42′48″N 71°53′4.5″E

Architecture
- Established: 1930
- Temple: 8

The Songadh Jain temple is a historical temple complex in the town of Songadh, in Bhavnagar district the Saurashtra region in Gujarat, India. It is 8 km from Sihor town and 28 km from Bhavnagar town.

== Importance ==
Kanji Swami, a mystical teacher of Jainism, was born into Śvētāmbara Sthānakavāsī and converted to a celibate Digambara lay scholar under influence of Kundakunda & Pandit Todarmal, at Songadh in 1934. Kanji Swami, spent about forty five years at Songadh so the village became one of the most important pilgrimage for Digambar Jain people.

Songadh along with Palitana, Girnar, Naliya, Kathara, Idar, Tarangaji, and Ahmedabad are planned to be promoted as Gujarat Jain circuit by Gujarat tourism department.

== Overview ==
The temple complex consist of eight temples. Svadhyaya Mandir or study temple, is the first temple in the temple complex built in 1937. The temple is a white marble structure with teachings of Kundakund engraved on the walls and embossed on golden leaf. Jinendra Dharmasabha houses a samavasarana, the divine preaching hall of the Tirthankaras, of Simandhara based on the description by Mahavideha. The temple has murals with depiction of the knowledge of true doctrine cascading like water steam from Simandhara to Kundakunda and Kundakunda to Kanji Swami.

In 2010, a 41.5 feet idol of Lord Bahubali was also installed here.

Other temples

1. Paramagam Mandir, literally meaning Temple of Sacred Texts. Walls of this temple are carved with the Digambar Jain sacred texts of Samayasāra
2. Jin Mandir
3. Nandishwar Deep Mandir
4. Manastambha
5. Kanji Swami Samadhi Mandir
6. Champa Ben Samadhi Mandir

== Gallery ==
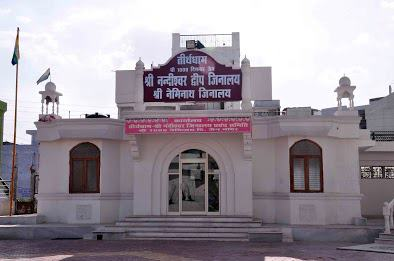
Nandishwar Deep Mandir front view

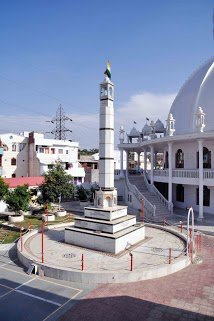
Manasthambha

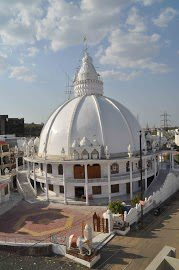
Jinendra Dharmasabha

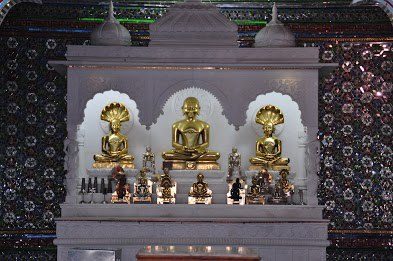
Main vedi of Nandishwar Deep Mandir

== See also ==
- Jainism in Gujarat
