= Hemraj Pande =

Indian author

- Works: Pravachansar (Prose) (Translation); Pravachansar (Poetry) (Translation); Bhaktamar Stotra (Prose) (Translation); Bhaktamar Stotra (Poetry) (Translation); Chaurasi Bol (Sitpat Chaurasi Bol); Parmatmaprakash (Translation); Panchastikay (Translation); Karmakand (Translation); Sugandh Dashmi Vrat Katha; Naychakra (Translation); Gurupuja; Nemirajmati Jakhdi; Rohini Vrat Katha; Nandishvar Vrat Katha; Rajmati Chunari; Samaysara (Translation) etc.

Hemraj Pande (Hemarāja/Hemrāj Pande) (17th century CE) was an Indian author belonging to the Digambara Jain Agrawal merchant caste & Garg Gotra. He was from Agra. He had a daughter named Jainulade(Jaini) who came to be mother of another poet legend Bulakidas making Hemraj Bulakis maternal Grandfather. He had written commentaries on numerous Jain texts. Being a disciple of Rupchand Pande, a thinker who had settled in Agra in 1635 & delivered sermons on Gommatasara. As a ‘pande’ – a vernacular form of the Sanskrit paṇḍitā – or ‘pandit‘, Hemraj could have been a lay Jain administering the temple, appointed by a Bhattaraka.

He wrote a commentary on Pravachanasara of Kundakunda in 1652 based on the commentary on Samayasara by Rajmall. He also wrote the differences between Jain sects, Digambara and Śvetāmbara, in Chaurasi Bol (Eighty-Four Disputes) in the same year. He wrote these texts on the request of Kanvarpal or Kaurnpal of Agra. Many of his other works, apart from the ones in the list, are also archived & can be found in some of the religious book archives of North India. Hemraj was a close friend of Kaurapal or Kunvarapal, who is mentioned by Banarsidas in his autobiography, the Ardha-kathānaka. Surprisingly, Banarsidas does not include Hemraj among the prominent Digambara scholars in Agra. Hemraj is first mentioned by Hirananda, who describes him as ‘wise and cultivated’ in his Samavaraṇavidhāna.

He wrote some original works in Brajbhasha. He also translated Bhaktamara Stotra, a sixth century Jain composition, of Manatunga. This was done in the style of translation of Kalyanamandir stotra's by Banarsidas. He seems to have specialised in writing commentaries on texts by other scholars.
