= Banarasidas =

Mughal Indian writer, businessman and poet (1586–1643)

- Born: 1586; Jaunpur, Mughal Empire
- Died: 1643 (aged 56–57)
- Occupations: Businessman, poet
- Parent: Kharagsen (father)

Banarasidas (1586–1643) was a Shrimal Jain businessman and poet of Mughal India. He is known for his poetic autobiography – Ardhakathānaka, (The Half Story), composed in Braj Bhasa, an early dialect of Hindi linked with the region around Mathura. It is the first autobiography written in an Indian language. At the time, he was living in Agra and was 55 years old – the "half" story refers to the Jain tradition, where a "full" lifespan is 110 years.

== Life ==
Banarasidas was born in a Shrimal Jain family in 1587. His father Kharagsen was a jeweller in Jaunpur (now in Uttar Pradesh). He received basic education in letters and numbers from a local Brahmin in Jaunpur for one year and then from another Brahmin named Pandit Devdatt at the age of 14. He further completed his higher studies in astrology and Khandasphuta, a work on mathematics. He studied lexicographical texts like Namamala (synonyms) and Anekarthakosha (words with multiple meanings). He also studied alankara (techniques of poetic embellishment) and Laghukoka (a text on erotics).

He later shifted to Agra in 1610-1611 for trade. He started his poetic and singing career with poems like Qutban's Mirigavati (1503 CE) and Manjhan's Madhumalati (1545 CE), which were composed by Sufi poets in Hindavi verses. He was influenced by the sermons of Gommatasara in 1635 by Rupchand Pande, spiritual teacher of Hemraj Pande.

He was one of the leading proponents of the Adhyatma movement, which eventually led to the Terapanth sect of the Digambar Jains. Banarasidas appears to have been a better poet than a businessman; at one stage he relates how after incurring several business losses, his wife gave him twenty rupees that she had saved up. At times a friend of the Nawab of Jaunpur Chin Qilich Khan, at other times persecuted, he had to flee to other cities. Despite the long life expectancy inherent in the title of his work Ardhakathānaka, Banarasidas died two years after writing it, in 1643.

== Works ==
Banarasidas is known for his works, Moha Vivek Yuddha, Banārasi Nāmamāla (1613) Banārasivilāsa (1644), Samayasāra Nātaka (1636) and Ardhakathanaka (1641) in Braj Bhasa. He translated Kalyanamandir stotra's. The Banārasi Nāmamāla is a lexicographic work based on Dhananjaya's Nāmamāla in Sanskrit. The Banārasivilāsa is an anthology of his poetic works collected by Pandit Jagjivan. It was completed in 1644. The Samayasāra Nātaka is a work on the Jain philosophy, largely based on Kundakunda's Samayasāra (a Digambara text), its Sanskrit commentary by Amritchandra and Hindi commentary by Rajamalla.

The Ardhakathānaka is his autobiography which describes his transition from an unruly youth, to a religious realization by the time the work was composed. The work is notable for many details of life in Mughal times - Banarasidas lived during the reign of Akbar, Jahangir and Shahjahan.

He appears to have been an occasional chess partner of Emperor Shahjahan (this is not mentioned in the Ardhakathanaka though). The following stanzas describe the effect of Akbar's sudden death in 1605 – the uncertainty of succession induced widespread fear among the wealthier classes:

ghar-ghar dar-dar kiye kapaaT,
haTavaanii nahi.n baithe haaT.

bhale vastra aru bhuushaNa bhale,
te sab gaaDhe dharatii tale.

ghar-ghar sabani visaahe shashhtra,
logan pahine moTe vastra.

u.nch niich kouu nahi.n pahichaan,
dhanii daridrii bhaye samaan.

Translation:

At all the houses, doors were kept closed,
merchants stopped sitting at the shops.

Nice clothes and ornaments were
all buried under the ground.

People started keeping their swords ready,
they started wearing coarse clothes.

You could not recognize the status of a person,
the rich and poor looked alike.

== Recent interest ==
Pioneering work on Banarasi and his trio of works, Banarasi Vilasa, Samayasara Nataka and Ardhakathanaka was carried out by Pandit Nathuram Premi in the early decades of the 20th century.

Mukund Lath's translation of Ardhakathanaka was published in 1981 under the title, Half a Tale.

Jérôme Petit completed a study and French translation of the Ardhakathanaka under Nalini Balbir of the Sorbonne Institute of France.

Rupert Snell, of University of Texas at Austin, USA not only wrote an article on Banarasi, but also encouraged Chloe Martinez of Santa Barbara to work on Banarasi.

Rohini Chowdhury's Hindi translation of Banarasidas' Ardhakathanaka has been published by Penguin Books India, 2007. ISBN 978-0-14-310056-0. A new English translation by Chowdhury has been published by Penguin Classics in 2009 ISBN 978-0143100546. Chowdhury's translations were inspired by Rupert Snell, who also wrote the Introduction to the work.

== See also ==
- List of Jains
- Champat Rai Jain
