= Pravachanasara =

Religious text of Jainism

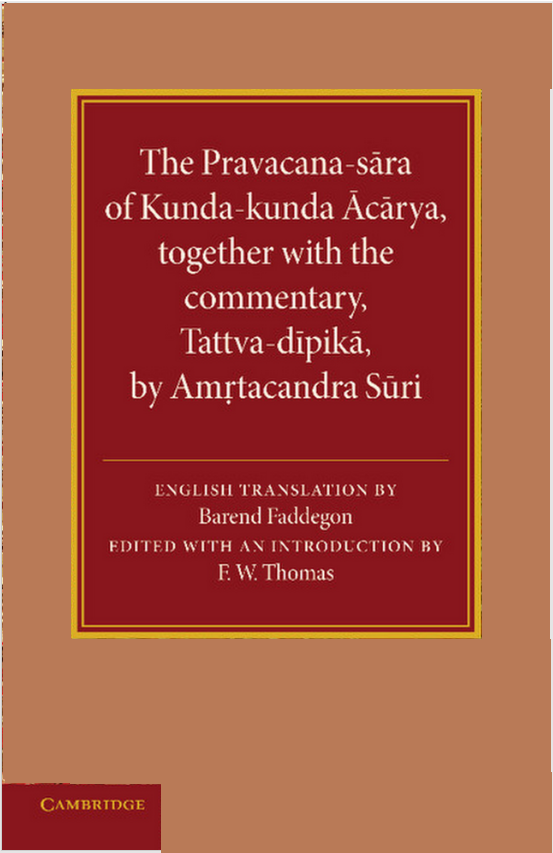
- Text along with commentary of Pravachanasara in English

Information
- Religion: Jainism
- Author: Kundakunda
- Language: Prakrit
- Period: 2nd Century CE or later / 1934 Translated in English
- Chapters: 3
- Verses: 275

Pravacanasāra is a text composed by Jain monk Kundakunda in the second century CE or later. The title means "Essence of the Doctrine" or "Essence of the Scripture", and it largely deals with the correct ascetic and spiritual behavior based on his dualism premise. Kundakunda provides a rationale for nudity among Digambara monks in this text, stating that the duality of self and of others means "neither I belong to others, nor others belong to me, therefore nothing is mine and the ideal way for a monk to live is the way he was born". The text is written in Prakrit language, and it consists of three chapters and 275 verses.

A modern English translation was published by Vijay K. Jain in 2020.

== Content ==
First chapter consists of 92 verses and it describes attributes of supreme individual consciousnesses and outlines first steps of achieving that status. Second chapter consists of 108 verses and it describes laws of interaction between space, time particles, elementary matter particles, compound matter particles, motion and individual consciousnesses in the Cosmos. Third chapter consists of 75 verses and it is aimed at delineating the bases of correct mendicant praxis.

== Commentaries ==
Acharya Amritchandra has written a commentary on Kundkund Acharya's Pravachansara titled Tattvadipika (i.e. the Lamp of Truth). Acharya Jayasena has also written a commentary on Pravachanasara titled Tatparyavritti (i.e. the Purport). Another commentary was written by Hemraj Pande in 1652 based on the commentary on Samayasara by Rajmall.

== See also ==
- List of Jain texts
