= Nemichandra =

Acharya Shri Nemichandra Siddhanta Chakravarty
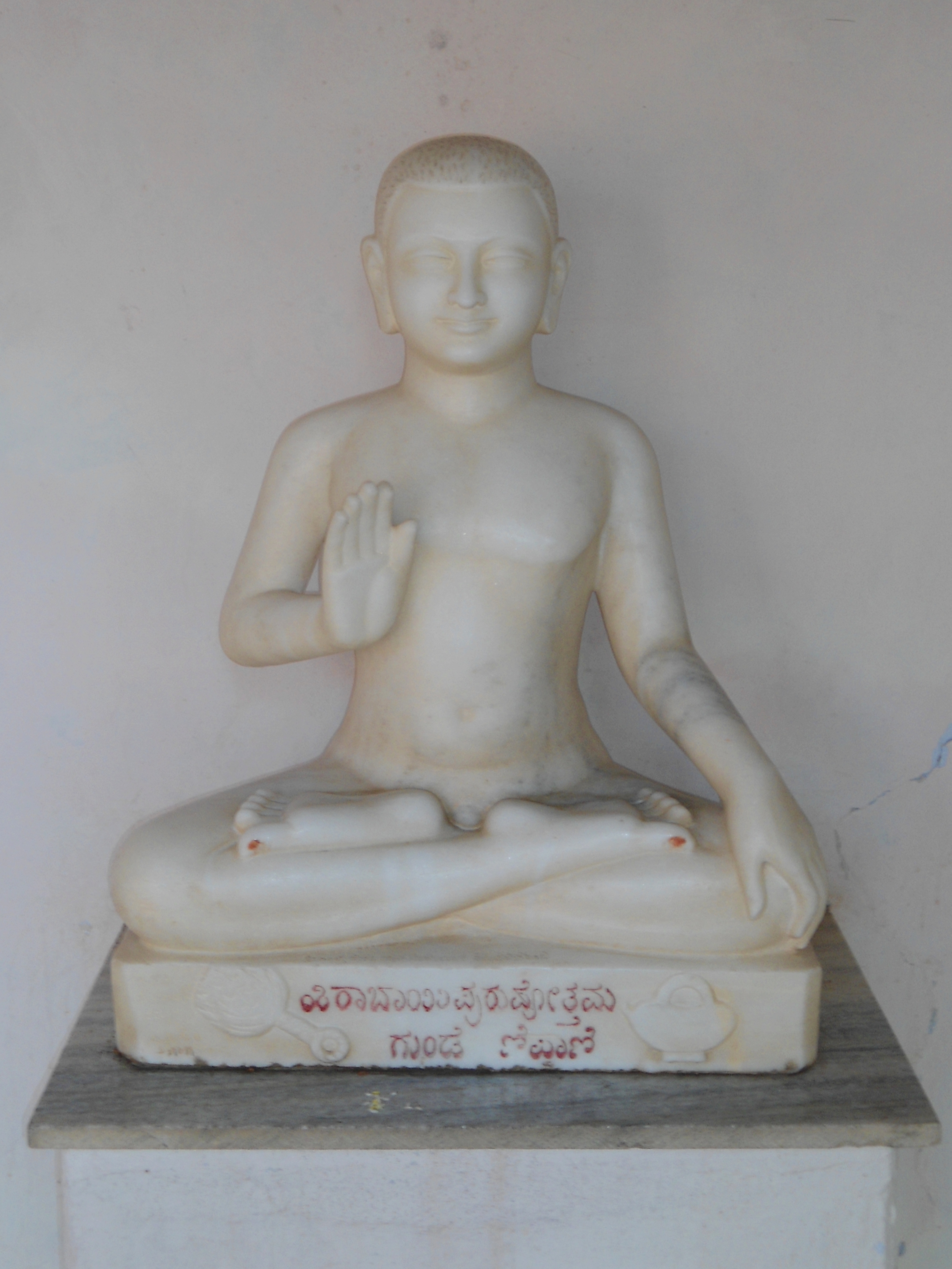
- Image of digambar acharya (head of the monastic order)

Personal life
- Born: 10th century
- Died: 10th century

Religious life
- Religion: Jainism
- Sect: Digambara

Nemichandra (fl. c. 975), also known by his epithet Siddhanta Chakravarty, was a Jain acharya from present-day India. He wrote several works including Dravyasamgraha, Gommatsāra (Jivakanda and Karmakanda), Trilokasara, Labdhisara and Kshapanasara.

== Life ==
Nemichandra flourished around 975. He was popularly known as "Siddhanta-Chakravarti" (i.e. the Paramount Lord of the Philosophy).

He was the spiritual teacher of Chavundaraya (Cāmuṇḍarāya) and their relation is expressed in the 1530 inscription in the enclosure of Padmavati temple, Nagar Taluka, Shimoga district.

Nemichandra supervised the abhisheka (consecration) of the Gommateshwara statue (on 13 March 980).

== Works ==
At the request of Chavundaraya, Nemichandra wrote Gommatsāra in 10th century, taking the essence of all available works of the great Acharyas. Gommatasara provides a detailed summary of Digambara doctrine.

He wrote Trilokasara based on the Tiloya Panatti, Labdhisara, Kshapanasara, Pratishthapatha and Pratishthatilaka. Abhaya-chandra (c. 1325) wrote a vyakhyana on Nemichandra's Triloka-sara. Indra-vama-deva wrote Trilokya-dipaka based on Nemichandra's Trailokya-sara, for Nemi-deva of the Puravata (or Pragvata) family.

Earlier scholars believed that Dravya-sangraha was also written by him, however, new research reveals that this compendium was written by Acharya Nemichandra Siddhantideva who was contemporary to the Paramara king Bhoja.

== See also ==
- Dravya (Jainism)
- Buddhism
