= Amritchandra =

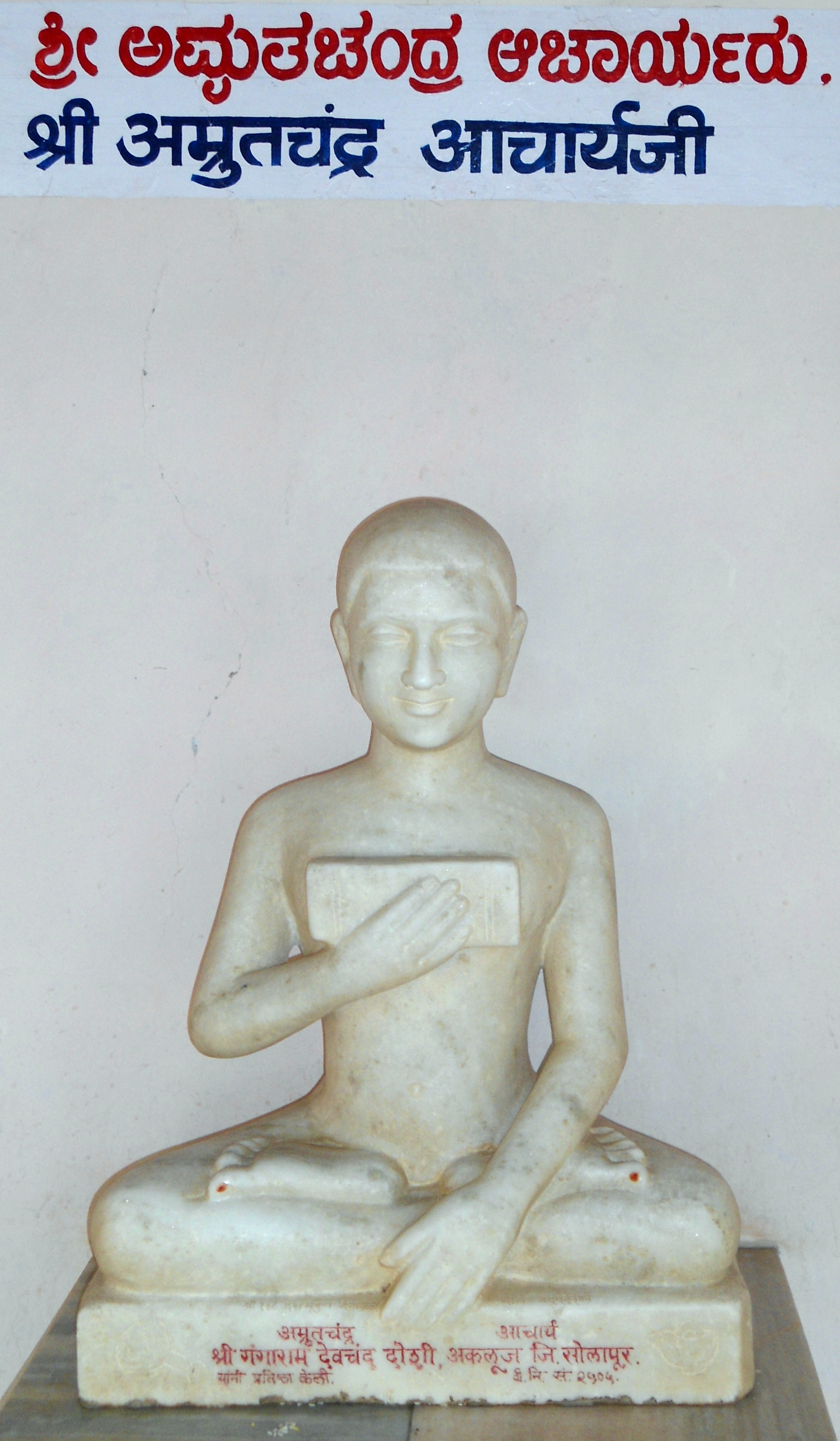

Personal life
- Flourished: 10th century CE
- Notable work: Puruşārthasiddhyupāya

Religious life
- Religion: Jainism

Amritchandra (f. 10th-century CE) was a Digambara Jain Acharya who wrote commentaries on Samayasāra called Atmakhyati and Samaysar Kalasha, Pravachanasara and Pancastikayasara. He also wrote independent books of Puruşārthasiddhyupāya and Tattvartha Sara. He wrote in Sanskrit language.
