= Konakondla =

- village
- Interactive map of Konakondla
- Location in Andhra Pradesh, India Konakondla (India)
- Coordinates: 15.1053°N 77.3640°E
- Country: India
- State: Andhra Pradesh
- District: Anantapur

Languages
  - Official: Telugu
- Time zone: UTC+5:30 (IST)
- Postal code: 515842
- Vehicle registration: AP
- Nearest city: Guntakal
- Lok Sabha constituency: Anantapur
- Vidhan Sabha constituency: Uravakonda

Konakondla is a very big village in Vajrakarur Taluk near to Guntakal in Anantapur district, Andhra Pradesh, India.

It is believed that this village was once famous for Jainism and Buddhism. There is some historical evidence in and around the village. From ancient times, this place has produced many gems and diamonds.

Almost 30000 people are living in konakondla. People's are celebrating utla teru on every year.

== Jainism ==
Konakondla is considered to be birthplace of one of the most influential digambara Jain monks, Kundakunda.
