= Gommatsāra =

Jain text written by Acharya Nemichandra Siddhant Chakravarti

- Gommatsara Jiva-Kanda (1st part of the Gommatsara)

Information
- Religion: Jainism
- Author: Acharya Nemichandra Siddhant Chakravarti
- Period: 10th century CE

Gommatsāra is one of the most important Jain texts authored by Acharya Nemichandra Siddhanta Chakravarti.

== History ==
Gommatsāra was written by Nemichandra in 10th century CE in Prakrit. It is based on the major Jain text, Shatkhandagam written by the Acharya Bhutabali and Acharya Pushpadant. Sermons on Gommatasara was delivered in 1635 by Rupchand Pande, teacher of Hemraj Pande.

== Content ==
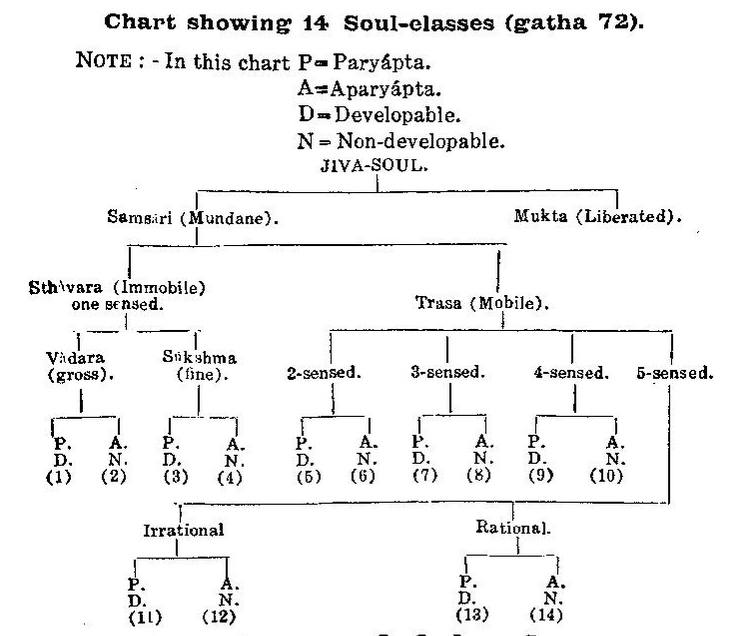
Classification of souls (gatha 72)

Gommatasara provides a detailed summary of Digambara doctrine. It is also called Pancha Sangraha, a collection of five topics:

1. That which is bound, i.e., the Soul (Bandhaka);
2. That which is bound to the soul;
3. That which binds;
4. The varieties of bondage;
5. The cause of bondage.

The first of these, namely, (Bandhaka) i. e., the mundane soul forms the subject-matter of Jiva Kanda (description of the soul). The other four form the subject-matter of Karma Kanda.

== See also ==
- Karma in Jainism
