= Acharya =

Guide or instructor in religious matters in Dharmic religion

In Indian religions and society, an acharya (Sanskrit: आचार्य, IAST: ācārya; Pali: ācariya) is a religious teacher in Hinduism and Buddhism and a spiritual guide to Hindus and Buddhists. The designation has different meanings in Hinduism, Buddhism and secular contexts.

Acharya is sometimes used to address an expert teacher or a scholar in any discipline, e.g.: Bhaskaracharya, the expert mathematician.

== Etymology ==
The Sanskrit phrase ācāraṁ grahāyati ācāraṁ dadāti iti vā means Acharya (or teacher) is the one who teaches good conduct to one's students. A female teacher is called an āchāryā (last ā long) and a male teacher's wife is called an achāryāni

== In Hinduism ==
The term 'Acharya' has numerous definitions. Hinduism frequently uses the terms "acharya" and "guru" interchangeably. According to the Dharma Shastras, acharya is the one who imparts knowledge of the entire Veda to a student and performs upanayana sanskar.

According to Nirukta, an ancillary discipline associated with the Vedas, an acharya is an individual who imparts knowledge to a student, collects wealth from the student, and helps pupils understand behaviour based on moral norms.

According to Manusmriti, the individual who, having initiated a pupil, teaches him the Veda along with the ritualistic and esoteric treatises—him they call, ‘Ācārya,’ ‘Preceptor’—(140).

Other authors' definitions:

- Gautama-Dharmasūtra, 1.10-11. — ‘The Upanayana is the second birth. He from whom this is received is the Ācārya.’
- Āpastamba-Dharmasūtra, 1.2.24-27.—‘He from whom one gathers (learns, ācinoti) his duties is the Ācārya; he brings about the essence of knowledge; this constitutes the highest birth.’
- Vaśiṣṭha-smṛti, 3. 24.—‘He who, having initiated him, teaches him the entire Veda is the Ācārya.’
- Viṣṇu-smṛti, 29.1.—‘He who, having initiated the pupil and taught him the observances, teaches him the Veda, should be known as the Ācārya.’
- Yājñavalkya-smṛti, 1.34.—‘He who, after initiating, teaches the Veda is called the Ācārya.’

=== Prominent acharyas in the Hindu tradition ===
- Adi Sankaracharya
- Ramanujacharya
- Madhvacharya
- Nimbarkacharya
- Vallabhacharya
- Chaitanya Mahaprabhu
- Acharya Sandipani

== Buddhism ==
In Buddhism, an ācārya (Pali: ācariya) is a senior teacher or master. In Theravada it is sometimes used as a title of address for Buddhist monks who have passed ten vassas. In Thai, the term is ajahn.

In Vajrayana Buddhism, tantric masters are known as vajrācāryas (Tibetan: dorje lopön; Chinese: 金剛阿闍梨, pinyin: jīngāng āshélí, romanji. kongō ajari). In Chinese Buddhism, this term is also sometimes alternatively translated as jingang shangshi (Chinese: 金剛上師; pinyin: Jīngāng Shàngshī, lit: "Vajra Superior Master") in the context of certain rituals.

== In Jainism ==
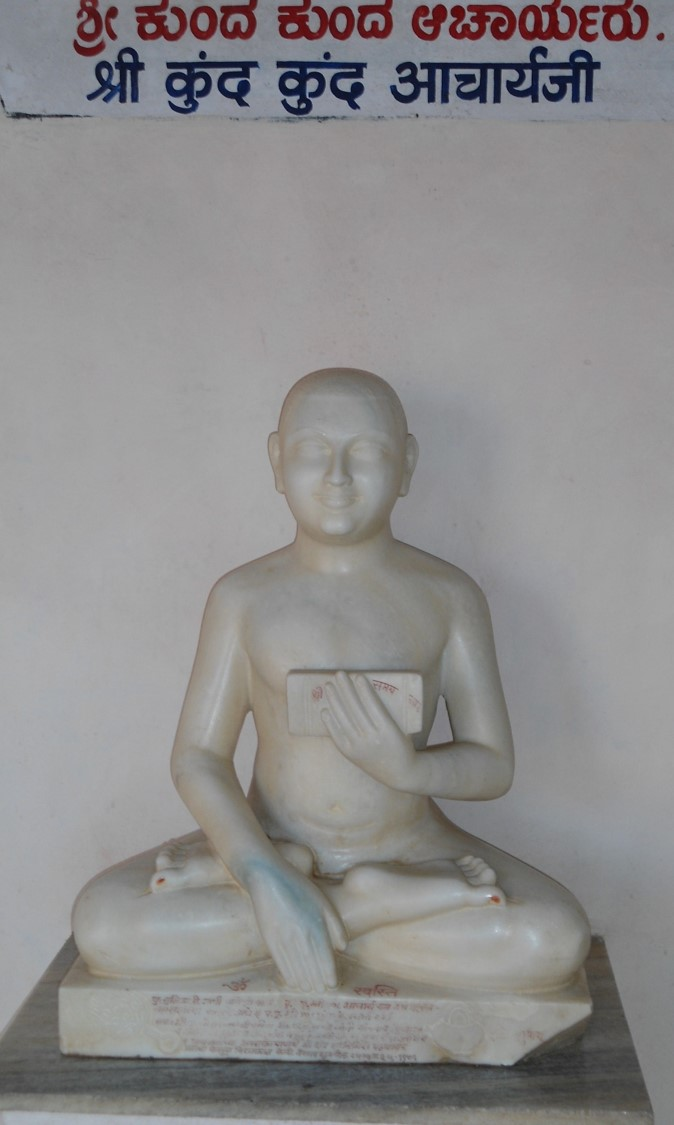
Image of Āchārya Kundakunda, author of Jain texts like Pancastikayasara, Niyamasara

In Jainism, an acharya is the highest leader of a Jain order. Acharya is one of the Pañca-Parameṣṭhi (five supreme beings) and thus worthy of worship. They are the final authority in the monastic order and have the authority to ordain new monks and nuns. They also have the authority to consecrate new idols, though they occasionally appoint scholars to carry out this duty.

An acharya, like any other Jain monk, is expected to wander except for the Chaturmas. Bhaṭṭārakas, who head institutions, are technically junior monks, and thus permitted to stay in the same place.

== In scientific/mathematical scholarship ==
- Bhaskaracharya
- Mahaviracharya
- Bhaskaracharya I

== Academic degree ==
In Sanskrit institutions, acharya is a post-graduate degree equivalent to Master of Arts in the Anglophone world. The equivalent of a PhD is vidyāvāridhi.
