= Niyamasara =

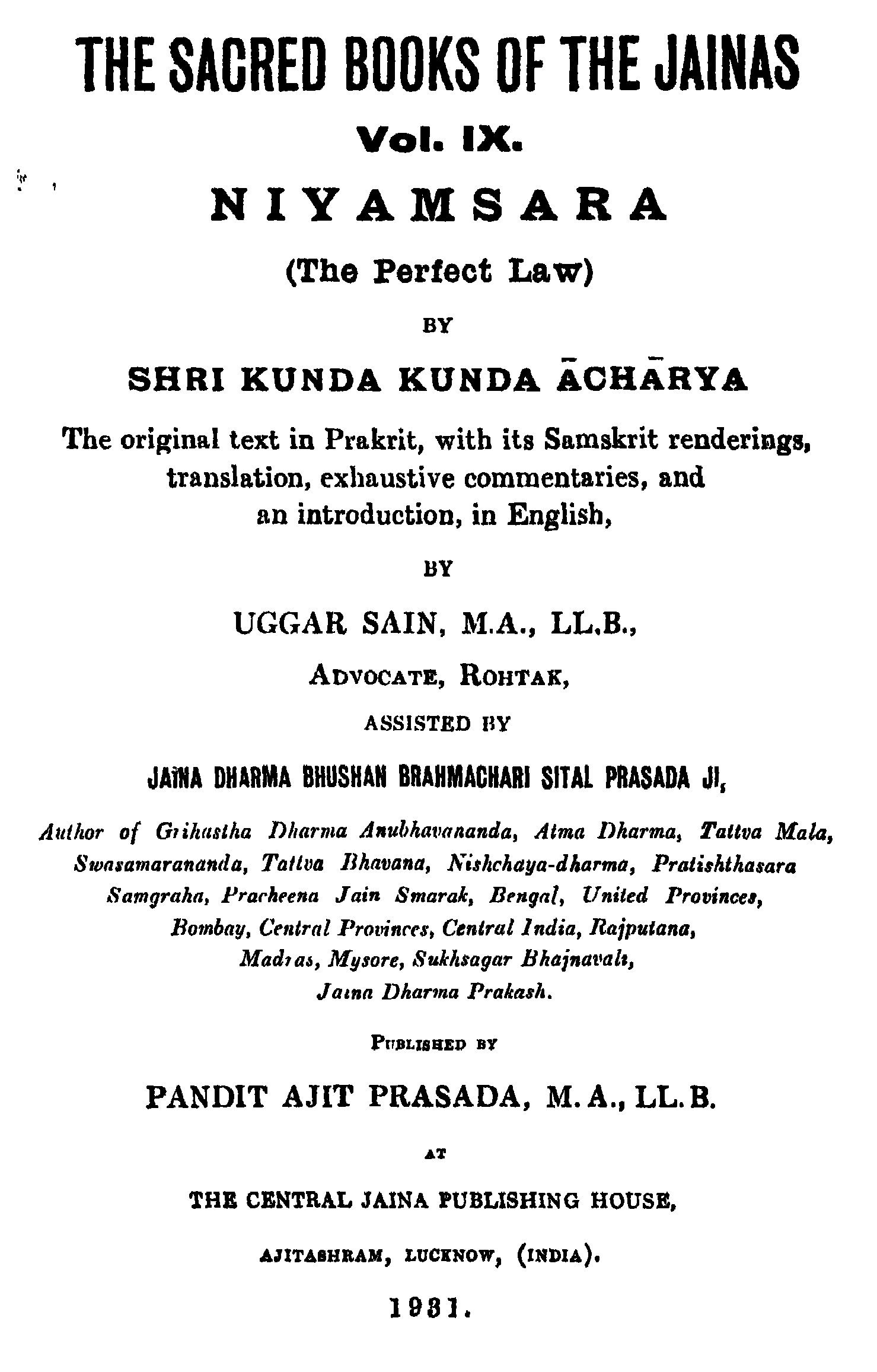
- English translation of Niyamasara

Information
- Religion: Jainism
- Author: Kundakunda
- Language: Prakrit
- Period: 1st century B.C.
- Verses: 187

Niyamasāra is a Jain text authored by Acharya Kundakunda, a Digambara Jain acharya. It is described by its commentators as the Bhagavat Shastra. It expounds the path to liberation.

A modern English translation was published by Vijay K. Jain in 2019.

== Subject matter ==
Niyamasara deals with the three ethico-spiritual standpoints of understanding ultimate Reality – the Nishcaya naya, the Vyavahara naya and the Shuddha naya.

Niyamasara effectively removes doubts related to Parayayarthika naya and Dravyarthika nayas and elaborates on Vyavahara caritra. He stresses that Vyavahara caritra is based on samyama (self-restraint) and hence rooted in appropriate psychic disposition. He places great emphasis on cleansing the soul of vibhavas, internal impurities, through self-discipline.

A unique feature of the Niyamasara is that Kundakunda characterises both Nichcaya caritra and Vyavahara caritra as tapa, or practice of austerity from their respective nayas. This characterization is based on psychological and pragmatic considerations and if put in practice properly it would lead to internal and external purity and annihilation of the four passions. Kundakunda concludes that Vyavahara caritra and Nishcaya caritra together constitute Samyak caritra. Another unique feature of this text is its description of parama samadhi, not found elsewhere in Jain literature.
