= Kathara =

Kathāra is a village panchayat located in the Darbhanga district, Bihar state, India.
