= Pancastikayasara =

- Pancastikayasara

Information
- Religion: Jainism
- Author: Kundakunda
- Period: 1st century B.C.
- Verses: 180

Pañcāstikāyasāra ("The Essence of Reality") is an ancient Jain text authored by Acharya Kundakunda. Kundakunda explains the Jain concepts of dravya (substance) and Ethics. The work serves as a brief version of the Jaina philosophy. There are total 180 verses written in Prakrit language. The text is about five (panch) āstikāya, substances that have real existence and have substance, namely Jīva (soul), Pudgala (matter), Dharma (medium of motion), Adharma (medium of rest), and Akasa (space).

A modern English translation was published by Vijay K. Jain in 2018.

== Sources ==
- Kundakunda, Acharya; Chakravarti, Appaswami; Upādhye, Ādinātha Neminātha (2001), Ācārya Kundakunda's Pañcāstikāya-sāra, Bharatiya Jnanpith, p. 16, ISBN 978-81-263-1813-1
- Jaini, Padmanabh S. (1991), Gender and Salvation: Jaina Debates on the Spiritual Liberation of Women, University of California Press, ISBN 0-520-06820-3
- Jain, Vijay K. (2020). Ācārya Kundakunda's Pańcāstikāya-saṃgraha – With Authentic Explanatory Notes in English (The Jaina Metaphysics). Dehradun: Vikalp Printers. ISBN 978-81-932726-5-7.
