= Samayasāra =

Jain religious text

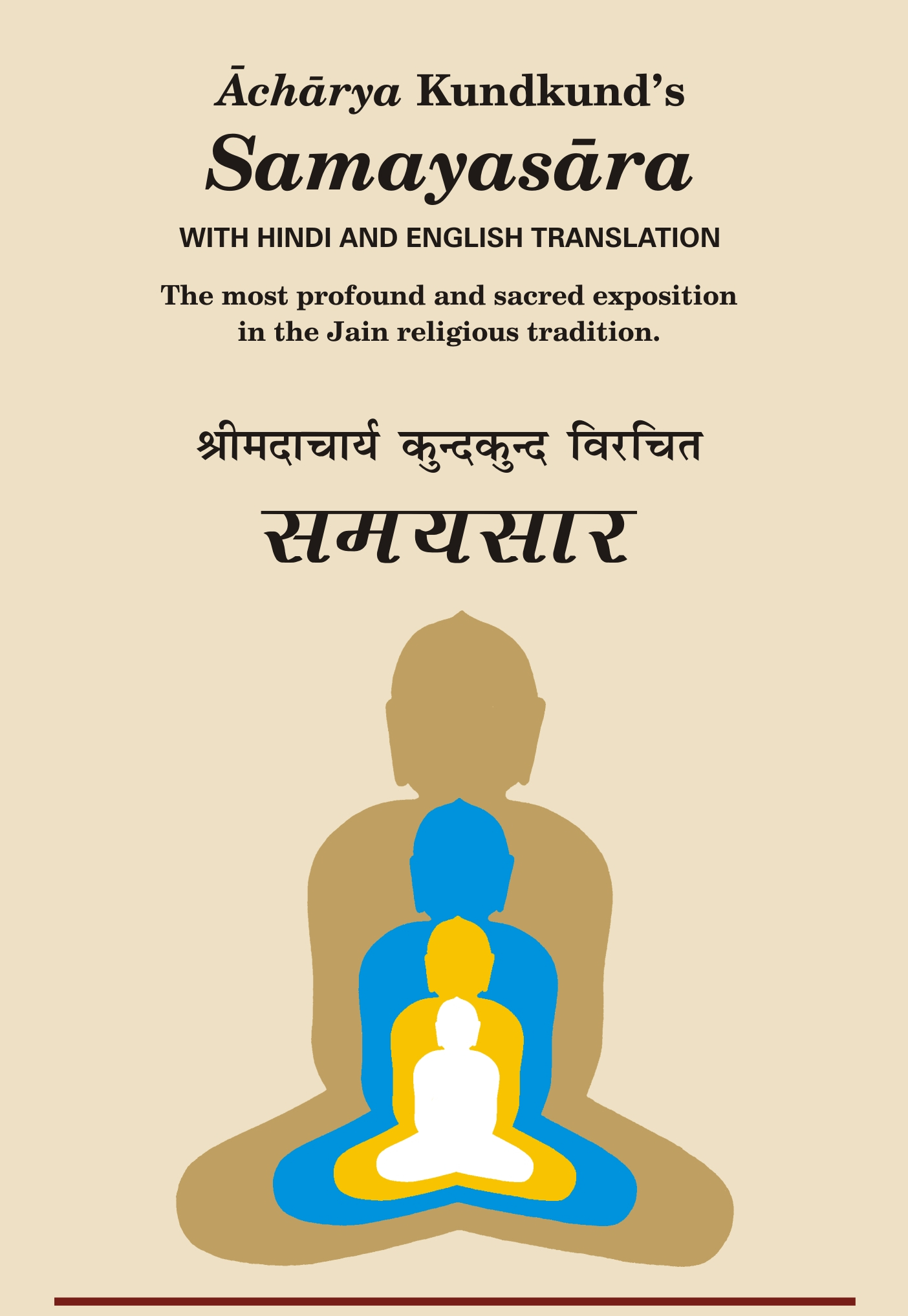

Information
- Religion: Jainism
- Author: Kundakunda
- Language: Prakrit
- Period: (1st BCE–2nd century CE)
- Verses: 439

Samayasāra (The Nature of the Self) is a famous Jain text composed by Kundakunda an early Digambar Jain Monk, (1st BCE–2nd century CE) in 439 verses. Its ten chapters discuss the nature of Jīva (pure self/soul), its attachment to Karma and Moksha (liberation). Samayasāra expounds the Jain concepts like Karma, Asrava (influx of karmas), Bandha (Bondage), Samvara (stoppage), Nirjara (shedding) and Moksha (complete annihilation of karmas).

A modern English translation was published by Vijay K. Jain in 2022.

== History ==
Samayasara was written by Acharya Kundakunda in Prakrit. The text marked a pivotal development in Jain philosophical history by systematically establishing the ultimate (niścaya) and conventional (vyavahāra) standpoints to articulate the pure nature of the soul.

== Contents ==
The original Samayasara of Kundakunda consists of 415 verses and was written in Prakrit. The first verse (aphorism) of the Samayasāra is an invocation:

O bhavyas (potential aspirants to liberation)! Making obeisance to all the Siddhas, established in the fifth state of existence that is eternal, immutable, and incomparable (perfection par excellence), I will articulate this Samayaprābhrita, which has been propounded by the all-knowing Masters of Scripture.

According to Samayasāra, the real self is only that soul which has achieved ratnatraya i.e. Samyak Darshan, Samyak Gyan and Samyak Charitra. These state when soul achieves purity is Arihant and Siddha. It can be achieved by victory over five senses. According to Samayasāra:

The Self, by his own enterprise, protecting himself from virtuous as well as wicked activities that cause merit and demerit, and stationing himself in right faith and knowledge, detached from body and desires etc., devoid of external and internal attachments, contemplates on the Self, through his own Self, and does not reflect upon the karmas and the quasi-karmic matter (nokarma); the Self with such distinctive qualities experiences oneness with the Self. Such a Self, contemplating on the Self, becomes of the nature of right faith and knowledge, and being immersed in the Self, attains, in a short span of time, status of the Pure Self that is free from all karmas.

— Samayasāra (187-189)

== Commentaries ==
It has a number of commentaries on it. Atmakhyati or Samayasara Kalasha, written by Acharya Amritchandra in 12th century CE, is a 278-verse Sanskrit commentary. Samaysar Kalash Tika or Balbodh was written by Pande Rajmall or Raymall in 16th century CE. It is a commentary of Amritchandra's Samaysar Kalasha. Nataka Samayasara is a commentary on Rajmall's version which was written by Banarasidas in Braj Bhasha in 17th century CE.

== See also ==
- Sarvārthasiddhi
- Moksha (Jainism)
