= Kundakunda =

Indian Jain monk

Acharya Kundakunda
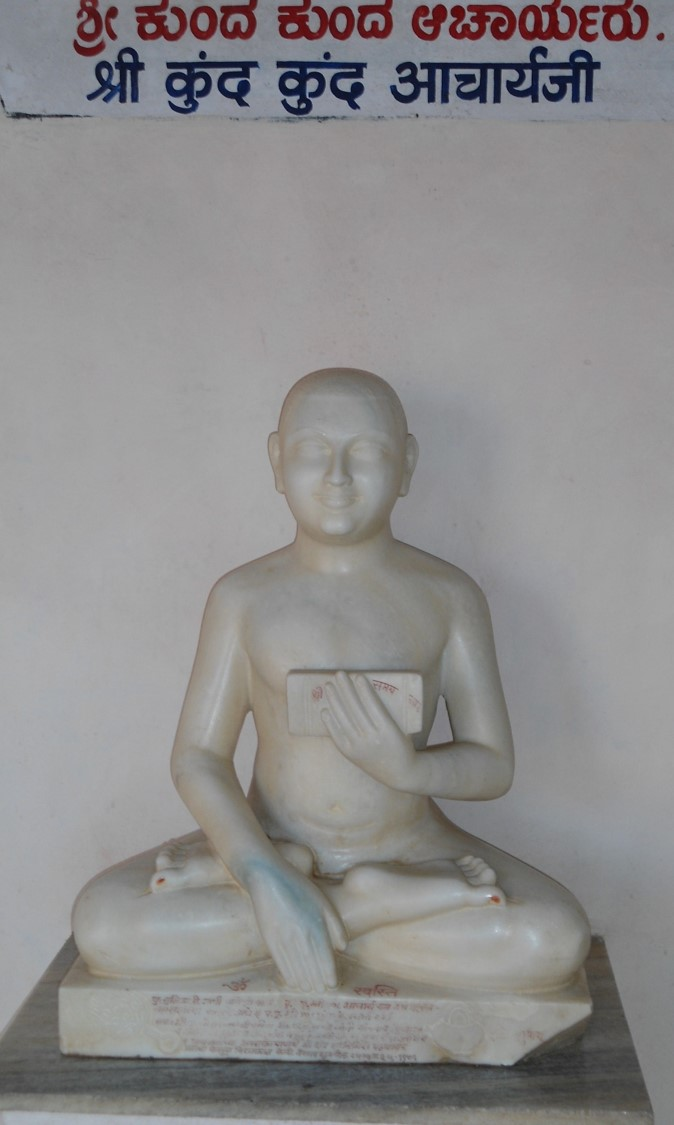
- Idol of Kundakunda, Karnataka

Personal life
- Born: scholarly dating 8th century CE, or multiple authorship with layers dating from 350–400 up to 950–1150 CE; trad. Jain-dating 2nd–3rd century CE

Religious life
- Religion: Jainism
- Sect: Digambara

Kundakunda is the name given to the author or authors of sixteen influential Digambara texts, including Niyamasāra ("The Essence of the Restraint"), Pañcāstikāyasāra ("The Essence of the Five Existents"), Samayasāra ("The Essence of the Self"), and Pravacanasāra ("The Essence of the Teaching"). These attributions are questioned, and "only parts of some works are likely to have been written by him," showing "clear signs of interpolations" and multiple authorship.

While dates for "Kundakunda" range from scholarly datings in the 8th c. CE to traditional datings in the 2nd–3rd c. CE, texts attributed to him may reflect multiple authorship, containing layers dating from 350–400 (Pañcâstikāya-sangraha) and 550–600 CE (Samaya-sāra) up to 950–1150 CE. The Kundakunda-core texts were anonymous compilations for several centuries, and it is not until Jayasena's (ca. 1150–1200) commentary on the Pañcâstikāya that an author is explicitly mentioned and a Kundakunda-narrative is created.

The Kundakunda-attributed works show influences from Samkhya, Mahayana Buddhism, and especially Advaita Vedanta, reflected in the distinction between niścayanaya or ‘ultimate perspective’ and vyavahāranaya or ‘mundane perspective’, or the pure atman and the material world. (Note: The recognition of this distinction is called bhed-jnan, bhedvijnan, bheda-vijnana, bhedvigyan, or bhedgnan.)

With the Kundakunda-texts the Digambara developed a mystical tradition focusing on the direct realization of the ultimate perspective of the pure soul, and Kundakunda's emphasis on liberating knowledge has become a mainstream view in Digambara Jainism. Kundakunda was an important inspiration for Shrimad Rajchandra (1867–1901), who in turn inspired Kanji Swami (1890–1980), Rakesh Jhaveri and the Shrimad Rajchandra Mission, and Dada Bhagwan (1908–1988).

== Authorship, names, and dating ==
While Jain-tradition regards Kundakunda as an author from the 2nd or 3rd century who wrote numerous works, academic scholarship has questioned these datings and attributions, proposing later dates and also proposing multiple authorship.

Balcerowicz discerns seven strata for the Pañcâstikāya-sangraha, starting in 350–400 CE and ending in 950–1150. The Samaya-sāra contains four layers, from 550–600 CE to 950–1150 CE. According to Balcerowicz

we should rather speak of a ‘collective author’ or ‘collective thinker’ known as ‘Kundakunda’. We may, of course apply the conventional authorship of ‘Kundakunda’ to a nucleus of writings that bears certain features that allow us to attribute them to a particular philosophical Digambara tradition of the period between the sixth and early tenth centuries, albeit there is no particular historical person named ‘Kundakunda’ identifible as their author: the historical person Kundakunda may have been an author of one of the historical layers, but we may not even know of which of them.

Likewise, Johnson states that

...it is more fruitful to view these works as heterogeneous repositories of accumulated Digambara teaching, including relatively new as well as traditional material, rather than the imperfectly preserved work of an individual heterodox philosopher.

Johannes Bronkhorst disagrees with Johnson, stating "I do have the impression of being confronted with the work of someone who wished to incorporate into Jainism a notion that had become very useful and fruitful in other currents, primarily Samkhya, but also elsewhere."

According to Dundas, following Dhaky (1991), Kundakunda can be dated to the 8th century CE, as his hagiography, and quotations from his influential and important work begin to appear around 8th-century CE, and his ideas can also be traced to this time-period. (Note: Dundas (2002, pp. 291 note 52): "Dhaky (1991). This proposed redating would entail Kundakunda being located close to early Advaita Vedånta which his teachings resemble in certain respects.) Jain scholars date him much earlier, with Natubhai Shah and A.N. Upadhye placing him in the second-century CE, and Jayandra Soni placing him in either the 2nd– or 3rd–century CE.

Balcerowicz notes that the Kundakunda-core texts were anonymous compilations for several centuries. It is not until Jayasena's (ca. 1150–1200) commentary on the Pañcâstikāya that an author is explicitly mentioned. According to Balcerowicz, Jayasena had an important role in the creation of the Kundakunda-narrative, narrating a story about Kundakunda "the true essence of the Pure Soul (śuddhâtmatattva)"by means of an encounter in "the distant continent of Eastern Videha" with "the omniscient Tīrthakara Sīmandara-svāmin," whereafeter he returns and recites the Pañcâstikāya-prābhrta to the Mahārāja Śivakumāra. The story seems to be modelled on Hindu motifs, and was popularized in modern times by Kanji Swami (1890–1980) who claimed to have been present at this occasion in a previous life, after his follower Campāben (1918–1993), who said she had been there too in a previous life.

Kundakunda is known under various names, including Padmanandin. The name Kundakunda is derived from the modern village of Konakondla in Anantapur district of Andhra Pradesh to which Padmanandin is related. He is also presumed to be the one being alluded to by names such as Elacarya, Vakragriva, Grdhrapiccha or Mahamati. According to Jayandra Soni these names are likely incorrect, because they have been used for other Jain scholars such as Umaswati in texts and others in inscriptions. Balcerowicz states that the accounts on which these names are based are unreliable, but suggests "that these names perhaps preserve five different authors of various historical layers that were incorporated into the core works ascribed later to one of them, Kundakunda."

== Thought and influences ==
According to Balcerowicz,

it is virtually impossible to expect a homogenous 'philosophy of Kundakunda', inasmuch as various historical strands incorporated into the three core works reflect quite different, often incompatible philosophical ideas. There is nothing resembling a unifid philosophical system represented in Kundakunda’s works, which as such cannot be treated as original and premier formulations of certain ideas. On the contrary, they are mostly compilatory and secondary in character, and only some of these ideas gained prominence since mediaeval times. Mostly, we fid both standard and non-standard depictions of Jaina ontology and epistemology, with no attempt to reconcile such divergencies.

Balcerowicz further notes that "a most decisive impact came from early (and even later) Advaita-Vedānta, primarily the ideas traceable to such works as Gaudapāda’s Verses (Gaudapāda-kārikā; c. 500 CE), Ādiśesa’s Quintessence of the Ultimate Reality (Paramârtha-sāra; early sixth century)." These works contributed the idea of a dichotomy between a pure, free self (atman) and the material world, correlated with niścayanaya or ‘ultimate perspective’, and vyavahāranaya or ‘mundane perspective’.

According to Long, Kundakunda was influenced by Buddhist philosophy, and developed a Jain version of the two truths doctrine. In texts such as Pravacanasāra (‘The Essence of the Doctrine’) and Samayasāra (‘The Essence of the Soul’), Kundakunda distinguishes between two perspectives of truth:

- niścayanaya or ‘ultimate perspective’, also called “supreme” (paramārtha) and “pure” (śuddha)
- vyavahāranaya or ‘mundane perspective’, also delusion (moha)

For Kundakunda, the mundane realm of truth is also the relative perspective of normal folk, where the workings of karma operate and where things emerge, last for a certain duration and perish. The mundane aspect is associated with the changing qualities of the soul mainly the influx of karmic particles. The ultimate perspective meanwhile, is that of the pure soul or atman, the jiva, which is "blissful, energetic, perceptive, and omniscient". Delusion and bondage manifest when vyavahāranaya dominates and the true nature of the soul, which is always pure, is forgotten, in contrast to niścayanaya and Kevala Jnana, the perspective of a Jina. Knowledge of this distinction is also called bhed-jnan, bhedvijnan, bheda-vijnana, bhedvigyan, and bhedgnan.

According to Long, this view shows influence from Buddhism and Vedanta, which see bondage are arising from avidya, ignorance, and see the ultimate solution to this in a form of spiritual gnosis. Johnson also notes that "his use of a vyavahara/niscaya distinction [...] has more in common with Madhyamaka Buddhism and even more with Advaita Vedanta than with the Jain philosophy of Anekantavada." Bronkhorst sees here primarily influences of Samkhya, which were integrated by one author into a coherent Jain-system.

His emphasis on the self as pure knowledge led him to deemphasize ascetic practice and focus "upon spiritual exercises that lead to salvific insight and self-realization." Kundakunda uses a duality between self and other which was also used by Haribhadra, in which "the other" is not only material karma, but also the material aggregate of body and mind (namarupa) in which the soul is bound. Cort, referring to Johnson, notes that "a minority position exemplified by Kundakunda has deemphasized conduct and focused upon knowledge alone."

== Works ==
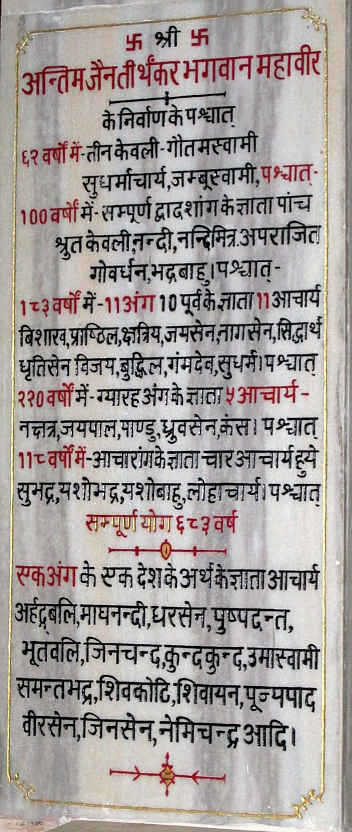
The Digambara Shruta tradition

Sixteen works are attributed to Kundakunda, but this attribution is questioned, and "only parts of some works are likely to have been written by him," and several texts "evince clear signs of interpolations."

The works attributed to Kundakunda, all of them in Prakrit, can be divided in three groups.

The first group comprises four original works described as "The Essence" (sara)—namely, the Niyamasāra (The Essence of the Restraint, in 187 verses), the Pañcāstikāyasāra (The Essence of the Five Existents, in 153 verses), the Samayasāra (The Essence of the Self, in 439 verses), and the Pravacanasāra (The Essence of the Teaching, in 275 verses).

The second group is a collection of ten bhaktis (devotional prayers), short compositions in praise of the acharya (Acharyabhakti), the scriptures (Srutabhakti), the mendicant conduct (Charitrabhakti), and so forth. They form the standard liturgical texts used by the Digambaras in their daily rituals and bear close resemblance to similar, more ancient texts written by the Śvētāmbaras, suggesting the possibility of adoption of some ideas of devotional prayers from the Śvētāmbara canon.

The last group consists of eight short texts called Astapahuda or Prabhrta (Pkt. pahuda, i.e., a gift or a treatise), probably compilations from some older sources, on such topics as the right view (Darsanaprabhrta, in 36 verses), right conduct (Charitraprabhrta, in 44 verses), the scripture (Sutraprabhrta, in 27 verses), and so forth. The Astapahuda are "shown by Schubring to be later than Kundakunda on metrical and stylistic grounds."

== Influence ==
=== Digambara mysticism ===
According to Long, with Kundakunda "a distinctively Digambara bent towards mysticism emerges [...] a focus in religiois practice upon cultivating direct experience or realization of the ultimate reality [...] the pure nature of the liberated soul, or jiva." While Kundakunda's emphasis on liberating knowledge is a somewhat heterodox view in light of Jainism's orthodox 'karmic realism', which sees karma as real physical particles which become attached to the soul, it has become a mainstream view in Digambara Jainism. In the Digambara tradition, Kundakunda's texts are among the most important and treasured. The reverence for his scholarship is such that some later texts such as Pravachanasara list him third in importance, right after Mahavira and Mahavira's disciple Indrabhuti Gautama.

=== Kundakunda-inspired lay-movements ===
The Kundakunda-corpus inspired two contemporary lay-movements within Jainism with the Mahayana Buddhism and Advaita Vedanta inspired notion of two truths and his emphasis on direct insight into niścayanaya or ‘ultimate perspective’, also called “supreme” (paramārtha) and “pure” (śuddha). (Note: According to Long, this view shows influence from Buddhism and Vedanta, which see bondage are arising from avidya, ignorance, and see the ultimate solution to this in a form of spiritual gnosis. Johnson also notes that "his use of a vyavahara/niscaya distinction [...] has more in common with Madhyamaka Buddhism and even more with Advaita Vedanta than with the Jain philosophy of Anekantavada." Cort, referring to Johnson, notes that "a minority position exemplified by Kundakunda has deemphasized conduct and focused upon knowledge alone.")

Shrimad Rajchandra (1867–1901) was a Jain poet and mystic who was inspired by works of Kundakunda and Digambara mystical tradition. Nominally belonging to the Digambara tradition, his followers sometimes consider his teaching as a new path of Jainism, neither Śvetāmbara nor Digambara, and revere him as a saint. His path is sometimes referred as Raj Bhakta Marg, Kavipanth, or Shrimadiya, which has mostly lay followers as was Rajchandra himself. His teachings influenced Kanji Swami, Dada Bhagwan, Rakesh Jhaveri (Shrimad Rajchandra Mission), Saubhagbhai, Lalluji Maharaj (Laghuraj Swami), Atmanandji and several other religious figures.

Kanji Panth is a lay movement founded by Kanji Swami (1890–1980). Nominally it belongs to the Śvetāmbara but is inspired by Kundakunda and Shrimad Rajchandra (1867–1901), though "lacking a place in any Digambara ascetic lineage descending from Kundakunda." Kanji Swami has many followers in the Jain diaspora. They generally regard themselves simply as Digambara Jains, more popularly known as Mumukshu, following the mystical tradition of Kundakunda and Pandit Todarmal.

Bauer notes that "[in] recent years there has been a convergence of the Kanji Swami Panth and the Shrimad Rajcandra movement, part of trend toward a more eucumenical and less sectarian Jainism among educated, mobile Jains living overseas."

The Akram Vignan Movement established by Dada Bhagwan draws inspiration from teachings of Rajchandra and other Jain scriptures, though it is considered as a Jain-Vaishnava Hindu syncretistic movement.

== Publications and translations ==
- Niyamasāra, ed. and trans. U. Sain, Lucknow, 1931.
- Pravacanasāra with Amṛtacandra’s commentary, ed. A. N. Upadhye, Bombay, 1935.
- Samayasāra, text, trans. and comm. by A. Chakravarti, Banaras, 1930.
- Jain, Vijay K. (2021). Ācārya Kundakunda’s Bārasa Aṇuvekkhā – The Twelve Contemplations आचार्य कुन्दकुन्द विरचित बारस अणुवेक्खा (द्वादश अनुप्रेक्षा, बारह भावना). Dehradun: Vikalp Printers. ISBN 978-93-5566-134-0.
- Jain, Vijay K. (2019). Ācārya Kundakunda’s Niyamasāra – The Essence of Soul-adoration आचार्य कुन्दकुन्द विरचित "नियमसार". Dehradun: Vikalp Printers. ISBN 978-81-932726-3-3.
- Jain, Vijay K. (2020). Ācārya Kundakunda’s Pańcāstikāya-saṃgraha – With Authentic Explanatory Notes in English (The Jaina Metaphysics). Dehradun: Vikalp Printers. ISBN 978-81-932726-5-7.
- Jain, Vijay K. (2018). Ācārya Kundakunda’s Pravacanasāra – Essence of the Doctrine. Dehradun: Vikalp Printers. ISBN 978-81-932726-1-9.
- Jain, Vijay K. (2023). Ācārya Kundakunda’s Rayaṇasāra आचार्य कुन्दकुन्द विरचित रयणसार. Dehradun: Vikalp Printers. ISBN 978-93-5980-180-3.
- Jain, Vijay K. (2022). Ācārya Kundakunda’s Samayasāra – with Hindi and English Translation आचार्य कुन्दकुन्द विरचित समयसार. Dehradun: Vikalp Printers. ISBN 978-93-5680-382-4.
- Jain, Vijay K. (2012). Âchârya Kundkund’s Samayasāra श्रीमदाचार्य कुन्दकुन्द विरचित समयसार. Dehradun: Vikalp Printers. ISBN 81-903639-3-X. OCLC 811822895.

== See also ==
- Simandhar Swami
- Devardhigani Kshamashraman
- Hemachandra
- Hiravijaya

== Sources ==
- Balcerowicz, Piotr (2023). "Kundakunda, A 'Collective Author': Deconstruction of a Myth". In Flugel, Peter; De Jonckheere, Heleen; Sohnen-Tieme, Renate (eds.). Pure Soul: The Jaina Spiritual Traditions. Centre of Jain Studies, SOAS.
- Bauer, Jerome (2004). "Kanji Swami (1890–1980)". In Jestice, Phyllis G. (ed.). Holy People of the World: A Cross-Cultural Encyclopedia. Vol. 1. ABC-CLIO. p. 464. ISBN 9781576073551.
- Bronkhorst, Johannes (2015). "Kundakunda versus Samkhya on the Soul". In Key Chapple, Christopher (ed.). Yoga in Jainism. Routledge.
- Cort, John E. (1998), Open Boundaries: Jain Communities and Cultures in Indian History, SUNY Press, ISBN 0-7914-3785-X
- Dundas, Paul (2002). The Jains. Routledge. ISBN 978-0-415-26606-2.
- Flügel, Peter (2005). "Present Lord: Simandhara Svami and the Akram Vijnan Movement" (PDF). In King, Anna S.; Brockington, John (eds.). The Intimate Other: Love Divine in the Indic Religions. New Delhi: Orient Longman. pp. 194–243. ISBN 9788125028017.
- Jaini, Padmanabh (1991), Gender and Salvation: Jaina Debates on the Spiritual Liberation of Women, Berkeley: University of California Press
- Jain, Prakash C. (2025). Jains in India and Abroad: A Sociological Introduction. DK Printworld.
- Jayandra Soni (2003) [2002], Balcerowicz, Piotr (ed.), Essays in Jaina Philosophy and Religion, Motilal Banarsidass, ISBN 81-208-1977-2
- Johnson, W.J. (1995), Harmless Souls: Karmic Bondage and Religious Change in Early Jainism with Special Reference to Umāsvāti and Kundakunda, Motilal Banarsidass, ISBN 978-81-208-1309-0
- Long, Jeffery D. (2013). Jainism: An Introduction. I.B.Tauris. ISBN 978-0-85771-392-6.
- "Kundakunda". The Concise Oxford Dictionary of World Religions.
- Parson, Rahul Bjorn (2019). "Individualisation and democratisation of knowledge in Banarsidas' Samayasara Nataka". In Fuchs, Martin (ed.). Religious Individualisation: Historical Dimensions and Comparative Perspectives. Walter de Gruyter GmbH & Co KG.
- Salter, Emma (2002). Raj Bhakta Marg: the path of devotion to Srimad Rajcandra. A Jain community in the twenty first century (Doctoral thesis). University of Wales. pp. 98–108, 247, 251 – via University of Huddersfield Repository.
- Shah, Natubhai (2004) [1998], Jainism: The World of Conquerors, vol. I, Motilal Banarsidass, ISBN 81-208-1938-1
- Shaw, Richard. "Kanji swami Panth". University of Cumbria. Division of Religion and philosophy.
- Singh, Upinder (2008), A history of ancient and early medieval India : from the Stone Age to the 12th century, New Delhi: Pearson Education, ISBN 978-81-317-1120-0
- Winternitz, Maurice (1972). A History of Indian Literature Vol. II. Buddhist Literature and Jaina Literature (2nd ed.). University of Calcutta.
