= List of Jain texts =

This is a list of Jain literature. The list include the names of texts which form the Jain philosophy and talks about Jainism in general.

== Digambara texts ==
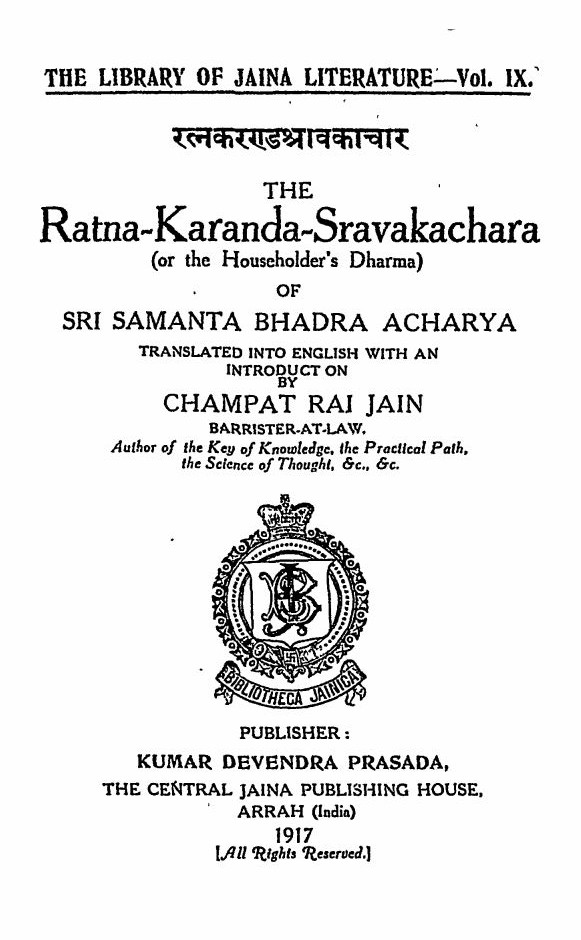
The Ratna Karanda Sravakachara

1. Shatkhandagama — Acharya Pushpadant, Acharya Bhutabali
2. Samaysar — Acharya Kundkund
3. Niyamasara — Acharya Kundkund
4. Pravachansara — Acharya Kundkund
5. Ashtapahud — Acharya Kundkund
6. Panchastikaya — Acharya Kundkund
7. Rayansara — Acharya Kundkund
8. Dash Bhakti — Acharya Kundkund
9. Varsanuvekkha — Acharya Kundkund
10. Tattvartha Sutra — Acharya Umaswami
11. Aptamimansa — Acharya Samantabhadra
12. Swayambhu Stotra — Acharya Samantabhadra
13. Ratnakaranda Sravakachar — Acharya Samantabhadra
14. Stuti Vidya — Acharya Samantabhadra
15. Yuktyanushasana — Acharya Samantabhadra
16. Tattvasara — Acharya Devsena
17. Aradhana Saar — Acharya Devsen
18. Aalap Paddhati — Acharya Devsen
19. Darshansara — Acharya Devsena
20. Bhavasangrah — Acharya Devsen
21. Laghu Nayachakra — Acharya Devsen
22. Ishtopadesh — Acharya Pujyapad (Devanandi)
23. Samadhi Tantra — Acharya Pujyapada (Devanandi)
24. Sarvarthasiddhi — Acharya Pujyapad (Devanandi)
25. Vaidyaka Shastra — Acharya Pujyapada (Devanandi)
26. Siddhipriya Stotra — Acharya Pujyapad (Devanandi)
27. Jainendra Vyakaran — Acharya Pujyapada (Devanandi)
28. Paramatma Prakash — Acharya Yogindu Dev
29. Yogasara — Acharya Yogindu Dev
30. Naukar Shravakacharya — Acharya Yogindu Dev
31. Tattvartha Tika — Acharya Yogindu Dev
32. Amritashiti — Acharya Yogindu Dev
33. Subhashit Tantra — Acharya Yogindu Dev
34. Adhyatma Sandoha — Acharya Yogindu Dev
35. Sanmati Sutra — Acharya Siddhasena Divakar
36. Kalyan Mandir — Acharya Siddhasen Diwakar
37. Ashtashati — Acharya Akalankadeva
38. Laghiyastraya — Acharya Akalankadeva
39. Nyayavinischaya Savrtti — Acharya Akalankadeva
40. Siddhivinischaya Savrtti — Acharya Akalankadeva
41. Praman Sangrah Savritti — Acharya Akalankdev
42. Tattvartha Rajavartika — Acharya Akalankadeva
43. Harivansh Purana — Acharya Jinsen (first)
44. Adi Purana — Acharya Jinsen
45. Uttarpuran — Acharya Gunbhadra
46. Aatmanushasan — Acharya Gunbhadra
47. Ashtasahastri — Acharya Vidyananda
48. Sloka Vartika — Acharya Vidyananda
49. Aaptpareeksha — Acharya Vidyananda
50. Pramanpareeksha — Acharya Vidyananda
51. Patra Pareeksha — Acharya Vidyanand
52. Kshatriyachudamani — Acharya Vadibhasingh Suri
53. Gadyachintamani — Acharya Vadibhasingh Suri
54. Kartikeya Anupreksha — Acharya Kartikeya Swami
55. Tattvarthasara — Acharya Amritchand
56. PurusharthasiddhiUpaya — Acharya Amritchandra
57. Atmakhyati Tika — Acharya Amritchandra
58. Laghutatvasphot — Acharya Amritchandra
59. Tattvapradipika Tika — Acharya Amritchandra
60. Varang Charitra — Shri Jata Singh Nandi
61. Chandraprabha Charitra — Acharya Veeranandi
62. Kashay Pahud — Acharya Gundhar
63. Gommatasara — Acharya Nemichandra Siddhanta Chakravarti
64. Pashanahchariu — Sage Padmakirti
65. Triloksara — Acharya Nemichandran Siddhant Chakraborty
66. Labdhisar — Acharya Nemichandran Siddhant Chakraborty
67. Kshapanasar — Acharya Nemichandran Siddhant Chakraborty
68. Tiloyapannatti — Acharya Yativrishabha
69. Jambudvipa Pannatti — Acharya Yativrishabha
70. Dhawala Tika — Acharya Veersen
71. Yashstilak Champu — Acharya Somdev
72. Nitivakyamrit — Acharya Somdev
73. Adhyatmatarangini — Acharya Somdev
74. Siddhivinischaya Tika — Brihad Anantavirya
75. Pramanasamgrahabhashya — Brihad Anantavirya
76. Shaktayana Shabdanushasana — Acharya Shaktayana
77. Kevali Bhukti — Acharya Shaktayana
78. Laghu Dravya Sangrah — Acharya Nemichand
79. Vihad Dravya Sangrah — Acharya Nemichandra
80. Prameya-Kamal-Martand — Acharya Prabhachandra
81. Nyay Kumudchandra — Acharya Prabhachandra
82. Tattvartha-vrittipada-vivaranam — Acharya Prabhachandra
83. Shaktayan-Nyas — Acharya Prabhachandra
84. Shabdambhoj Bhaskar — Acharya Prabhachandra
85. Gadyakathakosh — Acharya Prabhachandra
86. Pradyumnacharitra — Acharya Mahasena
87. Bhaktamar Strotra — Acharya Mantung
88. Padmanandi Panchavinshatika — Acharya Padmanandi (II)
89. Mulachara — Swami of Acharya Vattaker
90. Gyanarnav — Shubhachandracharya ji
91. Bhagavati Aradhana — Acharya Shivarya (Shivkoti)
92. Amitgati Sravakacharya — Acharya Amitgati
93. Dharma Pariksha — Acharya Amitgati
94. Subhashit Ratna Sandoh — Acharya Amitgati
95. Tattva Bhavana — Acharya Amitgati
96. Panch Sangrah — Acharya Amitgati
97. Bhavana Dvatrinshatika — Acharya Amitgati
98. Niyamasara Tika — Acharya Padmaprabhamaladharideva
99. Parsvnath Stotra — Acharya Padmaprabhamaladharideva
100. Dharmaamrita — Acharya Nayasena
101. Samayasaratatparyavrttitika — Acharya Jayasena (II)
102. Niyamasaratatparyavrttitika — Acharya Jayasena (II)
103. Panchastikayatatparyavrttitika — Acharya Jayasena (II)
104. Tattvanushasana — Acharya Ramsen
105. Prameyaratnamala — Acharya Laghu Anantavirya
106. Siddhantsaar — Acharya Narendrasen
107. Parīkşāmukha — Acharya Māņikyanandi
108. Nyayadipika — Acharya Dharmabhushan Yeti
109. Dravya Prakash Nayachakra — Acharya Mayil Dhawal
110. Padma Purana — Acharya Ravishena
111. Mulachara — Swami Acharya Vattaker
112. Ganitasar Sangrah — Acharya Mahavir
113. Shripal Charitra — Acharya Sakalkirti
114. Shantinath Charitra — Acharya Sakalkirti
115. Vardhaman Charitra — Acharya Sakalkirti
116. Mallinath Charitra — Acharya Sakalkirti
117. Yashodhar Charitra — Acharya Sakalkirti
118. Dhanyakumar Charitra — Acharya Sakalkirti
119. Sukmal Charitra — Acharya Sakalkirti
120. Sudarshan Charitra — Acharya Sakalkirti
121. Jambuswamy Charitra — Acharya Sakalkirti
122. Mulachar Pradeep — Acharya Sakalkirti
123. Parsvnath Purana — Acharya Sakalkirti
124. Siddhantasar Deepak — Acharya Sakalkirti
125. Tattvarthasara Deepak — Acharya Sakalkirti
126. Agamasara — Acharya Sakalkirti
127. Meru Mandir Purana — Sri Vamana Muni Ji
128. Praman Granth — Acharya Vajranandi
129. Chaubisi Purana — Acharya Shubhachandra
130. Shrenik Charitra — Acharya Shubhachandra
131. Sri Pandava Purana — Acharya Shubhachandra
132. Sri Shrenik Charitra — Acharya Shubhachandra
133. Chandraprabha Charitra — Acharya Shubhachandra
134. Karakandu Charitra — Acharya Shubhachandra
135. Chandana Charitra — Acharya Shubhchandra
136. Jivandhar Charitr — Acharya Shubhachandra
137. Adhyatmatarangini — Acharya Shubhachandra
138. Prakrit Lakshan — Acharya Shubhachandra
139. Ganitasar Sangrah — Acharya Sridhar
140. Trilokasaratika — Acharya Madhavachand
141. Yogasara Praabhrit — Acharya Amitgati
142. Brihatkathakosha — Acharya Harisena
143. Aradhanasar — Acharya Ravibhadra
144. Acharsar — Acharya Veeranandi
145. Vardhaman Charitra — Acharya Asag
146. Sudansana Chariu — Acharya Nayanandi
147. Ekibhav Stotra — Acharya Vadiraj
148. Puransar collection — Acharya Srichand
149. Vasunandi Sravakacharya — Acharya Vasunandi
150. Bhavana Paddhati — Acharya Padmanandi
151. Angar Dharmaamrita — Pandit Ashadhar
152. Sagar Dharmamrit — Pandit Ashadhar
153. Bharatesh Vaibhav — Mahakavi Ratnakar ji
154. Samaysar Natak — Pandit Banarsidas
155. Brahma Vilas — Bhaiya Bhagwatidas
156. Chhadhala — Pandit Dyantarai
157. Kriya Kosh — Pandit Daulatram (first)
158. Bhav Deepika — Pandit Deepchand
159. Chid Vilas — Pandit Deepchand
160. Parshva Purana — Pandit Bhudhardas
161. Jin Shatak — Pandit Bhudhardas
162. Mokshamarg Prakashak — Pandit Todermal
163. Gommatasara Tika — Pandit Todarmal
164. Labdhisar Tika — Pandit Todermal
165. Kshapanasar Tika — Pandit Todermal
166. Triloksar Tika — Pandit Todermal
167. ?
168. Purusharthsiddhiupayetika — Pandit Todermal
169. Jain Siddhanta Praveshika — Pandit Gopaldasji Baraiya
170. Chhadhala — Pt. Daulatramji (II)
171. Ratnakaranda Vachanika — Pt. Sadasukhdas
172. Samaysar Vachanika — Pt. Jaichand Chavda
173. Chhadhala — Pandit Budhajan
174. Mahavirashtak Stotra — Pandit Bhagchand
175. Jainendra Siddhanta Kosha — Kshullaka Jinendra Varn

== Shvetambara texts ==
Agamas are the main scriptures followed by Jains as preached by Tirthankars. Both Shwetambar and Digambar sects believe in 12 Agamas. Both also believe that the 12th Agama Drishtivaad (Dṛṣṭivāda) was lost over a period of time and realised the need to turn the oral tradition to written. While Digambaras believed that all the 12 Agamas were lost, Shwetambars believed that the first 11 Agamas were not lost. They compiled them in written format in the 6th century CE in Vallabhi, Gujarat. The list is as follows.

=== Agamas ===
There are 45 Agamas (11 Angā Agamas and 34 Angā Bahya Agamas).

==== 11 Angā Agamas ====
1. Āyāraṃga (Sanskrit: Ācāranga, meaning: 'On monastic conduct')
2. Sūyagaḍa (Sūtrakṛtānga, 'On heretical systems and views')
3. Ṭhāṇaṃga (Sthānānga, 'On different points [of the teaching]')
4. Samavāyaṃga (Samavāyānga, 'On rising numerical groups')
5. Viyāha-pannatti / Bhagavaī (Vyākhyā-prajñapti or Bhagavatī, 'Exposition of explanations' or 'the holy one')
6. Nāyā-dhamma-kahāo (Jñāta-dharmakathānga, 'Parables and religious stories')
7. Uvāsaga-dasāo (Upāsaka-daśāḥ, 'Ten chapters on the Jain lay follower')
8. Aṇuttarovavāiya-dasāo (Antakṛd-daśāḥ, 'Ten chapters on those who put an end to rebirth in this very life')
9. Anuttaraupapātikadaśāh (Anuttaropapātika-daśāḥ, 'Ten chapters on those who were reborn in the uppermost heavens')
10. Paṇha-vāgaraṇa (Praśna-vyākaraṇa, 'Questions and explanations')
11. Vivāga-suya (Vipākaśruta, 'Bad or good results of deeds performed')

==== 34 Anga Bahya Agamas ====
The 34 Anga Bahya Agamas consist of 12 Upānga Agamas, 6 Cheda sūtras, 6 Mūla sūtras, and 10 Paiṇṇaya sutras.

Upānga Agamas

1. Uvavāiya-sutta (Sanskrit: Aupapātika-sūtra, 'Places of rebirth')
2. Rāya-paseṇaijja or Rāyapaseṇiya (Rāja-praśnīya, 'Questions of the king')
3. Jīvājīvābhigama (Jīvājīvābhigama, 'Classification of animate and inanimate entities')
4. Pannavaṇā (Prajñāpanā, 'Enunciation on topics of philosophy and ethics')
5. Sūriya-pannatti (Sūrya-prajñapti, 'Exposition on the sun')
6. Jambūdvīpa-pannatti (Jambūdvīpa-prajñapti, 'Exposition on the Jambū continent and the Jain universe')
7. Canda-pannatti (Candra-prajñapti, 'Exposition on the moon and the Jain universe')
8. Nirayāvaliyāo or Kappiya (Narakāvalikā, 'Series of stories on characters reborn in hells')
9. Kappāvaḍaṃsiāo (Kalpāvataṃsikāḥ, 'Series of stories on characters reborn in the kalpa heavens')
10. Pupphiāo (Puṣpikāḥ, 'Flowers' refers to one of the stories')
11. Puppha-cūliāo (Puṣpa-cūlikāḥ, 'The nun Puṣpacūlā')
12. Vaṇhi-dasāo (Vṛṣṇi-daśāh, 'Stories on characters from the legendary dynasty known as Andhaka-Vṛṣṇi')

Cheda sūtras (texts relating to the conduct and behaviour of monks and nuns)

1. Āyāra-dasāo (Sanskrit: Ācāradaśāh, 'Ten [chapters] about monastic conduct', chapter 8 is the famed Kalpa-sūtra)
2. Bihā Kappa (Bṛhat Kalpa, '[Great] Religious code')
3. Vavahāra (Vyavahāra, 'Procedure')
4. Nisīha (Niśītha, 'Interdictions')
5. Jīya-kappa (Jīta-kalpa, Customary rules)
6. Mahā-nisīha (Mahā-niśītha, Large Niśītha)

Mūla sūtras ('Fundamental texts' which are foundational works studied by new monastics)

1. Dasaveyāliya-sutta (Sanskrit: Daśavaikālika-sūtra), this is memorized by all new Jain mendicants
2. Uttarajjhayaṇa-sutta (Uttarādhyayana-sūtra)
3. Āvassaya-sutta (Āvaśyaka-sūtra)
4. Piṇḍa-nijjutti and Ogha-nijjutti (Piṇḍa-niryukti and Ogha-niryukti), Cūlikasūtras ("appendixes")
5. Nandī-sūtra – discusses the five types of knowledge
6. Anuyogadvāra-sūtra – a technical treatise on analytical methods, discusses Anekantavada

Paiṇṇaya sutras (Sanskrit: Prakīrnaka sūtras, "Miscellaneous")

1. Cau-saraṇa (Sanskrit: Catuḥśaraṇa, The 'four refuges')
2. Āura-paccakkhāṇa (Ātura-pratyākhyāna, 'Sick man's renunciation')
3. Bhatta-parinnā (Bhakta-parijñā,'Renunciation of food')
4. Saṃthāraga (Saṃstāraka, 'Straw bed')
5. Tandula-veyāliya (Taṇḍula-vaicārika,'Reflection on rice grains')
6. Canda-vejjhaya (Candravedhyaka, 'Hitting the mark')
7. Devinda-tthaya (Devendra-stava, 'Praise of the kings of gods')
8. Gaṇi-vijjā (Gaṇi-vidyā,'A Gaṇi's knowledge')
9. Mahā-paccakkhāṇa (Mahā-pratyākhyāna,'Great renunciation')
10. Vīra-tthava (Vīra-stava,'Great renunciation')

=== Major scriptures by acharyas ===
Major scriptures by Acharya Umaswati (1st–2nd Century CE)

1. Tattvartha Sutra (On the Nature [artha] of Reality [tattva])
2. Prasamarati (guide for the aspirant on the path of peace and liberation from karmic bondage)

Major scriptures by Acharya Vimalsuri (3rd Century CE)

1. Paumchariya (Jain Ramayan)

Major scriptures by Acharya Haribhadrasuri (8th Century CE)

1. Anekāntajayapatākā [The Victory Banner of Anekantavada (Relativism)] – which puts forward arguments about Anekantavada
2. Anekāntavādapraveśa, discusses Jain Philosophy
3. Anekāntasiddhi – establishes the concept of non-absolutism (anekānta)
4. Ātmasiddhi (Realization of Self), a work about the Soul
5. Upadeśapada, collection of stories which depicts how difficult it is to secure a human birth
6. Daṃsaṇasuddhi, text deals with Samyagdarśana (right faith) and its purity
7. Darisaṇasattari, another work on Samyagdarśana
8. Dhammasangahaṇi, work on Dharma
9. Lokatattvanirṇaya, a work of comparative religion where he talks about Hindu Gods
10. Saṃsāradāvānalastuti, a work praising Thirtankaras
11. Samarāiccakahā, a collection of stories
12. Sambohapayaraṇa, a work on philosophy
13. Ashtakaprakarana (The Eightfold Explanation)
14. Dharmabindu – which outlines the duties of the laity, outlines rules for mendicants, and describes the bliss of moksha
15. Dhūrtākhyāna (The Rogue's Stories)
16. Pañcāśaka – a Prakrit work on rituals and spiritual matters
17. Ṣaḍdarśanasamuccaya (Compendium of Six Philosophies) – which compares Jainism with other schools of Indian philosophy
18. Samarāiccakahā (The Story of Samarāicca) – a narrative which outlines the effects of karma in a story about the enmity of its characters which endures over several reincarnations
19. Sāstravārtāsamuccaya (The Array of Explanatory Teachings
20. Yogabindu (The Seeds of Yoga) – a work on yoga
21. Yogadṛṣṭisamuccaya (An Array of Views on Yoga) – another work on yoga
22. Yogaśataka – a third work on yoga. In these three volumes, he compares the yoga of Jainism with the other varieties of yoga prevalent in India at the time.

Major scriptures by Kalikalsarvagna Acharya Hemachandra (12th Century CE)

1. Triśaṣṭi-śalākā-puruṣa-carita ("Deeds of the 63 Illustrious Men")
2. Pariśiṣṭaparvan (Sthaviravali)
3. Siddha-Hema-Śabdanuśāśana (grammar)
4. Abhidhan-Chintamani (lexicon)
5. Arhanniti, a work on politics from a Jain perspective
6. Kāvyānuśāsana (a work on poetics)
7. Chandonuśāsana (a work on prosody)
8. Pramāṇa-mimaṁsa (epistemology)
9. Vītarāga-Stotra
10. Deśī-Nāmamālā (lexicon of non-Sanskrit origin words)
11. Nighāṇṭuśeṣa (botanical lexicon)

Major scriptures by Acharya Ratnashekharsuri (15th Century CE)

1. Siri-Sirivala-Kaha
2. Śrāddha Vidhi Prakaraṇa

Major scriptures by Mahopādhyāya Yashovijaya (17th Century CE)

1. Ashtasahasri Tatparyavivarana Tika
2. Adhyatmasara
3. Adhyatmopanisatprakarana
4. Dharmapariksa
5. Jaina Nyayakhandakhadya
6. Jaina Tarkabhasa
7. Jnanasara
8. Commentary on Jnanarnava
9. Shripal raja no Ras

== Others ==
- Yogaśāstra
- Siddha-Hema-Śabdanuśāśana
- Trishashthi-Shalaka-Purusha-Charitra
- Bhadrabahu Samhita
- Jnanarnava or the Yogapradipadhikara
- Pramana-mimansa (logic)

== Texts claimed by both the sects ==
- Tattvartha Sutra - first Jain text written in Sanskrit

== Other texts ==
- Ajitha purana
- Antakrddaasah
- Aupapātika
- Anuttaraupapātikadaśāh
- Atma Siddhi
- Aupapatika
- Bahuriband
- Cīvaka Cintāmaṇi
- Drstivada
- Jnatrdharmakathah
- Kalpa Sūtra
- Līlāvatīsāra
- Lokavibhaga
- Nālaṭiyār
- Neelakesi
- Nishitha
- Nivvāṇalīlāvaīkahā
- Palamozhi Naanuru
- Prasnavyakaranani
- Purvas
- Samavayanga Sutra
- Acaranga Sutra
- Shantinatha Charitra
- Silappatikaram
- Sirupanchamoolam
- Sthananga Sutra
- Sutrakritanga
- Upasakadasah
- Vaddaradhane
- Valayapathi
- Varangacharita
- Vikramarjuna Vijaya
- Vipakasruta
- Vyākhyāprajñapti
