= Jambuvijaya =

Indian Jain monk and textual scholar

Muni Jambuvijaya
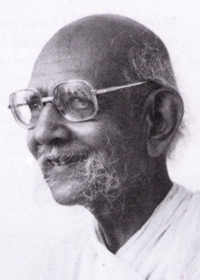
- Official name: Muni Jambuvijaya Maharaj

Personal life
- Born: Chunilal Bhogilal Joitram; 1923 Mandal, Gujarat
- Died: 12 November 2009 Rajasthan
- Cremation place: Shankheshvar
- Parent(s): Bhogilal Mohanlal Joitram, Aniben Popatlal

Religious life
- Religion: Jainism
- Initiation: Jambuvijaya; 1937; Ratlam by Acharya Bhuvanvijaya

Jambuvijaya (1923–2009), also known as Muni Jambuvijayji Maharajsaheb, was a monk belonging to the Tapa Gaccha order of Śvetāmbara sect of Jainism. He was known for his pioneering work in research, cataloguing and translations of Jain Agamas and ancient texts. He was responsible for discovering and publishing many ancient Jains texts lying in different forgotten Jain jnana bhandaras (ancient Jain libraries). He was a disciple of Muni Punyavijay. Both Muni Punyavijay and Jambuvijay worked all their life in the compilation and publication of ancient Jain Agama literature and cataloguing ancient Jain jnana bhandaras. Muni Jambuvijay was a scholar who devoted his entire life to critically editing Jain scriptures.

== Early life and family ==
Jambuvijaya was born as Chunilal Bhogilal Joitram in 1923 in town of Mandal, Gujarat. His father's name was Bhogilal Mohanlal Joitram (1895–1959) and his mother's name was Aniben Popatlal (1894–1995). He was born in a deeply religious family. His father took vow of lifelong celibacy in 1925 and was initiated as a Jain monk Muni Bhuvanvijaya in 1932. His mother took initiation as Sadhavi Manoharashriji in 1939 under her own sister Sadhavi Labhashriji. All of Jambuvijayaji's aunts were initiated as sadhavi's and there were a number of initiations in his mother's family.

== Monkhood ==
In Ratlam in 1937, at the age of 14 he took initiation as a Jain monk under his father, Acarya Bhuvanvijaya, who became his teacher. Later on he studied under Acarya Punyavijaya and assisted him cataloguing various Jain manuscripts. After the death of Muni Punyavijaya, he became the chief editor of the Jain Agama series. Muni Jambuvijayji was a polyglot and knew 16 languages. Among them were Sanskrit, Prakrit, Pali, Apabhramsha, Gujarati, Hindi, Tibetan and some others.

=== Revival of ancient scriptures ===
John E. Cort mentions the difficulties faced and the persistence shown by Muni Jambuvijay in ensuring that ancient manuscripts which were under lock and key were brought to light. Many bhandaras like the one at Patan were unopened for decades or centuries and Muni Jambuvijay had to often use his mendicant charisma to convince the trustee to open up the libraries.

== Agama research and editing ==
List of Books critically edited by Muni Punyavijayji and successor Muni Jambuvijayji:

- Viyah pannati suttam, Part 1
- Viyah pannati suttam, Part 2
- Viyah pannati suttam, Part 3
- Nayadhamma kahao
- Suyagdang sutra
- Dasveyaliya suttam, Uttarjzhayanaim, Avassay suttam
- Sthananga Sutra, Part 1
- Sthananga Sutra, Part 2
- Sthananga Sutra, Part 3
- Painnay Suttai, Part 1
- Painnay Suttai, Part 2
- Painnay Suttai, Part 3
- Nandisutt And Anuogddaraim
- Pannavana Suttam, Part 1
- Pannavana Suttam, Part 2
- Anuyogdwar sutra, Part 1
- Anuyogdwar sutra, Part 2
- Dwadsharam Naychakram, Part 1
- Dwadsharam Naychakram, Part 2
- Dwadsharam Naychakram, Part 3
- Panch sutrakam with Tika
- Aendra Stuti Chaturvinshika Sah Swo Vivran
- Siddhahem sabdanushasana Sah swopagya (San) Laghuvrutti
- Mahapacchakkhan Painniyam
- Divsagar pannatti Painnayam
- Tandulveyaliya Painnayam
- Samavayanga Sutra
- Stree Nirvan Kevalibhukti Prakarane
- Surimantra Kalp Samucchaya
- Thanangsuttam and Samvayangsuttam, Part 3
- Ayarang suttam (Acaranga Sutra)
- Mahanisiha Suya Khandham
- Nandisuttam
- Dasakalia suttam
- Sutrakrutang sutra, Vol. 1
- Hastalikhit Granthsuchi, Part 1
- Hastalikhit Granthsuchi, Part 2
- Hastalikhit Granthsuchi, Part 3

== Death ==
Jambuvijay died in a road accident on 12 November 2009 at the age of 87 years. Early morning, he was travelling by foot along with other monks from Balotra to Jaisalmer when they were hit by a truck. He along with Namaskarvijay died in the accident and others are seriously injured. They were cremated at Shankheshvar on Sami Road in Patan. The deaths of Jain ascetics in road accidents while travelling barefoot, resulted in widespread protests by Jains and they demanded for an investigation.
