= Purvas =

Large body of Jain scriptures

The Fourteen Purvas (meaning ancient or prior knowledge) are a large body of Jain scriptures that was preached by all Tirthankaras (omniscient teachers) of Jainism encompassing the entire gamut of knowledge available in this universe. The persons having the knowledge of purvas were given an exalted status of Shrutakevali or "scripturally omniscient persons". Both the Jain traditions, Śvetāmbara and Digambara hold that all the fourteen purvas have been lost. According to tradition, the Purvas were part of canonical literature and deposited in the third section of Drstivada (the twelfth and last canon). Knowledge of Purvas became fairly vulnerable after Mahavira's nirvana (liberation) and on account of effects of famine, such that, eventually only one person—Bhadrabahu Svami had a command over it. In accordance with the prophecy of Mahavira, the knowledge of Purvas died within 1,000 years of his nirvana and eventually, the whole of Drstivada disappeared as well.(Bhagvati Sutra 20.8) However, a detailed table of contents of the Drstivada and the Purvas has survived in the fourth Anga, Samavāyānga and Nandīsūtra. Furthermore, certain portions of Drstivada and Purvas is said to have survived in Satkhandāgama and Kasāyaprabhrta, especially the doctrine of Karma.

== The Fourteen Purvas ==
Below is a list of the fourteen Purvas, containing various descriptions and details:

1. Utpaad Pūrva: Living (Jiv), non-living (Ajiv), and its modes (Paryāya)
2. Agrayaniya Purva: Nine realities (Navtattva), six substances (Shad-dravya), etc.
3. Viryapravada Purva: Relating to energy of soul, non-living, etc.
4. Asti Nasti Pravada Purva: Multiplicity of views (Anekāntvād), Saptabhangi, etc.
5. Jnana Prāvada Pūrva: Five types of knowledge and three types of ignorance, etc.
6. Satya Pravada Purva: Relating to truth, restraint, silence (Maun), speech, etc.
7. Atma pavada Purva: Analysis of soul from different view points (naya)
8. Karma Pravada Pūrva: Theory of karma, its bondage, influx, its nature, fruition, shedding
9. Pratyakhyana Purva: Giving up (Pachchhakhān), restraint, vows, detachment, etc.
10. Vidyā Pravāda Purva: Expertise (vidyā), exceptional abilities, practice
11. Kalyana Pravada Purva: Spiritual alertness (Apramād) and laziness (Pramād)
12. Prana Pravada Purva: Ten types of life substances or vitalities (Prān), life span, etc.
13. Kriyā Visala Purva: Skills, 64 arts of women, 84 arts of men, etc.
14. Lokbindusā Purva: Three parts of universe including heavens and hells, mathematics, etc.

The contents of the Purvas was so vast, that the tradition holds that, the first one is written by the volume of the ink that is equivalent to the size of one elephant. Second one is two times larger, and third one is two times larger than second one and so on. It was said that, all efforts to describe the knowledge of Purva in words were in vain. It provided detailed information about six kinds of reals or substances, all kinds of living creatures, the things which were to exist for eternal time, those which were to come into existence for a transient time and their time of extinction, five kinds of knowledge, truth, soul, karma, mantra, benefits of austerities, the lifestyle of ascetics and householders, birth, death and a detailed description of the whole universe. It also contained various knowledge on attainment of exceptional abilities including attainment of various magical powers.

== The Srutakevalis ==
The persons having the knowledge of purvas were known as Srutakevali or "scripturally omniscient persons". They were one step away from attaining enlightened or Kevala Jnana. The following persons had the knowledge of Purvas after Mahavira:

1. Ganadhara Gautam Swami
2. Ganadhara Sudharma Swami
3. Jambuswami

These three persons also attained Kevala Jnana or enlightenment and were subsequently liberated. After Jambu Svami, the following Heads of the Jaina Order who were his successors had knowledge of the entire 14 Purvas:

1. Prabhava
2. Sayyambhava
3. Yashobhadra
4. Sambhutavijaya
5. Bhadrabahu
6. Sthulabhadra: Although he is said to have had knowledge of all 14 purvas, the meaning of the last four purvas was not revealed to him.

== Loss of the Purvas ==
The Indologist Hermann Jacobi is of the opinion that there is an element of truth in the existence of Purvas or ancient knowledge; however, he held a view that Dristivada contained an abstract of the Purvas, rather than the entire text of the Purvas itself. According to him, it is no coincidence that the knowledge of Purvas started fading away simultaneously with the redaction of the new canon. He is of the opinion that the Drstivada containing a disputation of the views of heretical traditions may no longer have served a purpose, once the rival traditions became extinct.

On the other hand, Acarya Hemachandra's Parishishtaparva, also known as Sthaviravali (stories on the lives of elders or Jain patriarchs), contains detailed information as to how the knowledge of the Purvas was lost. Bhadrabahu Svami was the last person to have the knowledge of the entire 14 Purvas. He refused to teach the last four Purvas to his chief disciple Sthulibhadra, who had used his knowledge of the Purvas to display magical powers. Bhadrabahu, foreseeing the loss of the Purvas and a decline of morality and conduct, ultimately agreed to teach Sthulabhadra the rest of the Purvas, on the condition that he should not hand down the last four Purvas to anybody else. Hence, Sthulabhadra, in turn, taught his disciples Mahagiri and Suhastin only ten Purvas, for he was forbidden to teach the last four Purvas to anybody. Gradually, with the growth of schisms and the inability of monks to commit the scriptures to memory, the knowledge of the Purvas and of the Dristivada became extinct.
