= Vimalsuri =

3rd century Indian Jain ascetic

Acharya Vimalsuri Maharaj Saheb

Religious life
- Religion: Jainism
- Sect: Śvetāmbara
- Initiation: by Acharya Vijayasuri

Vimalsuri was a Jain monk. There is some dispute about his sect Śvetāmbara or Digambara. Some scholars regard him as a Yapaniya, a sect that combined elements of both sects. He is best known for his composition "Paumachariyam", the earliest known Jain version of the Ramayana and the oldest work of literature written in Maharashtri Prakrit. Although scholars' opinion and traditional beliefs differ on his timeline, the common belief is that he lived between the 1st and the 3rd century AD.

== Biography ==
Very little is known about him, given his timeline. However, his work "Paumachariyam" describes a short Pattavali mentioning him. It mentions Acharya Vijayasuri as his preceptor and initiator, while Acharya Rahu as his preceptor's (Acharya Vijayasuri) preceptor.

According to the Parishishtaparvan, composed by Hemachandra, and the original text of "Paumachariyam", it is clear that Vimalsuri belonged to the Nailakulavamś. Dr. Hermann Jacobi finds that until 12th century AD, it was known as Nailakulavamś or Nāgila-kula or Nagendrakula. Later, it continued under the name Nagendragaccha (one of the 84 Gacchas of the Śvetāmbara Murtipujakas) and it altogether disappeared by the 15th century AD. Therefore, without much deliberation, Dr. Hermann Jacobi finds that Vimalsuri belonged to the Śvetāmbara sect. Going by his descriptions of worshipping Tirthankara idols in "Paumachariyam", mentions of the Nailakulavamś or Nagendragaccha (which traces its identity to the Śvetāmbara sect), and the use of Maharashtri Prakrit (a language known for non-canonical works of Śvetāmbaras only) for the composition of "Paumachariyam", he is considered to have been belonging to the Śvetāmbara Murtipujaka sect.

The appendix at the end of "Paumachariyam" describe Vimalsuri as a "Purvadhari" (the one who knows the "purvas"). This is corroborated by the Śvetāmbara belief that "Purvadhaaris" flourished for at least a millennium after Mahavira attained nirvana.

On analyzing the text, it is discovered that Vimalsuri possessed a sound knowledge of the Jain literature, Jain cosmology, Jain ethics, and the science of interpreting and analyzing dreams, signs, and omens. According to Dr. Hermann Jacobi, Vimalsuri would have been a sound writer and not a "slavish imitator" when comparing Valmiki's Ramayana and "Paumachariyam". Some passages from "Paumachariyam" also remind one of the Jain Aagams that are followed by the Śvetāmbara Murtipujakas.

Vimalsuri, in "Paumachariyam", identifies himself as a poet by calling his work "Purāņa". It has also been identified as a "Mahākāvya" (epic poem) as it is full of figures of speech such as "Ropaka," "Utprekşā," "Upamā," "Arthăntaranyāsa," etc.

== Paumachariyam: The first Jain ramayana ==
It is considered to be the oldest work of literature in Maharashtri Prakrit.

According to Vimalsuri, this story was told to him by his preceptor, Acharya Vijayasuri. He further mentions that this story has been handed down to disciples in the form of a "list of names" through a succession of Jain monks, starting with Mahavira telling it to Gautama Swami, who, in turn, told it to his disciples and so on.

He also mentions that he composed it 530 years after the Mahavira attained moksha. Therefore, according to traditional accounts, since Mahavira's nirvana happened in 526 BC, this work would have to have been written in 4 AD. However, since scholars believe that Mahavira's moksha occurred in 467 BC, it is highly likely that it was composed in 67 AD.

"Paumachariyam" also has the main elements of every version of the Ramayana, such as the Ikshavaku clan rule Dashratha ruling over Ayodhya, Rama have 3 brothers, Sita being the daughter of Janaka, Ravana abducting Sita owing to her marvelous beauty, and finally, the story of Sugriva, the aggrieved Vaanara prince of Kishkindha. Jain Mythology is mainly about the 63 illustrious men (shalakapurushas). In every half cycle of time, 63 such illustrious men are born. Of them, there are 9 Baldevas, 9 Vasudevas, and 9 Prativasudevas. According to "Paumachariyam", Rama was the 8th Baldeva, Lakshmana was the 8th Vasudeva, and Ravana was the 8th Prativasudeva. In a general sense, Vasudevas defeat Prativasudevas with the help of Baldevas. As Vasudevas are the ones who fight the Prativasudevas, Lakshmana is the one who kills Ravana in "Paumachariyam". This is one of the most distinctive elements that differentiate Vimalsuri's work from Valmiki's work. Another one of the features that distinguish the two is that in "Paumachariyam", Rama becomes a Siddha by becoming a Jain monk, destroying all his karma, attaining omniscience, and subsequently attaining nirvana. Sita dies and is reborn as a demi-god in heaven. Lakshmana and Ravana die and go to hell due to the violence they wreak and the associated karma. Ravana will become a Tirthankara in the next (ascending) half cycle of time - Utsarpini.

Apart from these, he incorporates several principles of Jainism such as non-violence, chastity, ill consequences of eating flesh, painful description of life in hell within his work. He also adds extremely beautiful and poetic descriptions of oceans, cities, towns, lakes, rivers, and forests. He does not hesitate from adding narrations of several legends and romantic accounts, which, in Dr. Hermann Jacobi's words, are extremely beautiful.

== Importance in Jain literature ==
Scholars unanimously agree that "Paumachariyam" was written in a time not later than the 3rd century AD, making it the first ever Jain version of the Ramayana. According to the well-known German Indologist, Dr. Hermann Jacobi, Vimalsuri's "Paumachariyam" is the first Jain version of Ramayana. He extends his argument by mentioning his findings after studying most versions of the Jain versions of the Ramayana, that all the later authors, namely Ravisena, Gunabhadra, Hemachandrasuri, Dhaneshvarsuri, Svayambhu, Silachārya, Bhadreśvara, Haribhadrasuri, Devavijaygani, Meghavijaygani, either completely or partially derive inspiration from Vimalsuri's "Paumachariyam".

"Paumachariyam", and Ravisena's "Padmacharitra" are largely considered to be the two major versions of Jain Ramayana. After studying both the works, most scholars like Dr. Hermann Jacobi concludes that even though Ravisena does not declare his source explicitly, his work heavily relies upon Vimalsuri's "Paumachariyam".

Another major work authored by Vimalsuri was "Harivamsa-cariya", which was, according to Dr. Hermann Jacobi, most likely, a work on the Jain version of the Mahabharata. However, the original text of "Harivamsa-cariya" was lost in course of time. The language of both the texts, "Harivamsa-cariya", and "Paumachariyam" is Maharashtri Prakrit.

== Sources ==
- Paumchariyam Part 1 by Muni Punyavijay and Dr. Hermann Jacobi, republished in 2005 by Prakrit Granth Parishad
- Paumchariyam Part 2 by Muni Punyavijay and Dr. Hermann Jacobi, republished in 2005 by Prakrit Granth Parishad
- Bharatiya Jyotişasastra (pp. 139, 511), by S. B. Dixit, Aryabhūşap Press, Poona, 1931
- Jaina Sahitya Aura Itihāsa (second edition, 1956): Padmacharita Aura Paimachariya, pp. 89–91.

== See also ==
- Devardhigani Kshamashraman
- Salakapurusa
- Maharashtri Prakrit
- Rama in Jainism
