= Samavayanga Sutra =

Catalogs Jain elements via numeric classification

Information
- Religion: Jainism
- Period: 300 BCE

Samavāyāṅga Sūtra (c. 3rd-4th century BCE) is the 4th amongst the 12 Angas of the Jaina canon. The sutra is believed to have been composed by Gaṇadhara Sudharmasvāmī. This text contains the essence of Jain religion, defined and catalogued systematically. Written c. 300 BCE, it is a part of the collection of texts containing Lord Mahavira’s teachings, collectively termed as Agama Sutras. Additionally, it includes one of the earliest references to the Indian writing tradition.

== Subject matter of the Agama ==
Samavāyāṅga Sūtra contains elements of mathematics and astronomy. One of the interesting aspects of this text is its portrayal of Monasticism and spirituality in the terms of numerology.

Mathematics - The Samavāyāṅga Sūtra seems to be in continuation of the Sthananga Sutra and follows the numeric method of describing substances from 1 to 1 billion.

Astronomy – It contains discussion on Mount Meru, the jyotiścakra, the Jambudvīpa, the measurements used in the Jaina canon, the Jaina Loka, the different types of Earth, the 7 Hells, the increase in water levels in the Lavana ocean and like.

It also gives information on the subject matter of the 14 Pūrva and the 12th Aṅga, Drstivada. Being one of the oldest and most referred texts, it forms the backbone of the Jaina literature. There is a description of the life-span of the Gods in the Samavāyāṅga Sūtra. There is also a mention of the days of their inhalation and exhalation. It further defines and catalogues the main substances of the Jain religion from a different perspective than the Sthānaṅga Sūtra. Furthermore, it contains references to the Damili script, an early Tamil script known as Tamili.
