= Rama in Jainism =

Jain illustrious person

Padma Ramachandra
- God in Jainism
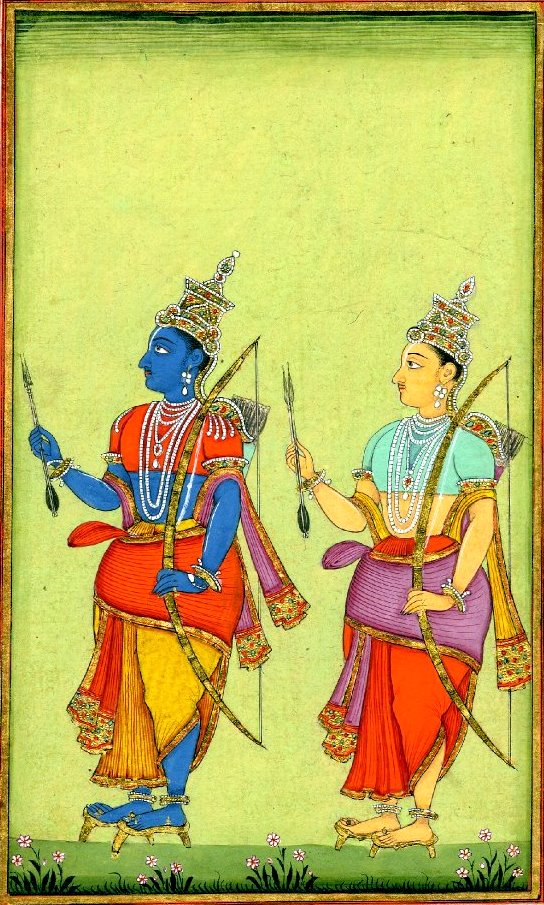
- Rama and Lakshmana are the eighth set of Baladeva/Balabhadra and Vasudeva/Narayana according to the Jain universal history.
- Other names: Padma
- Predecessor: Dasharatha

Genealogy
- Born: Ayodhya
- Died: Tungi Giri; ~attained Moksha
- Parents: Dasharatha (father); Kaushalya (mother)
- Siblings: Half-Brothers: • Lakshmana • Bharata • Shatrughna
- Consort: Sita
- Children: Sons: • Anangalavana • Madanankusha

Rama (Rāma), the hero of Ramayana, is described in the Jain scriptures as one of sixty-three illustrious persons, known as Salakapurusa. Among these, there are nine sets of Balabhadra, Vasudeva and Prati-Vasudeva. Rama was the 8th Balabhadra with Lakshmana and Ravana being his Vasudeva and Prati-Vasudeva counterparts. He is described as a young prince who is deprived of his throne and turned into a pauper. While living in exile his wife Sita is kidnapped by Ravana, King of Lanka. Rama then rescues Sita with the help of his brother Lakshmana and King Sugriva. Ravana is killed by Lakshmana (a deviation from the Hindu epic where Rama slays Ravana) and they both go into hell. Rama becomes a Jain muni and his soul attains moksha (liberation from the cycle of birth and death). Sita becomes a Jain sadhvi and is born into heaven as Indra.

According to Nirvana Kanda Rama attained nirvana at Tungi Giri in Maharashtra, where the Jains worship his footprints and divine Idol.

== Sources ==
The story of Rama in Jainism can be broadly classified into three groups; Samghadasa's version, Vimalsuri's version and Gunabhadra's version. Some of the early works which deal with Rama are:

Vimalsuri's version

Author	Language	Work
Vimalsuri	Prakrit	Paumchariya (3rd century CE)
Shilankacharya	Prakrit	Chaupannamahapurusa Chariyam
Haribhadra	Prakrit	Dhurtakhyana
Bhadreshvara	Prakrit	Khavali
Shilankacharya	Prakrit	Chaupannamahapurusa Chariyam
Ravisena	Sanskrit	Padmapurana
Yogashastra Vrtti	Sanskrit	Hemachandra
Hemchandra	Sanskrit	Trishashtisalakapurusha Charitra
Dhaneshvara	Sanskrit	Shatrunjaya Mahatman
Svayambhu	Apbhramsha	Paumachariya

Gunabhadra's Version

Author	Language	Work
Gunabhadra	Sanskrit	Uttarapurana (9th century CE)
Krishna	Sanskrit	Punyachandrodaya
Pushpadanta	Apbhramsha	Mahapurana

Samghadasa's version

Author	Language	Work
Samghadasa Gani	Prakrit	Vasudevahindi (3rd century CE)
Harisena	Prakrit	Kathakosha

Some of the later works which mention the story of Rama are:

- Ramayana of Jinadasa (c. 15th century CE)
- Ramacharitra of Padmadevavijaya Gani (c. 16th century CE)
- Ramacharitra of Somadeva Suri (c. 16th century CE)
- Laghu-Trishashtisalakapurusha Charitra of Somaprabha (c. 15th century CE)
- Padmapurana of Raidhu in Apbhramsha (c. 15th century CE)
- Padma-Ramayana of Nagchandra in Kannada (c. 11th century CE)
- Ramacharita of Devavijayaganir (c. 1596 CE)
- Laghu-Trishashtisakalapurusha Charitra of Meghvijaya (c. 17th century CE)

== Story ==
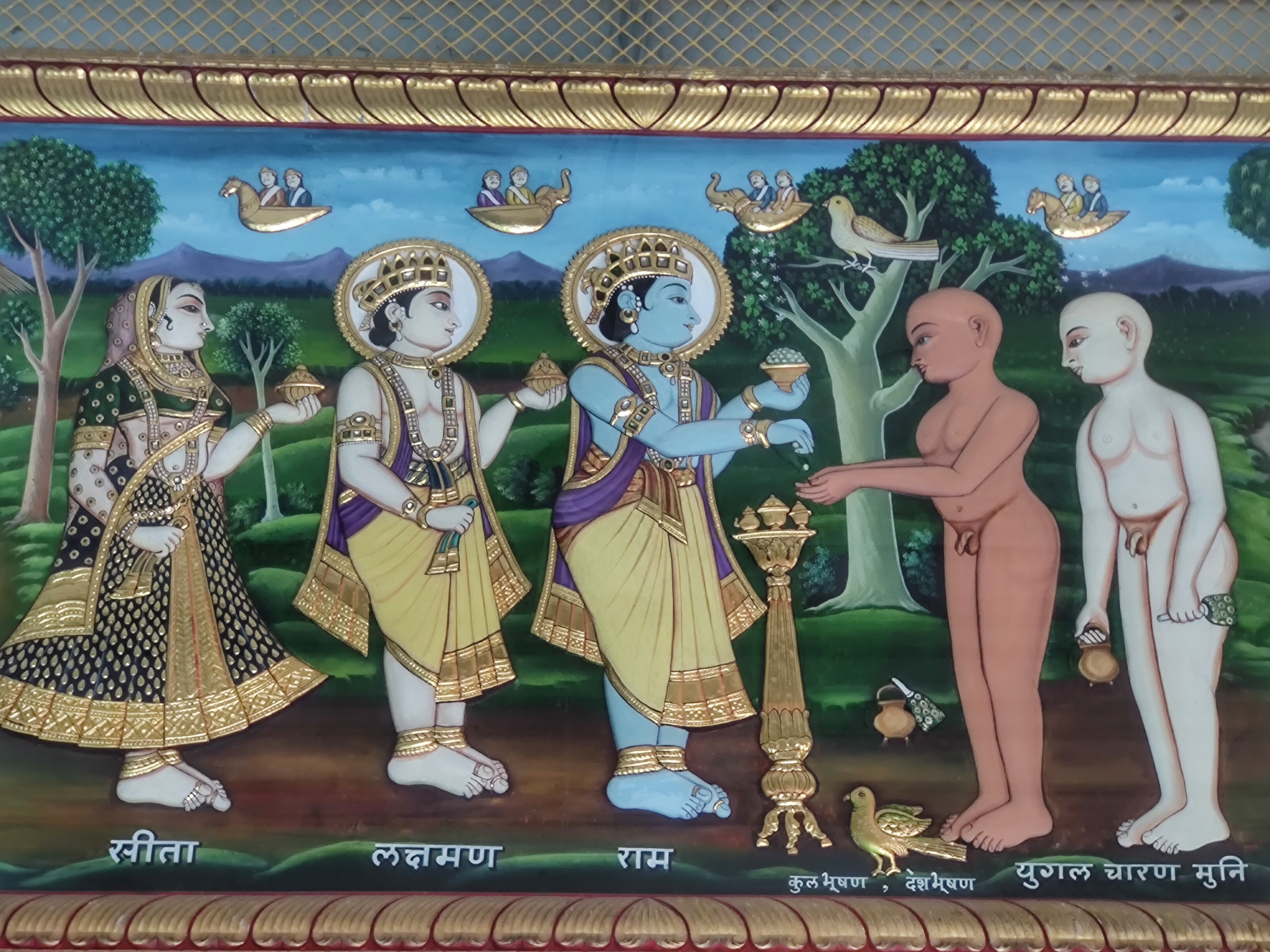
Rama, Lakshmana, and Sita with Jain acharya yugal-charan, Swarn Jain temple in Gwalior.

Following is the outline of Rama story from the Jain narratives:

Dasharatha was the king of Ikshvaku dynasty who ruled Ayodhya. He had four princes: Padma (Rama), Narayana(Lakshmana), Bharata and Shatrughna. Janaka ruled Videha. His daughter Sita was married to Rama. Sita was kidnapped by Ravana, who took her to his kingdom Lanka. During the search for Sita, Rama and Lakshmana meet Sugriva and Hanuman. Sugriva, the king of the Vanara clan was removed from his throne of Kiskindha by his brother Vali (Vali later becomes a Jain Monk and attains Moksha). Rama and Lakshmana help Sugriva get back his kingdom, after which they, along with the army of Sugriva marched towards Lanka.

Ravana's younger brother, Vibhishana, tried to persuade him to return Sita. However, Ravana refused to do so. Therefore, Vibhishana allied with Rama. There was a war fought between the armies of Rama and Ravana. Lakshmana kills Ravana in the end(deviating from the Ramayana where the hero Rama slays Ravana) and Vibhishana is crowned King of Lanka. Rama and Lakshmana return to Ayodhya. Rama had around eight thousand wives among whom Sita was the principal consort (whereas in the Valmiki Ramayana, Sita was Rama's only wife), and Lakshmana had around sixteen thousand wives in which Prithvisundari was his principal consort (in the Hindu epic, he had only one wife, Urmila). After Lakshmana's death, Rama becomes a monk. He attains Kevala Jnana and subsequently moksha. Lakshmana and Ravana, on the other hand, go to hell. Sita was born in heaven.

=== Vimalsuri's Version ===
Vimalsuri's version is one of the most important and influential Jain stories of Rama. In his version, Kaikeyi is shown to be a generous and affectionate mother who wanted to stop Bharata from becoming a monk. To do so, she wanted to give him the responsibility of a king. Ravana was also called Dasamukha (ten-headed one) because when he was young, his mother gave him a necklace made of nine pearls. She could see his face reflected ninefold. Hence, he was named thus. In Vimalsuri's Paumachariya, Rama married thrice when he was in exile. His brother Lakshmana married eleven times. Ravana was well known for his abilities in meditation and ascetic practices. He was the king of Rakshasa, a kingdom of civilized and vegetarian people. Sugriva was appointed by his brother Vali to become the king before Vali renounces the world and becomes a Jain monk. Shambuka was accidentally killed by Lakshmana. Ravana had passionate feelings for Sita. Due to the effects of karma (caused because of this vice), he was said to have suffered at the end.

==== Ravisena's Padmapurana ====
The story of Rama in Jainism is found in Ravisena's Padmapurana (Lorebook of the Lotus) is termed as one of the most artistic Jain Ramayana by Dundas. He belonged to the Digambara sect of Jainism and hence removes almost every Svetambara elements that was present in the tale.

==== Svayambhu's Paumachariyu ====
In Svayambhu's version, Rama is son of Aparajita and Lakshmana is son of Sumitra. Sita is shown to be daughter of Janaka. There is also a narration about Sita's brother Bhamandala. He did not know about Sita being his sister and wanted to marry her. He even wanted to abduct her. This narration ends when Bhamandala, after knowing that Sita is his sister, turns into a Jain ascetic.

=== Sanghadasa's Version ===
Sanghadasa's version presents only a brief account of Rama's story. In this version, Dasharatha had three queens; Kaushalya, Kaikeyi and Sumitra. Rama was from Kaushalya, Lakshmana from Sumitra, Bharata and Satrughna from Kaikeyi.

Sita is said to be daughter of Ravana's queen Mandodari. It was predicted that the first child of Mandodari would bring annihilation to the family. Hence, Ravana deserted the child when she was born. The minister who was responsible for this took her in a pearl-box, placed her near a plough and told Janaka of Mithila that the girl is born from the trench. Janaka's queen Dharini became Sita's foster mother.

While in exile, Rama visited a place called Vijanasthana. Surpanakha was dumbstruck at the beauty of Rama and wanted to marry him. However, Rama refused to marry another person's wife. He in turn cut her ears and nose after she was scolded by Sita. Surpanakha complained about this to her brothers Khara and Dusana who were killed by Rama on their quest for revenge. Surpanakha then goes to her brother Ravana.

==== Harisena's KathaKosa ====
In Harisena's Kathakosa, there is an incident where Rama asks Sita to give the famous Agnipariksha. When Sita steps into the fire, the whole area turns into a lake. A Jain nun appears and Sita and others around her become Jain ascetics.

=== Gunabhadra's Version ===
In the story of Gunabhadra, Dasharatha lived in Varanasi. His queen Subala gave birth to Rama and Kaikeyi gave birth to Lakshmana. Sita was born of Ravana and Mandodari. She was subsequently abandoned by Ravana in a place where Janaka was ploughing the field.

==== Pushpadanta's Mahapurana ====
Pushpadanta gives elaborate description of the marriage between Rama and Sita.

== See also ==
- Vimalsuri
- Diwali (Jainism)
