= Antakrddaasah =

Information
- Religion: Jainism

Antakrddaaśāh is the eighth of the 12 Jain āgamas said to be promulgated by Māhavīra himself. Antakrddaaśāh translated as "Ten Chapters on End-Makers" is said to have been composed by Ganadhara Sudharmaswami as per the Śvetámbara tradition.

The Antakrddaaśāh describes individuals whose austerities led them to nirvana. It contains stories from the time of Nemi, the twenty-second Tirthankara.

The text contains the biographies of ten ascetics in the order of Mahāvīra: Nami, Mataṅga, Somila, Rāmaputra, Sudarśana, Yamalīka, Valīka, Kiṣkambala, Pāla, and Ambaṣṭhaputra.
