= Anuttaraupapātikadaśāh =

Information
- Religion: Jainism

Anuttaraupapātikadaśāh is the ninth of the 12 Jain angas said to be promulgated by Māhavīra himself. Anuttaraupapātikadaśāh translated as "Ten Chapters about the arisers in the Highest Heavens" is said to have been composed by Ganadhara Sudharmaswami as per the Śvetámbara tradition.

== Content ==
Within the Jain scriptures, the Anuttaraupapātikadaśāh is a key text that recounts the legends of monks performing extreme austerities. It deals with those who have succeeded in attaining rebirth in the highest heavens.

The text contains the biographies of ten ascetics in the order of Mahāvīra: Ṛṣidāsa, Vānya, Sunakṣatra, Kārtika, Nanda, Nandana, Śālibhadra, Abhaya, Vāriṣeṇa, and Cilātaputra.

== English translations ==
Popular English translations are:

- Illustrated SRI ANUTTARAUPAPATIKADASA SUTRA Prakrit Gatha - Hindi exposition - English exposition and Appendices Ed. by Pravartaka Amar Muni, Shrichand Surana Saras, Eng. tr. by Surendra Bothra
