= Prasnavyakaranani =

One of the twelve Jain sacred books

Information
- Religion: Jainism

Praśnavyākaranani, meaning "Questions and Explanations", is the tenth of the 12 Jain Angas. According to the Śvetámbara tradition, it is said to have been promulgated by Māhavīra himself and composed by Ganadhara Sudharmaswami. It discusses a variety of doctrinal matters concerning Jainism.

== Subject matter ==
The Praśnavyākaranani discusses the five major adharmas of Jainism: murder, lying, theft, unchastity, and greed. Afterwards, it discusses their opposites, the five major dharmas.
