= Mulachara =

Jain text discussing the conduct of a Digambara monk

Information
- Religion: Jainism
- Author: Acharya Vattakera
- Language: Prakrit
- Period: 150 CE
- Chapters: 12
- Verses: 1243

Mulachara (Mūlacāra) (Fundamental Conduct) is a Jain text composed by Acharya Vattakera of the Digambara tradition, around 150 CE. Mulachara discusses anagara-dharma – the conduct of a Digambara monk. It consists twelve chapters and 1,243 verses on (mendicant discipline). It is also called Digambara Acharanga. It is said to be derived from the original Ācārāṅga Sūtra and discusses the conduct of a Digambara monk.

The text is written in a dialect that is distinct but shares characteristics with Ardhamagadhi. Its dialect has been called Digambara Sauraseni (or Jain Sauraseni) and proposed to reflect the language of ancient Mathura region by Indian scholars. Many characteristics of the Mulachara manuscript, as found in Karnataka, share elements of monastic conduct found in Śvetāmbara scriptures. Some of the verses of Mulaccara are almost same as those found in Śvetāmbara's Dasavaikalika. This suggests the existence of an ancient shared textual tradition between Digambaras and Śvetāmbara, one that likely split and differentiated later.

Vasunandin wrote a Sanskrit commentary on the Mulacara, and it is titled Acaravrtti.

== See also ==
- List of Jain texts
