= Upasakadasah =

Information
- Religion: Jainism

Upāsakadaśāh is the seventh of the 12 Jain Angas said to be promulgated by Māhavīra himself. Upāsakadaśāh translated as "Ten Chapters on Lay Attenders" is said to have been composed by Ganadhara Sudharmaswami as per the Śvetāmbara tradition.

== Subject matter ==
The Upāsakadaśāh describes the duties of lay Jain. It details their prescribed observances, various types of temptations they may face, and what a successful life might look like.

== English translations ==
Popular English Translations are:- Illustrated SRI UPASAKADASA SUTRA Prakrit Gatha - Hindi exposition - English exposition and Appendices Ed. by Pravartaka Amar Muni, Shrichand Surana, Eng. tr. by Surendra Bothra

== Bibliography ==
- Upāsakadaśāḥ, text and trans. in Hoernlé, A. F. R. (1890). The Uvāsagadasāo or the Religious Experience of an Uvāsaga. Calcutta.
