= Aupapatika =

Information
- Religion: Jainism
- Period: 1st-2nd century CE

Aupapātika (c. 1st-2nd century CE) forms part of the 12 Jain upanga āgamas as per Śvetámbara tradition. Aupapātika is translated as “Spontaneously Arising” so named as it contains descriptions of Heavenly beings and Hellish beings who are born spontaneously.

== Subject matter ==
It contains descriptions of Devs (heavenly beings) who are born in heavens and hellish beings born in hells. It also contains an elaborate account of Mahavira’s preaching and descriptions of the mechanism which brings about attainment of liberation.
