= Yasas =

Yasas is both a given name and a surname. Notable people with the name include:

- Yasas Alwis (born 1992), Sri Lankan cricketer
- Raveen Yasas (born 1999), Sri Lankan cricketer
- Ravindra Yasas (born 1964), Sri Lankan actor
