= Drstivada =

Lost text in the Jain religion

Information
- Religion: Jainism

The Dṛṣṭivāda or Drishtivaad ("Disputation about views") is a lost text in the Jain religion. It is the last of the 12 Jain āgamas as per Śvetámbara tradition, said to be promulgated by Māhavīra himself and composed by Ganadhara Sudharmaswami.

The text is traditionally said to contain the entire knowledge of the Fourteen Purvas. However, its contents have been referred and explained in Nandi and Samavāyānga Sūtra.

== Subdivisions ==
The Dristivāda was divided into five parts, according to the Sarvārthasiddhi commentary from the Digambara tradition.

1. Parikarma, containing Jaina calculatory science
2. Sūtra, containing discussion about creeds and narratives
3. Prathamānuyoga (Pūrvanayoga), containing Puranic narratives, religious biographies, and illustrative tales
4. Pūrvagata, with fourteen subdivisions, containing discussions about Jaina doctrines and principles and may have been composed before the time of Mahavira
5. Cūlikā, containing the Purvas, knowledge prior to Mahavira which was preserved only in oral form
