= Somila =

Somila is a South African given name. Notable people with the surname include:

- Somila Seyibokwe (born 1987), South African cricketer
- Somila Ntsundwana (born 1996), South African soccer player
- Somila Jho (born 1995), South African rugby union player
