= Āvaśyaka Sūtra =

Jain religious text

Information
- Religion: Jainism
- Language: Jain Prakrit

The Āvaśyaka Sūtra is one of the four Mūlasūtra texts of the Śvetāmbara scriptural canon.

== Contents ==
=== Six Obligatory Actions ===
The Āvaśyaka Sūtra lists the six Obligatory Actions, which Jain ascetics are required to follow. They are:

1. equanimity (sāmāyika / samatā)
2. praise (bhakti) of the fordmakers
3. homage to the teacher (vandana)
4. repentance (pratikramaṇa)
5. laying down the body (kāyotsarga)
6. abandonment (pratyākhyāna)

The first obligatory action of equanimity (sāmāyika) is described in Chapter 2 of the Āvaśyaka Sūtra as such:

I perform, sir, the rite of equanimity. I abandon all bad activity for the course of my life, threefold by threefold, in mind, body and speech. I will not perform nor cause anybody to perform nor approve anybody performing any bad action. I repent of it, sir, I censure, reject and abandon myself.

The fourth obligatory action of repentance (pratikramaṇa) is described in Chapter 32 of the Āvaśyaka Sūtra:

I ask pardon from all living creatures. May all creatures pardon me. May I have friendship for all creatures and enmity towards none.
