= Ravisena =

7th-century Indian Jain monk

Acharya Ravisena
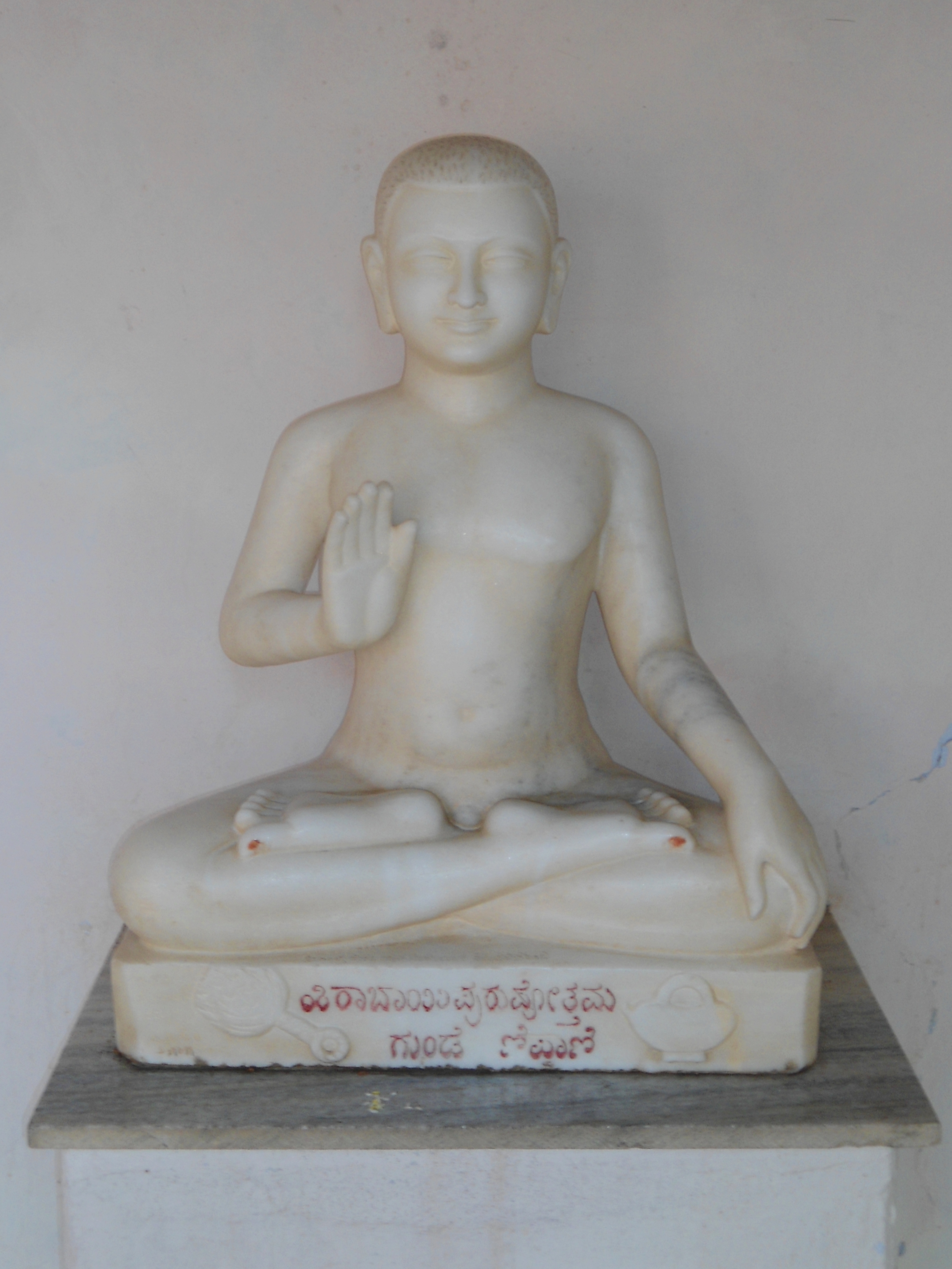
- Image of digambar acharya (head of the monastic order)
- Official name: Acharya Ravisena

Religious life
- Religion: Jainism
- Sect: Digambara

Acharya Ravisena was a seventh century Digambara Jain Acharya, who wrote Padmapurana (Jain Ramayana) in Sanskrit in 678 AD.

Padmapurana is said to follow Paumachariya, although it sometimes departs from it. In the Jain tradition, Rama is a Balabhadra, who is non-violent. According to Padma Purana, Ravana was killed by Lakshmana. After having rules for many years, Rama, became a muni and eventually attained nirvana.
