= Vyākhyāprajñapti =

Information
- Religion: Jainism
- Language: Prakrit

Vyākhyāprajñapti (Sanskrit: व्याख्याप्रज्ञप्ति "Exposition of Explanations"), commonly known as the Bhagavati Sūtra (भगवतीसूत्र), is the fifth of the 12 Jain Angas said to be promulgated by Mahāvīra. The Vyākhyāprajñapti is said to have been composed by Sudharmaswami by the Śvētāmbara school of Jainism; it is written in Jain Prakrit. It is the largest text of the canon, said to contain 36,000 questions answered by Mahavira. The subject matter of the answers ranges from doctrine to rules of ascetic behaviour.

== Contents ==
The Vyākhyāprajñapti is divided into 41 sections known as shatakas. It follows a question and answer pattern. The questions are raised by Gautama, Makandiputra, Roha, Agnibhuti and Vayubhuti, Skandaka, Jayanti and others. Briefly, the answers may be categorised under the following topics:

- ascetic conduct
- the six substances
- ontology
- reincarnation
- geography
- cosmology
- mathematics
- obstetrics
- famous contemporaries of Mahavira

Miscellaneous subjects outside of those mentioned above are also addressed.
