= Sthananga Sutra =

Jain text

Information
- Religion: Jainism
- Period: 3rd–4th century BCE

Sthananga Sutra (Sanskrit: Sthānāṅgasūtra; Prakrit: Ṭhāṇaṃgasutta) (c. 4th–3rd century BCE) forms part of the first eleven Angas of the Jaina Canon which have survived despite the bad effects of this Hundavasarpini kala as per the Śvetāmbara belief. This is the reason why, under the leadership of Devardhigani Ksamasramana, the eleven Angas of the Śvetāmbara canon were formalised and reduced to writing. This took place at Valabhi 993 years after Māhavīra's nirvana. (466 CE). In the vacana held at Valabhi, in Gujarat, the Sthananga Sutra was finalised and redacted. The language used is Ardhamāgadhī Prakrit. The mula sutras of the Sthananga Sutra are difficult to understand without the help of a commentary or tika. Hence, in the 11th century CE, Abhayadevasuri wrote a comprehensive Sanskrit gloss on the Sthananga Sutra.

== Description ==
The Sthānāngasūtra is known in Prakrit as the Thanam. Hence, the style of the Sthananga Sutra is unique. It is divided into ten chapters, and each chapter enumerates certain topics according to their numbers. Each chapter is titled as a Thana. (Sanskrit: Sthānā) This āgama defines and catalogues the main substances of the Jain metaphysics. Diverse topics such as the Dharmakathanuyoga, Carananuyoga, Karananuyoga and Dravyanuyoga are covered. While the focus is on Karananuyoga, this unique āgama serves as a huge anthology to all branches of Jaina knowledge.

Because all topics, terms and things are thought of as fitting well with number one, number two, and so on, up to number ten, and because they are listed accordingly, the word "sthāna" in the titles of the ten chapters as well as in the title of our work means "place". The Sthānāngasūtra is an anga-text in which "terms and things" are listed in their "right place". Sthānānga maybe considered as a memory aid for an ācārya, so that he might not forget the varied subject matters he wants to teach. With this work he has a kind of guideline for his lessons at hand and can easily reply to questions asked by his disciples.

Importance of Sthānāngasūtra can be gauged from the fact that Vyavahāra Chedasūtra (10, 20-34) mentions that it is suitable to be studied only by those ascetics, who have at least eight years standing in monkhood. Furthermore it is stated that only a monk who knows the Sthānānga by heart may attain the position of an ācārya, which entitles him to supervise the monks and nuns in regard to their conduct and study.

== Authorship ==
The first sūtra in the Sthānānga goes as follows: sūyam me āusam tenam Bhagavayā evam akkhāyam – "I have heard, o Long-Lived one, that the Venerable (i.e. Mahāvīra) has said thus." From this it can be gauged that as per the tradition it was recited by ganadhara Sudharman, the fifth direct disciple of Mahāvīra, to his disciple Jambūsvāmin.

== Contribution to Indian Mathematics ==
Sthananga Sutra lists the topics which made up the mathematics studied from the time of 2nd century BCE onwards. In fact this list of topics sets the scene for the areas of study for a long time to come in the Indian subcontinent. The topics are listed in as: the theory of numbers, arithmetical operations, geometry, operations with fractions, simple equations, cubic equations, quartic equations, and permutations and combinations. It also gives classifications of five types of infinities.

The topics of mathematics, according to the Sthananga-sutra (sutra 747) are ten in numbers:

- Parikarma (four fundamental operations)
- Vyavahara (subjects of treatment)
- Rajju (geometry)
- Rashi (mensuration of solid bodies)
- Kalasavarna (fractions)
- Yavat-tavat (simple equation)
- Varga (quadratic equation)
- Ghana (cubic equation)
- Varga-varga (biquadratic equation)
- Vikalpa (permutation and combination)

However, the historians of mathematics differ in explaining some of the terms from the commentator, Abhayadeva Suri (1050 AD).

== English translations ==
Popular English translations are:

- Illustrated Sthananga Sutram in two volumes, (Prakrit–Hindi–English), Ed. by Pravartaka Amar Muni, Eng. tr. by Surendra Bothra
