= Ganadhara =

Disciples of Jain Tirthankara

Gandhara Pundrika the First Disciple of Rishabhanatha
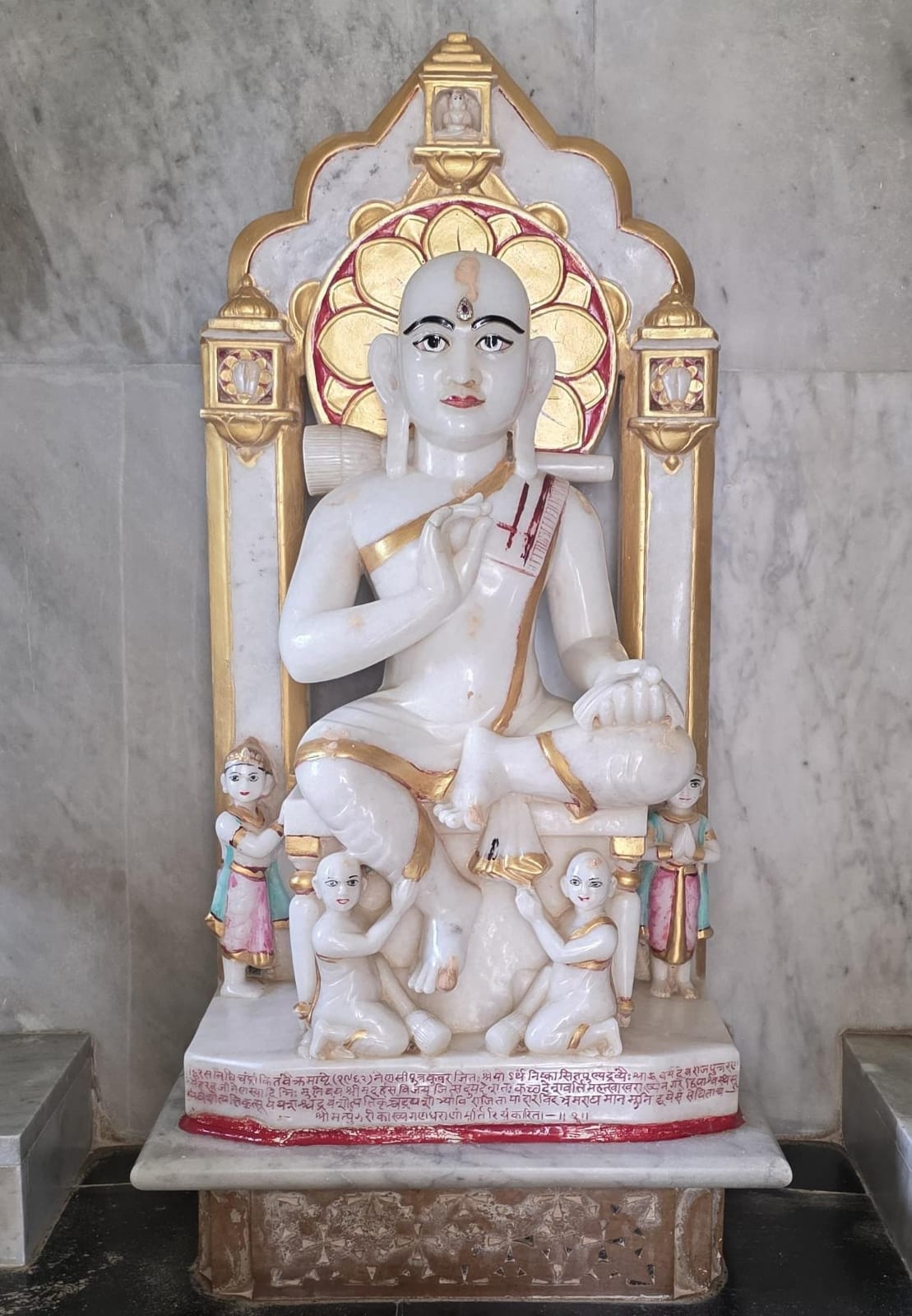

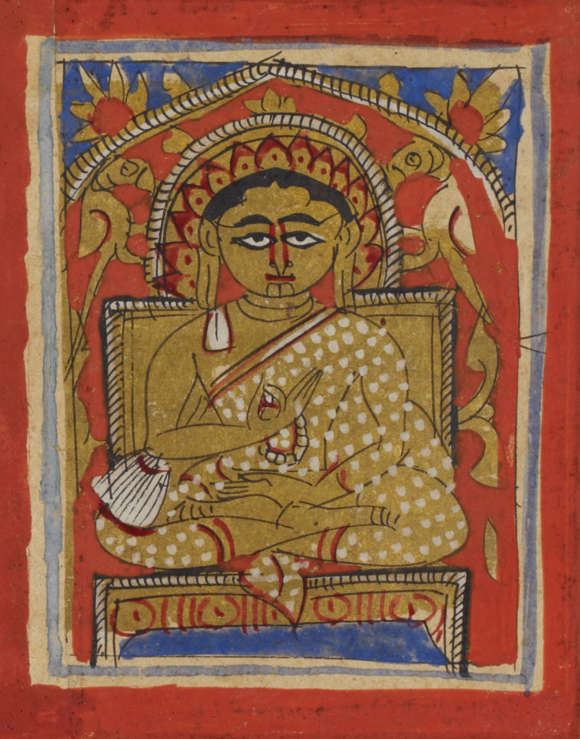
Indrabhuti Gautama ganadhara of Mahavira painting from Śrīpāla-kathā, 15th century

In Jainism, the term Ganadhara is used to refer the chief disciple of a Tirthankara. In samavasarana, the Tīrthankara sat on a throne without touching it (about two inches above it). Around, the Tīrthankara sits the Ganadharas. According to Digambara tradition, only a disciple of exceptional brilliance and accomplishment (riddhi) is able to fully assimilate, without doubt, delusion, or misapprehension, the anekanta teachings of a Tirthankara. The presence of such a disciple is mandatory in the samavasarana before Tirthankara delivers his sermons. Ganadhara interpret and mediate to other people the divine sound (divyadhwani) which the Jains claim emanates from Tirthankara's body when he preaches.

The monastic sangha of Jainism is divided into a number of orders or troupes called ganas, each headed by a ganadhara.

In 20th century, statues depicting Tīrthankaras and Ganadharas were unearthed in Mayurbhanj district of Odisha.

== List of the Ganadhara of 24 Tīrthankara ==
No.	Tīrthankara	Count	Famous Ganadhara
1	Rishabhanatha (Adinatha)	84	Vrishabha Sen, Kachha, Maha Kachha, Nami, Vinami
23	Parshvanatha	8	Kesi, Subhadatta, Aryaghoṣa, Vashishtha, Brahmachari, Soma, Sridhara, Virabhadra and Yasas
24	Mahavira	11	Indrabhuti Gautama, Agnibhuti, Vayubhuti, Sudharmaswami, Vyakta, Mandikata Mauryaputra, Akampita, Acalabharata, Metarya and Prabhasa

== Ganadhara Vrisabha Sen ==
Vrishabha Sen was the Ganadhara of Tīrthankara Rishabhanatha. According to Jain legends, after the nirvana of Rishabhanatha, Bharata was in grief. Ganadhara Vrisabha Sen saw him and spoke to him:

"Surely, this is not an occasion for grief, for the Lord has gone to the everlasting Abode of the Immortals, which you and I even are also going to reach very soon!

After this, Bharata recollected himself, touched the feet of Ganadhara Vrisabha Sen and left for his kingdom.

== Sources ==
- Jain, Vijay K. (2012), Acharya Amritchandra's Purushartha Siddhyupaya, Vikalp Printers, ISBN 9788190363945, "Non-copyright"
- Jain, Champat Rai (2008), Risabha Deva (Second ed.), India: Bhagwan Rishabhdeo Granth Mala, ISBN 9788177720228
- Dundas, Paul (2002) [1992], The Jains (Second ed.), Routledge, ISBN 0-415-26605-X
- Shah, Natubhai (2004) [First published in 1998], Jainism: The World of Conquerors, vol. I, Motilal Banarsidass, ISBN 978-81-208-1938-2
