= Śvetāmbara =

One of the two major schools of Jainism

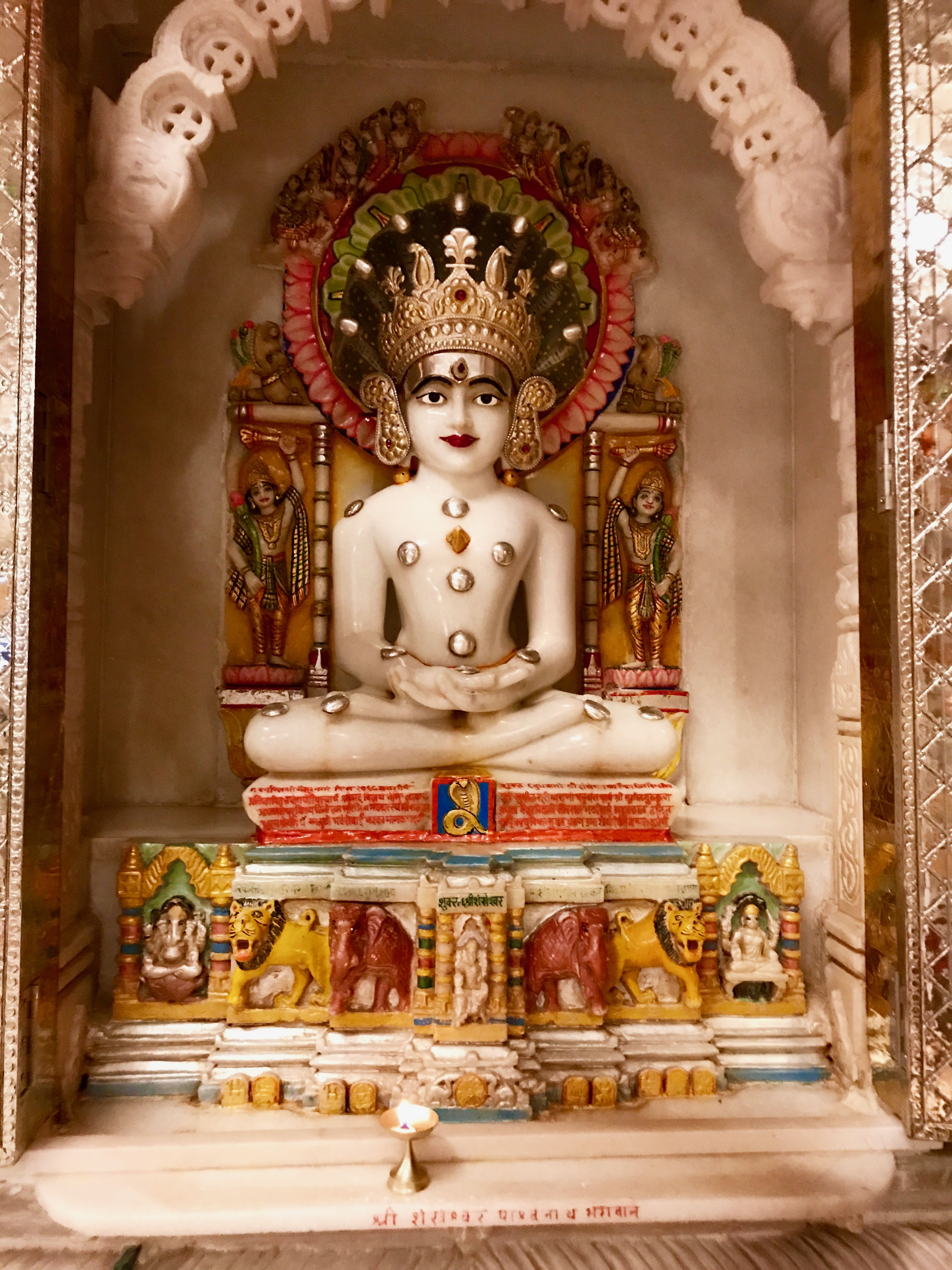
An idol of the 23rd tirthankara Parshvanatha at a Jain temple in Mysore, depicting Śvetāmbara iconography

The Śvetāmbara (/ʃwɛˈtʌmbərə/; also spelled Shwetambara, Shvetambara, Svetambara or Swetambara) is one of the two main branches of Jainism, the other being the Digambara. Śvetāmbara in Sanskrit means "white-clad", and refers to its ascetics' practice of wearing white clothes, which sets it apart from the Digambara or "sky-clad" Jains whose ascetic practitioners go nude. Śvetāmbaras do not believe that ascetics must practice nudity.

The Śvetāmbara and Digambara traditions have had historical differences ranging from their dress code, their temples and iconography, attitude towards Jain nuns, their legends and the texts they consider as important. Śvetāmbara Jain communities are currently found mainly in Gujarat, Rajasthan and coastal regions of Maharashtra. According to Jeffery D. Long, a scholar of Hindu and Jain studies, about four-fifths of all Jains in India are Śvetāmbaras.

== History and lineage ==
Śvetāmbaras consider themselves to be the original followers of Mahavira and believe that the Digambara sect emerged in 82 AD as a result of a rebellion by a monk named Sivabhuti, who was the disciple of Arya Krishnasuri. This account is found in 5th century Śvetāmbara text Viśeśāvaśyaka Bhaśya written by Jinabhadra. This is also the earliest formal recognition of the schism between the two sects.

Śvetāmbaras have several pattavalis that mention the historical lineage of their chief monks (acharya) beginning with the 24th Tirthankara Mahavira. The most popular of the pattavalis is the one mentioned in the Kalpa Sūtra, a canonical scripture of the Śvetāmbaras. According to the lineage mentioned in the Kalpa Sūtra, Sthulabhadra was, unequivocally, the successor of Bhadrabāhu. Śvetāmbaras also believe that both of them were white-clad monks. These beliefs are completely rejected by the Digambara sect.

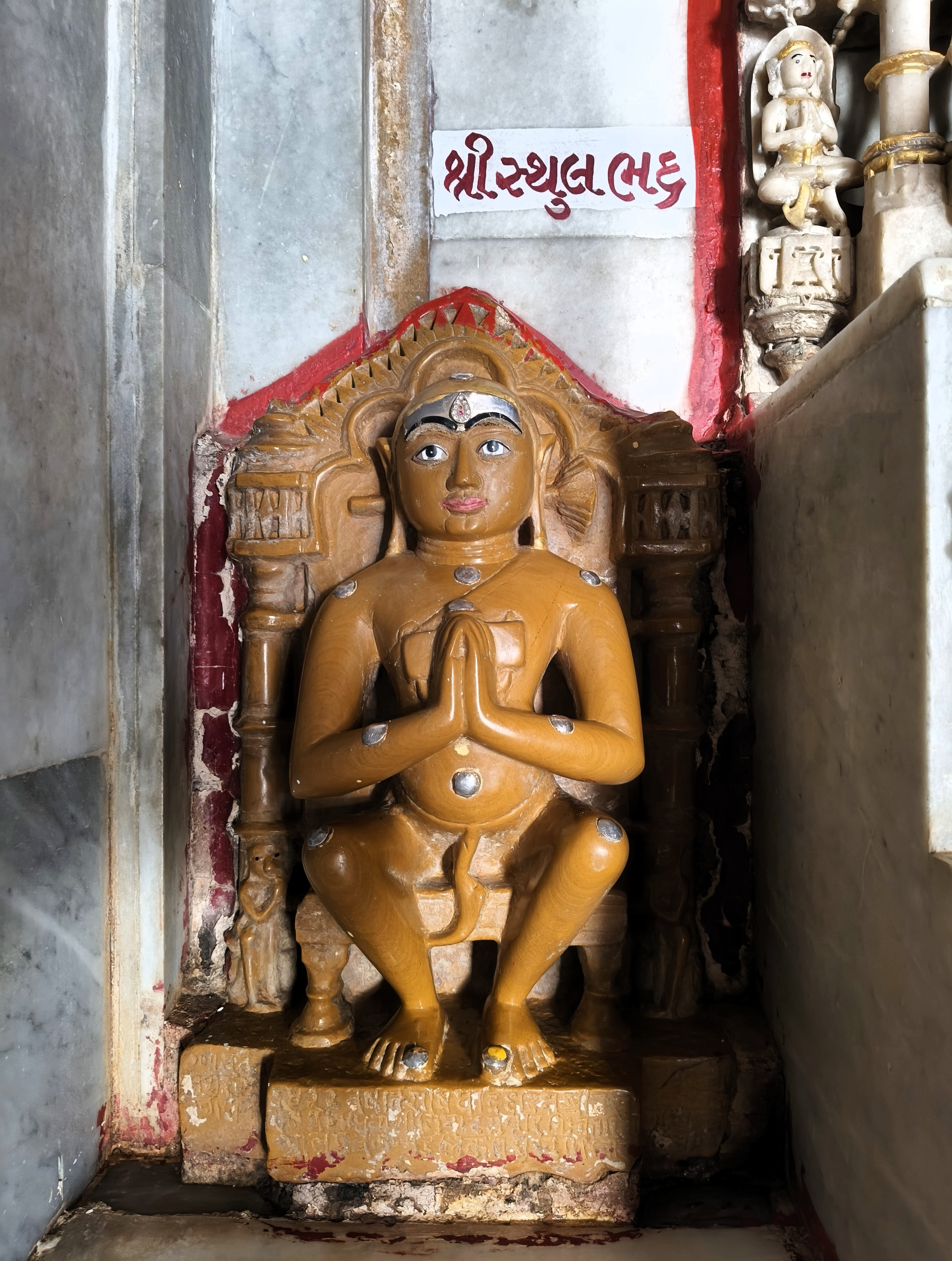
14th century Ārya Sthūlabhadra idol at the Khaḍākhoṭadī no Pāḍo Jaina Temple at Patan

To manage the large following of the murtipujaka sect, Gacchas (administrative sub-divisions) were created. Each gaccha has its own pattavali. One of the 84 gacchas was the Upkeśa Gaccha. While all other pattavalis (including the one mentioned in the Kalpa Sūtra) trace their lineage to the 24th Tirthankara Mahavira, Upkesa Gaccha's pattavali traces its lineage to the 23rd Tirthankara Parshvanatha. Kesiswami, one of Parshvanatha's chief disciples, Acharya Ratnaprabhasuri, the founder of the Oswal community as well as Acharya Swayamprabhasuri, the founder of the Porwal community belonged to this gaccha. It was in existence until 1930s when it went extinct.

A majority of the Śvetāmbaras are murtipujakas, that is they actively offer devotional puja in temples, worship before the images or idols of Tirthankaras and important Jain demi-gods and demi-goddesses. Historically, this is the oldest sub-tradition of the Śvetāmbaras and all other aniconic sects have emerged in and after the 14th century.

The Śvetāmbara murtipujaka (idol-worshipping) sect is the largest of all sects and sub-sects of Jainism and has the most number of followers and monks. To manage the large following, gacchas (administrative sub-divisions) were created. 84 gacchas have come into existence till date and most of them are extinct now. Only 4 survive today - Tapa Gaccha, Kharatara Gaccha, Parshvachandra Gaccha, and Achal Gaccha. Of these, Tapa Gaccha is the largest, with the most monks and followers.

The murtipujaka sect has had various eminent monks, including, but not limited to Vimalsuri, Hemachandra, Hiravijaya, Devardhigani Kshamashraman, Yashovijaya, Anandghan, Siddhasena, and Manatunga.

== Scriptures and literature ==
Śvetāmbara literature can be classified into two major categories — canonical and non-canonical. Canonical scriptures state the Jain cosmology and the Jain philosophy as well as the foundational aspects of understanding Jainism. They also govern the conduct of monks, nuns, as well as the laity. Non-canonical scriptures include, but are not limited to commentaries on canonical scriptures, biographies of the Śalākāpuruṣas (as in Hemachandra's Trisasti-shalakapurusa-caritra), Jain mythology, treatise and extensions of the canonical scriptures, lists of rare and uncommon words and knowledge base and dictionaries for Ardhamagadhi Prakrit, Maharashtri Prakrit, and Sanskrit, devotional hymns (stavan, stuti, sajjhay, or mantra), and miscellaneous scriptures.

=== Āgamas or canonical literature ===
The Śvetāmbara canon consists of 45 scriptures, mostly written in Ardhamagadhi Prakrit. They are considered to be what is left of Mahavira's teachings. Historically, the knowledge of these scriptures was passed down orally in a preceptor-disciple system (guru-shishya parampara). However, the memory of the monks weakened in the 12-year long famine as described in the Kalpa Sūtra. As a result, most of the knowledge of the canonical scriptures was lost. The remaining canon was codified at the Great Council of Vallabhi under leadership of Devardhigani Kshamashramana, which was held at Vallabhi in 454 CE resulting in the 45 scriptures that govern the Śvetāmbara sect's religious practices till date.

From a linguistic point of view, Śvetāmbara canonical scriptures are the oldest of all Jain literature. The Ācārāṅga Sūtra, Uttaradhyayana Sutra, and the Sthananga Sutra of the Śvetāmbara canon are considered to have been created in 5th–4th century BC. Following is a list of the 45 canonical scriptures followed by the Śvetāmbaras:

- Twelve Angās (limbs)
  - Āyāraṃga (Jain Prakrit; Sanskrit: Ācāranga, meaning: 'On monastic conduct')
  - Sūyagaḍa (Sūtrakṛtāṅga, 'On heretical systems and views')
  - Ṭhāṇaṃga (Sthānāṅga, 'On different points [of the teaching]')
  - Samavāyaṃga (Samavāyāṅga, 'On "rising numerical groups"')
  - Viyāha-pannatti / Bhagavaī (Vyākhyā-prajñapti or Bhagavatī, 'Exposition of explanations' or 'the holy one')
  - Nāyā-dhamma-kahāo (Jñāta-dharmakathānga, 'Parables and religious stories')
  - Uvāsaga-dasāo (Upāsaka-daśāḥ, 'Ten chapters on the Jain lay follower')
  - Aṇuttarovavāiya-dasāo (Antakṛd-daśāḥ, 'Ten chapters on those who put an end to rebirth in this very life')
  - Anuttaraupapātikadaśāh (Anuttaropapātika-daśāḥ, 'Ten chapters on those who were reborn in the uppermost heavens')
  - Paṇha-vāgaraṇa (Praśna-vyākaraṇa, 'Questions and explanations')
  - Vivāga-suya (Vipākaśruta, 'Bad or good results of deeds performed')
  - Drstivada (Driśtivāda, 'contained the 14 purvas and is considered lost now')
- Twelve Upāṅgas (auxiliary limbs)
  - Uvavāiya-sutta (Sanskrit: Aupapātika-sūtra, 'Places of rebirth')
  - Rāya-paseṇaijja or Rāyapaseṇiya (Rāja-praśnīya, 'Questions of the king')
  - Jīvājīvābhigama (Jīvājīvābhigama, 'Classification of animate and inanimate entities')
  - Pannavaṇā (Prajñāpanā, 'Enunciation on topics of philosophy and ethics')
  - Sūriya-pannatti (Sūrya-prajñapti, 'Exposition on the sun')
  - Jambūdvīpa-pannatti (Jambūdvīpa-prajñapti, 'Exposition on the Jambū continent and the Jain universe')
  - Canda-pannatti (Candra-prajñapti, 'Exposition on the moon and the Jain universe')
  - Nirayāvaliyāo or Kappiya (Narakāvalikā, 'Series of stories on characters reborn in hells')
  - Kappāvaḍaṃsiāo (Kalpāvataṃsikāḥ, 'Series of stories on characters reborn in the kalpa heavens')
  - Pupphiāo (Puṣpikāḥ, 'Flowers' refers to one of the stories')
  - Puppha-cūliāo (Puṣpa-cūlikāḥ, 'The nun Puṣpacūlā')
  - Vaṇhi-dasāo (Vṛṣṇi-daśāh, 'Stories on characters from the legendary dynasty known as Andhaka-Vṛṣṇi')
- Six Chedasūtras (Texts relating to the conduct and behaviour of monks and nuns)
  - Āyāra-dasāo (Sanskrit: Ācāradaśāh, 'Ten [chapters] about monastic conduct', chapter 8 is the famed Kalpa-sūtra.)
  - Bihā Kappa (Bṛhat Kalpa, '[Great] Religious code')
  - Vavahāra (Vyavahāra, 'Procedure')
  - Nisīha (Niśītha, 'Interdictions')
  - Jīya-kappa (Jīta-kalpa, Customary rules), only accepted as canonical by Mūrti-pūjakas
  - Mahā-nisīha (Mahā-niśītha, Large Niśītha), only accepted as canonical by Mūrti-pūjakas
- Four Mūlasūtras ('Fundamental texts' which are foundational works studied by new monastics)
  - Dasaveyāliya-sutta (Sanskrit: Daśavaikālika-sūtra): this is memorized by all new Jain mendicants
  - Uttarajjhayaṇa-sutta (Uttarādhyayana-sūtra)
  - Āvassaya-sutta (Āvaśyaka-sūtra)
  - Piṇḍa-nijjutti and Ogha-nijjutti (Piṇḍa-niryukti and Ogha-niryukti), only accepted as canonical by Mūrti-pūjakas
- Two Cūlikasūtras ("appendixes")
  - Nandī-sūtra – discusses the five types of knowledge
  - Anuyogadvāra-sūtra – a technical treatise on analytical methods, discusses Anekantavada
- Ten Paiṇṇayasūtras ("miscellaneous texts")
  - Cau-saraṇa (Sanskrit: Catuḥśaraṇa, The 'four refuges')
  - Āura-paccakkhāṇa (Ātura-pratyākhyāna, 'Sick man's renunciation')
  - Bhatta-parinnā (Bhakta-parijñā, 'Renunciation of food')
  - Saṃthāraga (Saṃstāraka, 'Straw bed')
  - Tandula-veyāliya (Taṇḍula-vaicārika, 'Reflection on rice grains')
  - Canda-vejjhaya (Candravedhyaka, 'Hitting the mark')
  - Devinda-tthaya (Devendra-stava, 'Praise of the kings of gods')
  - Gaṇi-vijjā (Gaṇi-vidyā, 'A Gaṇi's knowledge')
  - Mahā-paccakkhāṇa (Mahā-pratyākhyāna, 'Great renunciation')
  - Vīra-tthava (Vīra-stava, 'Great renunciation')

The above list makes it 46, but the last angā Driśtivāda is considered to be lost by both the sects. It was this scripture that contained the 14 purvas (14 scriptures containing extensive knowledge) of Jainism.

=== Non-canonical literature ===
All texts or pieces of literature written by Śvetāmbara monks, except the ones stated above are considered to be non-canonical in nature. Following are some popular examples. However, the complete list is inexhaustive as the Śvetāmbara sect has always had more monks than the Digambara sect:

- Commentaries on canonical scriptures:
  - Hemachandra's Yogaśāstra
  - Haribhadra's Yogadṛṣṭisamuccaya
  - Yashovijaya's Gyānsār
  - Jinabhadra's Viśeśāvaśyaka Bhaśya
- Biographies of Śalākāpuruṣas and other monks
  - Hemachandra's Trīṣaṣṭiśalākāpuruṣacharitra (biographies of the lives of 63 illustrious men)
  - Hemachandra's Pariśiṣṭaparvan
  - Vimalsuri's Paumachariyam (oldest of all Jain versions of Ramayana)
- Devotional hymns
  - Manatunga's Bhaktāmara Stotra
  - Siddhasena's Kalyān Mandir Stotra
  - Siddhasena's Vardhamān Śakrastav Stotra
  - Hemachandra's Sakalārhat Stotra
- Treatise on languages and grammar
  - Rajendrasuri's 7-part Abhidhānarājaindrakōśa
  - Hemachandra's Siddha-Hema-Śabdanuśāśana
  - Hemachandra's Tattvaprakāśikā prakāś (the grammar of the old Gujarati language)
  - Hemachandra's Abhidhāna-cintāmaṇi-kośa
  - Hemachandra's Anekarth Kośa
  - Hemachandra's Deśi-Śabda-Sangraho

== Religious practices ==
=== The Chaturvidha Sangha ===
There are vast differences between the practices of the Śvetāmbaras and the Digambaras with some fundamental overlaps. Śvetāmbara scriptures divide the Jain Sangha into four parts and the congregation is popularly known as the chaturvidha sangha (a sangha comprising four parts). The four parts are — monks, nuns, male lay followers (also known as śrāvakas), and female lay followers (also known as śrāvikās). Religious practices of the Śvetāmbara sect differ for each section (monastics and laity) of the sangha.

=== Monasticism ===
==== Preparing for initiation ====
Right before initiation, an ascetic-to-be performs his/her final puja of the Tirthankara idols. Monks and nuns are not permitted to perform puja of the idols because they are not permitted to bathe all their life and Śvetāmbara scriptures only permit a person with clean body and after bathing may perform puja of the idols. Ceremonious donation of all world possessions is performed before initiation.

==== Initiation ====
Upon initiation, a monk or a nun renounces all worldly possessions and relations, takes the Five Vows and pulls his/her hair out. A newly-initiated monk/nun is ceremoniously given the rajoharan by their preceptor (who is always only an acharya). Unlike as in the Digambara sect where monks and nuns are not forbidden from touching each other and lay-followers of the opposite gender, monks and nuns of the Śvetāmbara sect do not touch persons of the opposite gender (neither mendicants nor lay-followers of the opposite gender) and observe extreme celibacy all their life.

==== Monastic possessions (āvaśyakas) ====
Monks and nuns of the Śvetāmbara sect wear white seamless clothing and carry a rajoharan (woolen broom to clear their path of insects and small creatures), an alms bowl, a long stick, and scriptures. All monks and nuns possess only these objects. Additionally, they may only take what is given to them and what comes under permitted possessions (the objects listed earlier). They are not permitted to take anything that is not given to them by the owner of the said object.

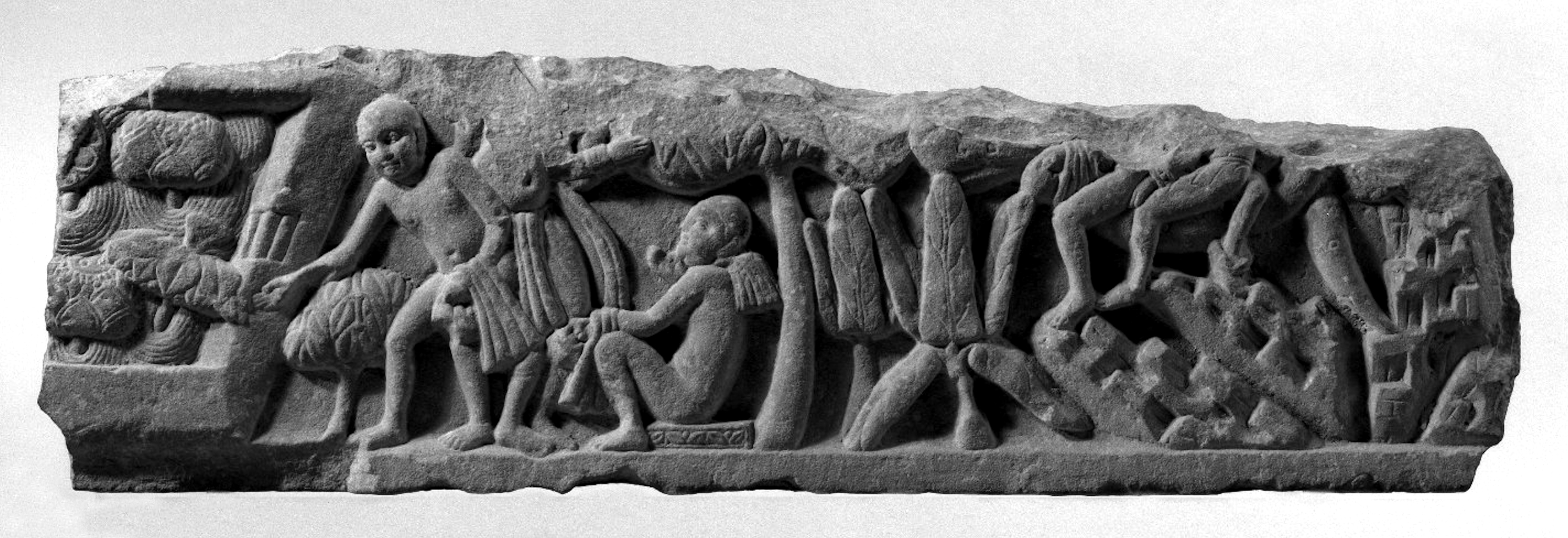
A 1st- to 2nd–century CE water tank relief panel showing two ardhaphalaka Jain monks carrying colapatta cloth on their left hand found in the ruins of Mathura (Brooklyn Museum 87.188.5). This cloth carrying tradition to cover genitalia by ancient Jain monks in principle resembles the beliefs of the Śvetāmbara and now extinct Yapaniya subtradition.

==== Begging for alms ====
Unlike ascetics of the Digambara sect, ascetics of the Śvetāmbara sect beg for alms from multiple households as the Ācārāṅga Sūtra describes how begging for alms for an entire meal from a single household does not fall under fault-free food that Jain monks must consume as it might aggrieve the householder they accept food from. Becoming the medium for a householder's grievance is unacceptable as per a mendicant's conduct. 42 faults of food are described which a monk or a nun must assess before accepting it as alms. They may only consume food free from the 42 faults (as described in the Ācārāṅga Sūtra) and boiled water between the period from 48 minutes after sunrise and until 48 minutes before sunset. However, monks and nuns of the Śvetāmbara sect actively perform and promote and inspire the laity to perform fasting to obtain control over the senses.

==== Wandering ====
Mendicants constantly wander for 8 months of a year (except the 4 months of the chaturmasya) on foot. The reason mendicants must wander is to regulate their senses of possession and to spread the word of Jainism. The Ācārāṅga Sūtra describes that for a mendicant, staying at one place for a period extending more than 1 month is not permitted. The reason for that is to regulate possession. A mendicant staying at one place for longer periods of time might begin getting attached to the place and such attachments must be avoided and if developed, given up. However, during the 4 months of the chaturmasya, rains are expected and there is an increase in the number of insects on ground. Mendicants must not step on insects to practice ahimsa and therefore, they are required to stay at one place for those 4 months. Stepping on grass and on water or wet ground is not permitted due to their tendency to have life. Most mendicants give religious sermons and spread the word of Jainism wherever they wander. Usually, nowadays, several Jain temples have spaces that are used for general purposes that mendicants may use after obtaining permission from the temple management. This is particularly important as if the space was constructed for the purpose of housing mendicants, even temporarily, it becomes unfit for use by mendicants. That is because it no longer remains 'free of faults' since mendicants become a medium of violence as well as possession here. This is discussed in the Ācārāṅga Sūtra at length.

==== Classes of monks ====
Monks of the Śvetāmbara sect are categorized among the classes as described in the Namokar Mantra. Each newly initiated monk is a sadhu (the fifth class as described in the fifth line of the Namokar Mantra). After attaining sufficient spiritual and scriptural knowledge along with experience of the monastic life, a sadhu may be promoted to the status of an upadhyaya (the fourth class as described in the fourth line of the Namokar Mantra). Finally, after sufficient spiritual education, a monk is promoted to the status of an acharya.

Acharyas are spiritual heads of the said monastic order. Usually each of the 4 gacchas has a spiritual preceptor of the highest order and who is referred to as the gacchadhipati of the said gaccha. A gacchadhipati is an acharya. Each of Kharata Gaccha, Achal Gaccha, and Parshvachandra Gaccha have one gacchadhipati each. However, Tapa Gaccha has 21 gacchadhipatis as it is further sub-divided into various samudaays (smaller sections of a gaccha). Some of the major samudaays of the Tapa Gaccha are - Buddhisagarsuri Samudaay, Sagaranand (or Anandsagar) Samudaay, Kalapurnasuri Samudaay, Bhuvanbhanusuri Samudaay etc. Another class of monks is ganivarya who are spiritual heads of a small sub-section of monks in a samudaay. Other classes of monks such as panyaas and upapanyaas also exist.

==== Other duties ====
Śvetāmbara monks also perform other miscellaneous functions and duties. Some of them are as described below:

- Writing non-canonical scriptures (including commentaries on canonical scriptures) such as Hemachandra's Yogaśāstra, Haribhadra's Yogadṛṣṭisamuccaya, Yashovijaya's Gyānsār Jinabhadra's Viśeśāvaśyaka Bhaśya.
- Writing devotional songs (stavans, stutis, sajjhays etc.), such as Anandghan's Chouvisi, Manatunga's Bhaktāmara Stotra, Siddhasena's Kalyan Mandir Stotra and Vardhamān Śakrastav Stotra, Hemachandra's Sakalarhat Stotra etc.
- Actively promoting principles of Jainism among the laity through religious sermons.
- Administering vows to the laity, such as the laity's 12 vows.
- Accepting confessions from and giving tasks to make up for their sins to the laity (alochana or prāyaścitta).
- Acharyas perform consecration of temple lands and idols in a ritual known as anjana-śalākā.
- Training the lay followers who seek initiation in the near future.
- Regularly performing Pratikramana.

=== Laity ===
The Śvetāmbara canon defines some guidelines and duties for lay followers (śrāvakas and śrāvikās) of Jainism to fulfill. Some of them are summarized as follows: -

==== 12 vrats (vows) of householders ====
Scriptures describe 12 vows that a householder must take in order to bind minimum karma. These 12 vows are also taken by lay followers of the Digambara sect as well as the aniconic offshoots of the Śvetāmbara sect. They are one of the very few points that both the sects agree upon. They summarize almost all duties a householder must perform as part of the Jain sangha. They are classified into 3 categories. Following is a list of the 12 vows of a householder:

- 5 Aṇuvratas
  1. Sthūla Prāṇātipāta Viramaṇ Vrat: A toned-down version of the Ahimsa Mahāvrat followed by the mendicants. Minimal and unavoidable violence is acceptable on householders' part and they are not required to follow ahimsa (non-violence) as mendicants follow.
  2. Sthūla Mṛṣāvāda Viramaṇ Vrat: This is a toned-down version of the Satya Mahāvrat followed by the mendicants. Householders are directed to avoid speaking lies.
  3. Sthūla Adattādāna Viramaṇ Vrat: This is a milder form of the Achaurya Mahāvrat followed by monks and nuns. Householders are discouraged from stealing anything that is not theirs or is not given to them.
  4. Sthūla Maithuna Viramaṇ Vrat: This is a toned-down form of the Brahmacharya Mahāvrat taken by the mendicants. Householders are discouraged from engaging in adultery with anyone other than their partner for any purpose.
  5. Sthūla Parigrah Viramaṇ Vrat: This is a milder form of the mendicants' Aparigrah Mahāvrat. Householders are discouraged from holding assets more than their requirement and needs. Being too deeply involved in worldly and materialistic pleasures is a hindrance to the attainment of moksha.
- 3 Guṇavratas
  1. Sthūla Dik Parimāṇa Vrat: This vow is taken to reduce the movement in each direction by setting a specific limit. This is done to ensure minimum traveling is performed, leading to lesser karma being bound to the soul.
  2. Sthūla Bhogopabhoga Viramaṇ Vrat: This vow is taken to reduce the usage of materialistic objects to a set limit. By taking this vow, a lay follower can reduce their attachment to materialistic objects.
  3. Sthūla Anarthadaṇḍa Viramaṇ Vrat: This vow is taken to completely give up useless and fruitless activities. Any action which is performed without a reason constitutes to a sin. Therefore, this vow directs a lay-follower to reduce/stop performing useless actions and activities.
- 4 Śikṣāvratas
  1. Sāmāyika Vrat: This vow can either be given by a mendicant, or a lay-person who has already taken the vow or, can be self-taken. It lasts 48 minutes and lay followers are encouraged to study scriptures and improve their knowledge of the religion in this time. For these 48 minutes, a lay follower becomes just like a mendicant and must follow the Five Vows just like they do. One who takes this vow detaches themself from the worldly activities and embraces equanimity for 48 minutes at once. In loose terms, equanimity (indifference to the positives and negatives around one) is the ultimate goal of Jainism as it leads to no karma being bound to the soul.
  2. Deśāvakāśika Vrat: This vow entails the completion of 2 pratikramanas and 8 sāmāyikas.
  3. Pauṣadha Vrat: This vow is taken for a specific period of time and is given by a mendicant only. During this time, the lay follower becomes equivalent to a mendicant and must practice the Five Vows just like they do. The follower must also beg for alms and follow all rule, rites, and rituals a mendicant follows.
  4. Atithi Saṃvibhāga Vrat: This vow promotes charity among the lay followers in that they are encouraged to donate their belongings to monks, nuns, and other needy people. It is believed that this vow, if taken and followed seriously, leads to a reduction in attachment to the worldly and materialistic pleasures.

==== 6 āvaśyakas (essential observances) of householders ====
6 essential observances have been considered necessary for a lay follower to practice regularly in both the sects. However, the observances are different in each sect. Mendicants also observe these regularly and it is believed that these essential observances help one maintain discipline as well as bind least and shed most karma. Following are the 6 essential observances of śrāvakas and śrāvikās of the Śvetāmbara sect: -

1. Sāmāyika: This concept is considered to be so important that it occurs in the 12 vows as well as 6 essential observances. It has also been a subject of great discussion in the canonical scripture Uttaradhyayana Sutra. A lay follower embraces equanimity for 48 minutes and that is how purification of soul happens.
2. Chaturvimsati-stava: This refers to extolling and appreciating the qualities of and praying to tirthankaras as supreme beings for purification of soul. Through this, a lay follower attains the ratnatraya and eventual samyaktva (true and right knowledge, belief, and conduct). Śvetāmbara canon defines the Logassa Sutra and Namutthunam Sutra to extol the qualities of the 24 tirthankaras. It is written in Ardhamagadhi Prakrit.
3. Vandanā: This refers to the practice of showing obeisance towards one's preceptor mendicant (monk/nun). It also means one should surrender themself to their guru and accept their word as it is. Performing service of one's preceptor and respecting them is one of the prime duties of householders.
4. Pratikramana: Shedding of negative karma is the prime goal of Jainism and this practice directly lets one perform that. It entails performing penance and mindfully regretting and seeking forgiveness for one's wrong deeds. It consists of a long sequence of hymns, prayers, and rituals. The main goal is to seek forgiveness for one's negative actions. It includes the first, second, and the fifth Āvaśyakas as part of rituals within it.
5. Kāyotsarga: This practice is concerned with concentration on non-attachment. This may be performed in a standing or a sitting posture and during this time, the lay follower must not think of any attachments, including the body. As per the canonical scripture Sthananga Sutra, a lay follower goes into shukladhyan (pure meditation) during kayotsarga. Usually Chaturvimsati-stava Āvaśyaka through Logassa Sutra is performed during kayotsarga.
6. Pratyākhyāna: Last of all Āvaśyakas, it includes taking vows for and limiting all actions so as to perform minimal karma. A lay follower takes pratyākhyāna (vow) before commencing fasts. Similarly, a lay follower takes pratyākhyāna to limit intake of food and ay other materialistic things to have a better self-control. According to the 24th tirthankara Mahavira in the Uttaradhyayana Sutra, a follower's soul is purified by taking pratyākhyāna and renouncing certain actions and objects for a set period of time.

==== Jinpūjā and caityavandan (idol worship) ====
The Śvetāmbara canon unequivocally endorses the worshipping of idols of tirthankaras by all sections of the Chaturvidha Sangha. The main motive behind such worshipping is not a worldly affair, but worshipping their qualities. Most Śvetāmbara lay-followers perform worshipping of idols in three main formats:

- Aṅga Pūjā (worshipping by anointing various parts of the idol): Such worshipping is performed by anointing various parts of the idol using several objects of worship, including water, saffron mixed with sandalwood paste, Vāsakṣepa (sandalwood powder), Yakṣakardama (a fragrant ointment) etc. According to scriptures, such worshipping is performed only using 'uttam dravya' (excellent and possibly expensive objects of worship).
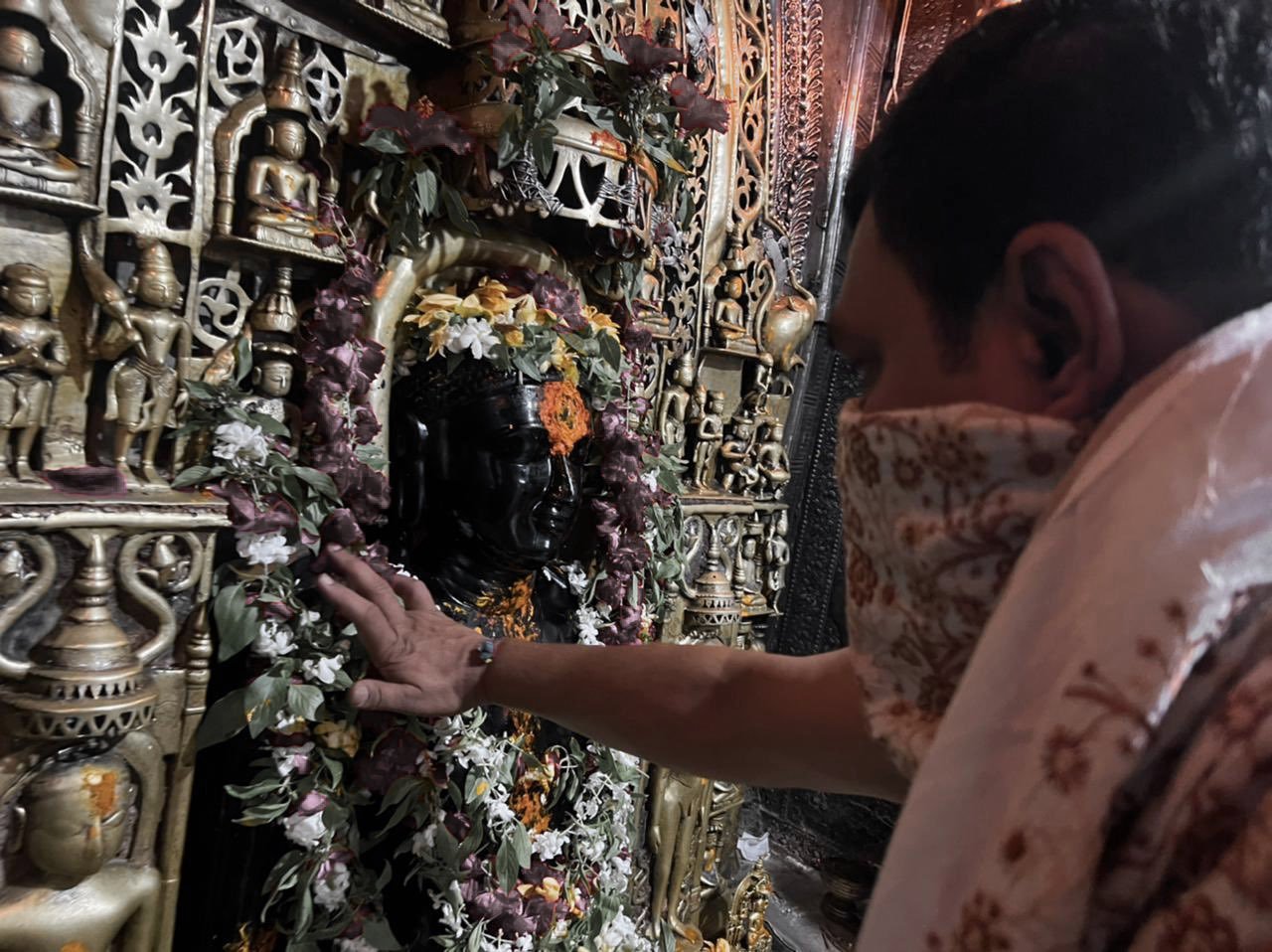
  A Śvetāmbara lay follower performing 'Anga Puja' of the idol of Kesariyaji by anointing the idol with saffron and sandalwood mixture as per ancient rituals of Kesariyaji temple and of the Śvetāmbara sect
  Mendicants are not allowed to perform worship using such objects as they do not own materialistic objects and have already renounced them. Also the violence that can be caused towards small creatures and beings during such worshipping is unacceptable according to a mendicant's conduct as described in the scriptures. Householders are not supposed to follow such micro levels of non-violence and must perform idol worship as it has more merits (extolling qualities of tirthankaras and eventually attaining such a state) than demerits as described in the canon. Another form of such worship is Aṅga Rachanā or Āṅgī, which refers to the devotional worshipping of the idol by decorating it with a devotedly designed armor of vibrant objects such as stones, clothes, and other colorful objects that are obtained by pure methods and sources.
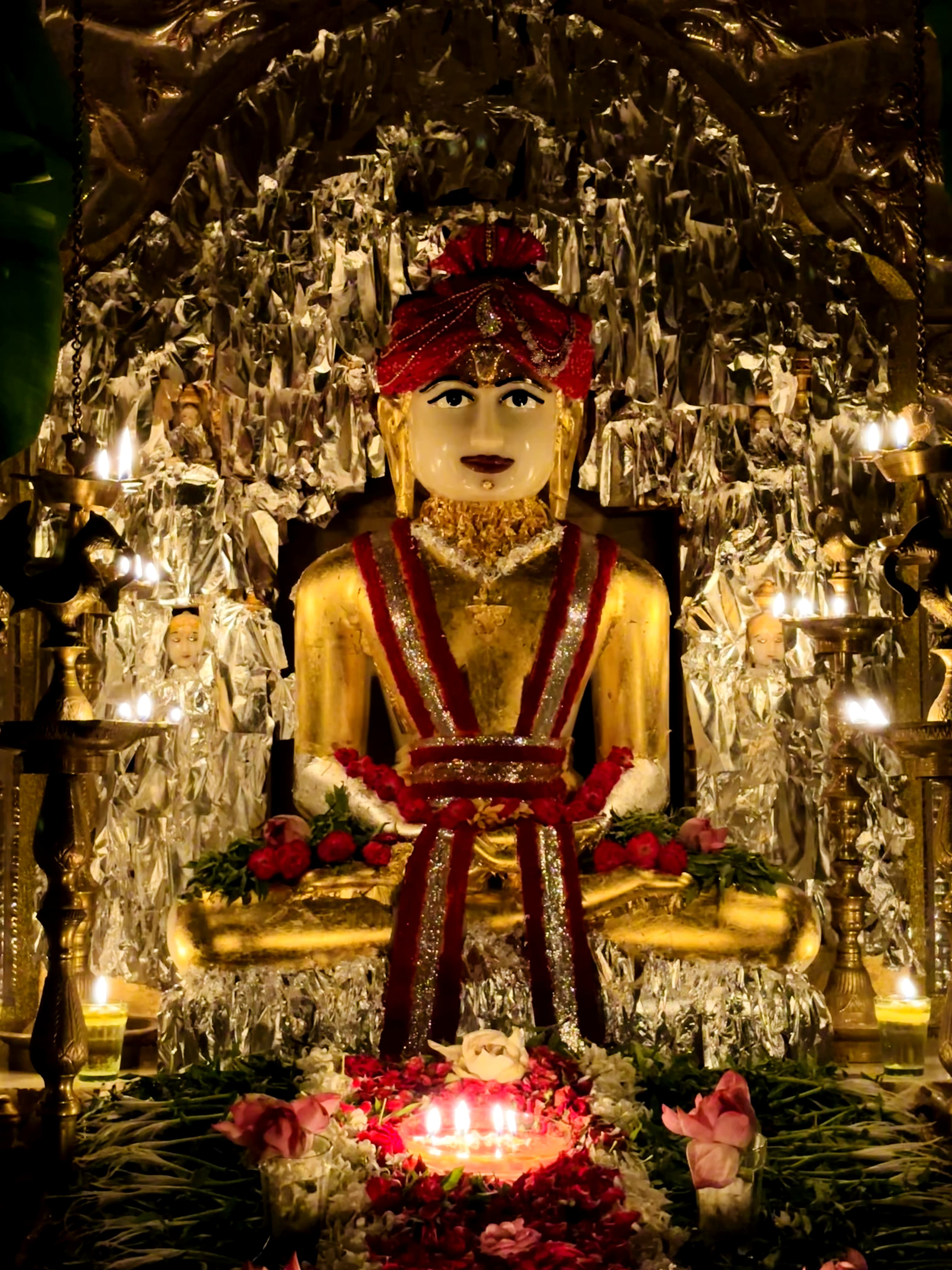
  Anga Rachana of an idol of Mahavira Swami, the 24th Tirthankara, using pure and non-violently prepared silver and gold foil. at Shri Mahavira Swami Jinalaya at Risala Bazar, Deesa
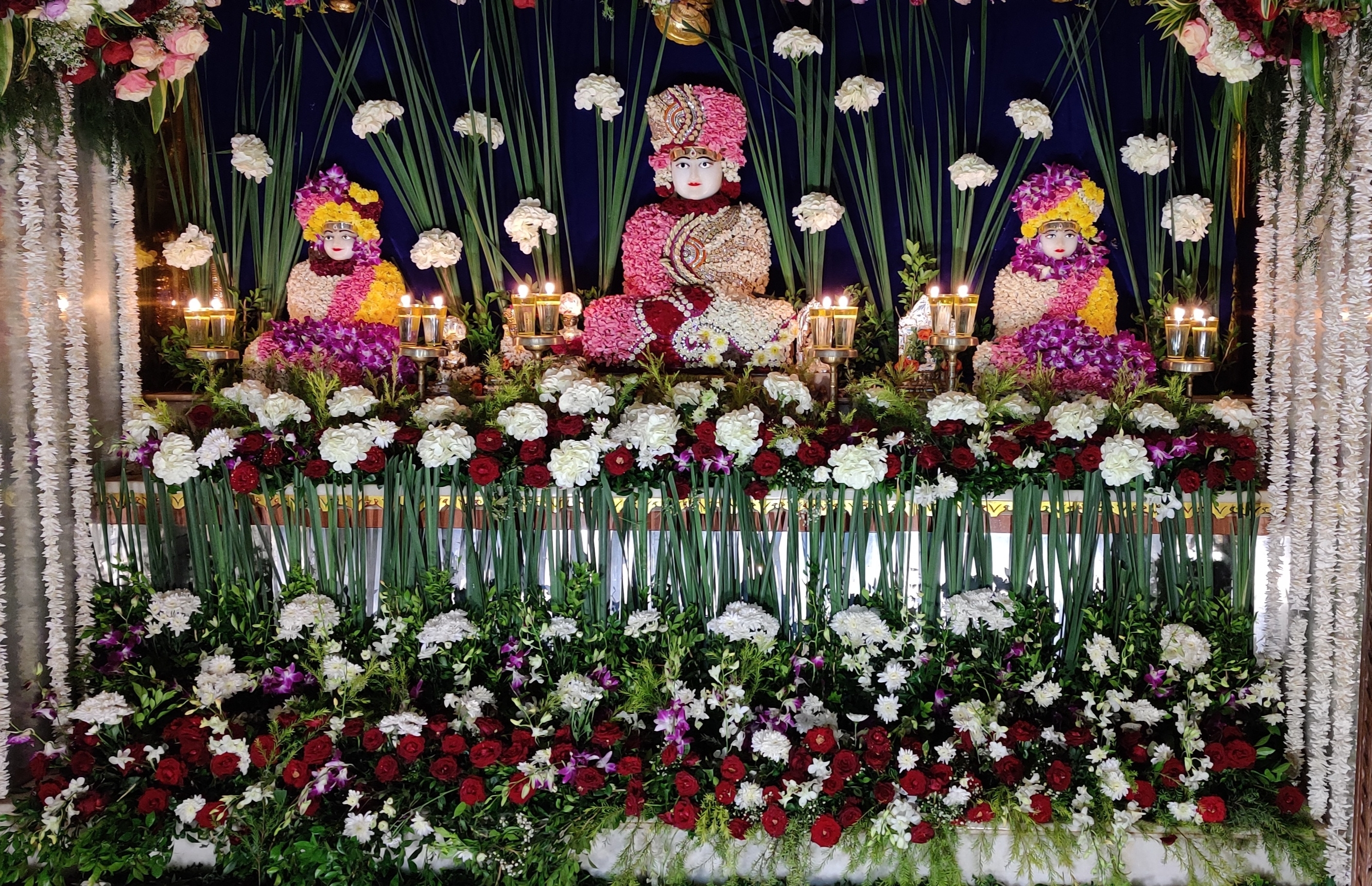
  Anga Rachana (decoration of Tirthankara idols with pure materials) using only pure flowers at Vasupujya Swami Derasar, Goregaon, Mumbai
- Agra Pūjā (worshipping of the idol without touching it): Such worship is performed by placing objects of worship in front of the idol and reciting Prakrit or Sanskrit prayers, or singing devotional hymns. Objects of worship include, Dhūp (incense), Dīpa (lamp), Akṣata (raw rice grains), Fal (fruits), and Naivedya (sweets). Each object of worshipping has its own significance and reason. These 5, in combination with Jal Pūjā (bathing the idol with water), Kesar Pūjā (worshipping with idol by anointing it with a mixture of sandalwood paste and saffron), and Kusum Pūjā (worshipping the idol by placing flower on its parts) are collectively known as Aṣṭaprakāri Pūjā. Mendicants cannot perform this form of worshipping as well as the material used for such worshipping can cause violence against small creatures and a mendicant must strictly follow the Five Vows of which non-violence is the first. However, householders may perform such worshipping as the vows they follow do not entail practicing such micro-level of non-violence.
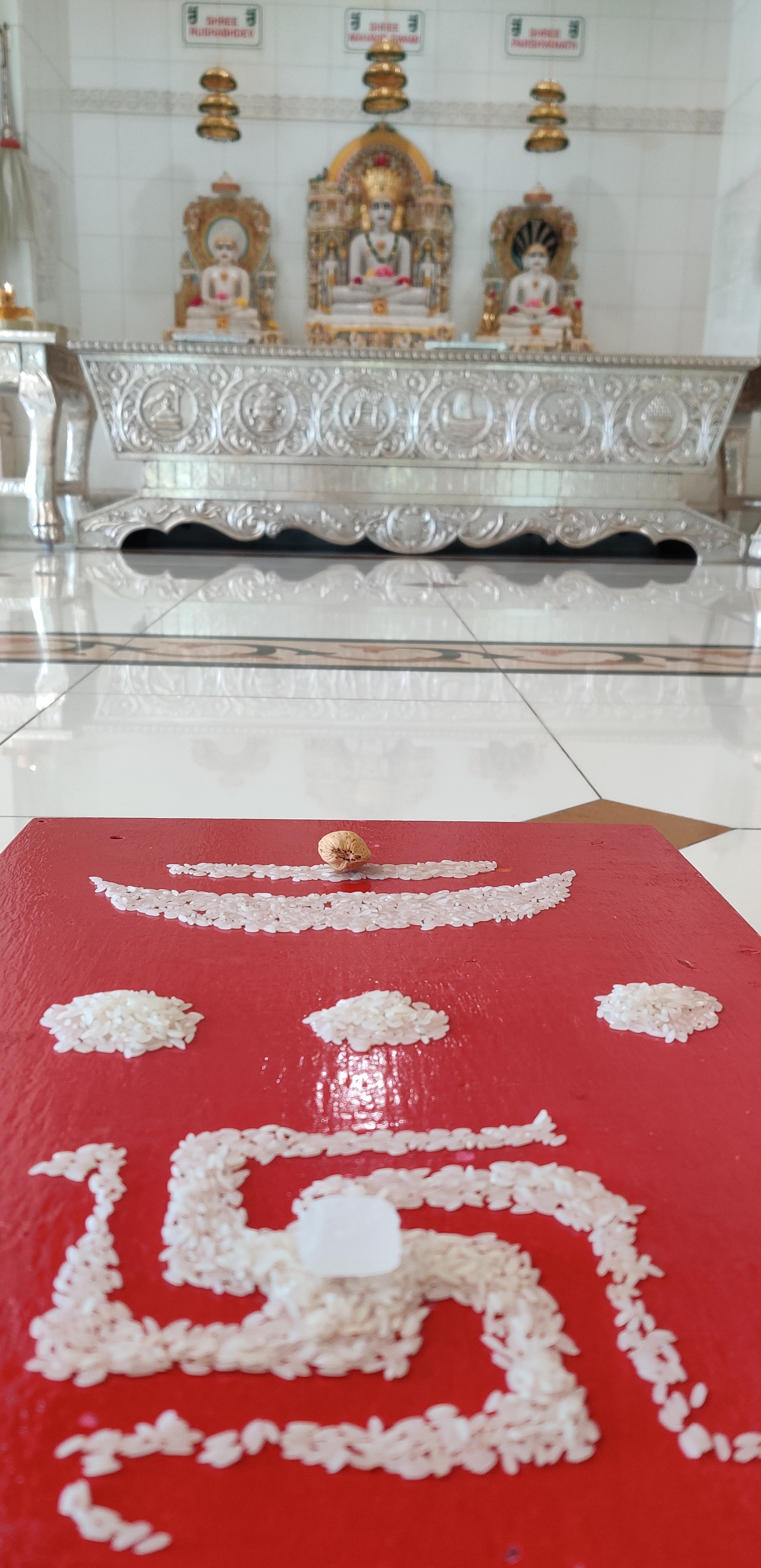
  Agra puja using rice, sweet, and fruit in front of an idol of Mahavira Swami, the 24th Tirthankara at Jain Center of Southern California, Buena Park, California
- Bhāva Pūjā (worshipping of the idol through emotions without using objects of worship): This form of worshipping includes singing stavans and stutis (devotional hymns) extolling the life and qualities of a tirthankara. A sequence of several Prakrit and some Sanskrit prayers extolling a tirthankara in particular seating positions is known as Caityavandan. Caityavandan is usually performed in two postures – Yogamudrā and Muktāśuktimudrā. It also includes 2 kayotsargas and at least 3 hymns and a recitation of major Jain hymns and prayers including Namokar Mantra, Uvasaggaharam Stotra, and Logassa Sutra. It is considered to be a standard form of Bhāva Pūjā amongst the Śvetāmbara laity. Digambaras strictly do not have such form of worshipping of their idols. Bhāva Pūjā does not include the use of any materialistic objects of worship and therefore, can be performed by the mendicants. In fact, devotional hymns are usually authored by the Śvetāmbara mendicants which is why the Śvetāmbara sect has huge and rich literature on devotional worship of the tirthankaras.

Several other forms of worshipping of the idols exist. One of the most popular ones is Snātra Pūjā which is a lengthy ritual that includes mimicking of a tirthankara's ritualistic bathing at Mount Meru by the demi-god Indra. Other popular ritualistic bathing is Śakrastava Abhiṣeka which is performed parallel to the recitation of the hymn of the same name authored by Acharya Siddhasenadiwakarsuri. Usually, regular purification of temples and icons is performed and the ritual for which include 18 Abhiṣeka which is a ritualistic bathing of the idols with 18 excellent objects of high fragrance and devotional value.

==== Vyākhyāna and Guruvandan (interaction with mendicants) ====
The Chaturvidha Sangha has 4 pillars and śrāvakas and śrāvikās (lay followers) derive their knowledge of the religion and its practices from the other two pillars – mendicants (monks and nuns). Vyākhyāna refers to the religious sermons that the mendicants give. It is a result of these sermons that Jainism is propagated to the lay followers. Since reading scriptures without the preceptor's permission is considered to be a grave sin, lay followers (householders) derive all their knowledge of the religion and scriptures as well as their duties and responsibilities from the mendicants' vyākhyānas. As such, even though attending vyākhyānas is not an essential part as per scriptures, lay followers are always encouraged to attend them regularly to learn principles of Jainism. A formal procedure of greeting the preceptor by reciting 2 ancient Prakrit prayers – Icchakāra Sutra and Abbhuthio Sutra and 4 Khamāsamaṉas in a particular sequence is known as Guruvandan. The practice of Guruvandan is only performed by householders of the Śvetāmbara sect.

== Religious festivals ==
There are some festivals which are exclusively celebrated by the Śvetāmbara sect and are neither recognized nor celebrated by the Digambara sect. Following is a list of some of those festivals:

=== Paryuṣaṇa ===
It is one of the most popular of the Jain festivals. It falls during the bright fortnight of the Bhadrapada month of the lunar calendar. During this 8-day long festival, lay followers intensify their spirituality and undertake rigorous fasting. Some of them also fast for all 8 days by consuming either only boiled water or nothing at all (this fast is known as atthai). It is during these 8 days that monks and nuns read the holy canonical scripture - Kalpa Sūtra. Most of the reading is done in private, except the chapter that describes the birth of Mahavira, which is traditionally read and celebrated publicly on the 5th of the 8 days. The 8th day is known as samvatsari and is considered to be one of the holiest days by Śvetāmbara lay followers, who perform pratikramana and seek forgiveness for the sins they committed in the past year by saying "Michchhāmi Dukkaḍaṃ" to the people they know. Digambaras, alternatively, celebrate the Das Lakshana, which is a 10-day long festival and has a different purpose than Paryuṣaṇa.

=== Śāśvata Navpad Oli ===
This is a 9-day long festival that occurs twice a year, once in the Chaitra month and once in the Ashvin month of the lunar calendar. This is one of the two major celebrations as per Śvetāmbara scriptures, the other being Paryuṣaṇa. During this festival, Śvetāmbaras worship the 9 supreme entities, namely Arihant, Siddhā, Ācārya, Upādhyāya, Sādhu, Samyak Darśana, Samyak Jñāna, Samyak Cāritra, and Samyak Tap, one day for each of these entities. Jainism believes that these 9 entities were neither created nor can they be destroyed. It believes in the eternal existence of these 'categories' or padas that propagate dharma. Śvetāmbaras, therefore, consider this festival to be śāśvata (which means that it has existed since eternity and will continue to exist forever).

Throughout these 9 days, Śvetāmbara lay followers perform Ayambil, a form of fasting in which no oil, dairy products, and spices are consumed. This form of fasting is believed to improve control over the sense of taste. They also worship the Siddhachakra during these 9 days. Spiritual practices are intensified during these days just as during the Paryuṣaṇa. One of the most popular legends associated with this festival is of Śrīpāla and Mayaṇasundarī. Mahavir Janma Kalyanak falls on the 7th day of the Navpad Oli that occurs during the Chaitra month. Although Digambaras believe in the legend of Śrīpāla and Mayaṇasundarī, they do not perform Ayambil and their practices are vastly different from the Śvetāmbaras.

=== Jñāna Pañcamī ===
It is celebrated on the 5th day of the bright fortnight of the Kārtika month of the lunar calendar. This festival is celebrated to worship Samyak Jñāna (right knowledge). Rituals include visiting a Jain temple, placing objects of knowledge (such as pen, pencil, paper, books etc.) on a platform and venerating the object with Vāsakṣepa (sandalwood powder) and reciting hymns venerating the demi-goddess Saraswati. In Jainism, the eternal knowledge of the road to moksha is recorded in the word of the tirthankaras and that is known as jinvāṇī. This is what Saraswati represents. Therefore, in Jainism, she is not worshipped as she is in Hinduism, but as the word of the tirthankaras. Jainism endorses the existence of 5 types of knowledge – Mati Jñāna, Śrut Jñāna, Avadhi Jñāna, Manaḥparyaya Jñāna, Kevala Jñāna. All these forms of knowledge are highly venerated and worshipped in the Śvetāmbara sect. Lay followers of the Śvetāmbara sect also perform penance and fast to celebrate the day. Most followers, if they do not perform fasts, refrain from consuming food after sunset.

=== Maun Ekādaśī ===
This festival is celebrated on the 11th day of the bright fortnight of the Maargashirsha month of the lunar calendar. Śvetāmbara legends say that if a devotee performs penance staying mum on this day every year for a period of 11 years and 11 months achieves moksha. The word maun means silence. The most prominent of the penances on this day is to not speak and communicate for the entire day, until the next morning. This form of penance is believed to improve control over the mind and the tongue. According to Śvetāmbara legends, a total of 150 kalyāṇakas of the panch kalyanakas of tirthankaras of the past, present, and future half cycles of time occur on this single day. Therefore, it holds high importance and auspiciousness in the Śvetāmbara sect. Most lay followers begin new ventures and worship tirthankara idols especially apart from performing the penance of staying silent on this day. Several legends including that of Neminatha and Krishna and of Suvrat Shetha are associated with this day.

=== Phālguṇa Pherī ===
This festival is observed on the 13th day of the bright fortnight of the Phalguna month as per the lunar calendar and is directly associated with Palitana, one of the most important pilgrimage sites for the Śvetāmbaras. Śvetāmbara legends state that Krishna's sons Pradyumna and Shyaambh, along with 8.5 crore (85 million) mendicants attained liberation from Bhadva's Dungar at Palitana hills on this day. Śvetāmbara lay followers visit Palitana temples in huge numbers on this day, every year and circumambulate the entire region of Palitana hills in a single day. The walk is 15–18 km long along a hilly terrain. This walk is also known as the 6-Gau Yaatra (walk of visiting 6 villages).

Devotees first ascend the hill until they reach the Ram Pol gate, and then take a different route from the usual route, which is opened only on this day every year for devotees to circumambulate around the hill. This route takes devotees through various 'hidden' regions of the Palitana temples, which are otherwise inaccessible on other days. The shrines that this walk takes a devotee through can be summarized as follows: -

1. The shrine of Devaki's 6 sons – According to the Jain version of Mahabharata, Devaki gave birth to 6 other sons before giving birth to Krishna. These 6 sons were initiated into the Jain sangha by Neminatha. Legend says that all 6 of them attained liberation at the spot where this shrine stands today.
2. Ulkā Jal Deri – It is believed to be the site where the water which is used in ritualistic bathing of the idol of Rishabhanatha gets collected.
3. Chandan Talavdi – Legend says this lake was established by Chillan Muni, a disciple of Ganadhar Pundarik Swami, who was himself one of the prime disciples of Rishabhanatha. It is said that he used his magical powers and established the lake for devotees to quench their thirst while ascending the hill. The lake's banks are of importance as Śvetāmbaras believe several mendicants performed penance in the kayotsarga posture at this point and eventually attained liberation. Several devotees perform kayotsarga here and recite the Logassa hymn.
4. Ajitnath - Shantinath Deri – These are two shrines devoted to the 2nd Tirthankara Ajitanatha and 16th Tirthankara Shantinatha each. Shrines dedicated to these two tirthankaras were constructed because it is believed that these two gave religious sermons in the said area. Legend says that during the 22nd tirthankara Neminatha's period, these two shrines stood opposite to each other and when a devotee would pray at one of these, their back would face the other. However, facing one's back towards tirthankara idols is considered to be a sin. Nandisena, a mendicant at that time, sat in the middle of both these shrines and composed the Ajit-Śānti Stava, a hymn in which alternate verse extol Ajitanatha and Shantinatha. The legend says that by the end of his recitation of the composition, the two shrines came side by side to each other. Today, both shrines stand next to each other.
5. Siddhshila – According to legend, this spot has witnessed more souls attaining moksha than any other spot on Palitana hills.
6. Bhadva's Dungar – This is believed to be the spot where Krishna's sons Pradyumna and Shyaambh attained moksha along with 8.5 crore (85 million) other mendicants. This place is believed to be the inspiration behind the whole walk of around 15–18 km (12 miles).
7. Siddha Vad – This is an old Banyan tree. It is believed that several souls attained moksha while performing penance under this tree.
8. Juni Taleti – This shrine is the old starting point of the ascent of the main hill. This is the point where the Phālguṇa Pherī comes to an end.

=== Dhvajā Mahotsava ===
It is a generic name given to various observances and celebrations at different Jain temples. It refers to the changing of the flag that is hoisted at the top of a Jain temple's śikhara (topmost part of the structure) and is celebrated annually at every Jain temple. A common ritual is followed wherein the devotees bid to get a chance of changing the flag. The highest bidder performs devotional puja according to a ritual described in the scriptures and changes the dhvaj (flag) hoisted on the śikhara every year throughout lifetime passed on generation after generation. Every Jain temple has a different day for the ceremony and it is celebrated on the said temple's anniversary. A svāmi-vātsalya (community lunch) is organized as part of the ceremony.

=== Akshaya Tritiya ===
In Jainism, Akshaya Tritiya is an important festival as it commemorates the first Tirthankara, Rishabhanatha, ending his 400-day-long fast by consuming sugarcane juice poured into his cupped hands. Śvetāmbara Jains perform a similar fast (but consume food on alternate days) that lasts 400 days. This practice is popularly known as Varshitapa. Rishabhanatha renounced worldly pleasures and became a monk. Thereafter, he fasted for 400 days. He did not accept food from lay followers as every time he was given food, it was not 'free of faults' as it should be for a Jain monk to accept. The 42 faults that food given to a Jain monk may have are discussed at length in the ancient Śvetāmbara text Ācārāṅga Sūtra.

== Sthanakvasi and Terapanthi (aniconic) traditions ==
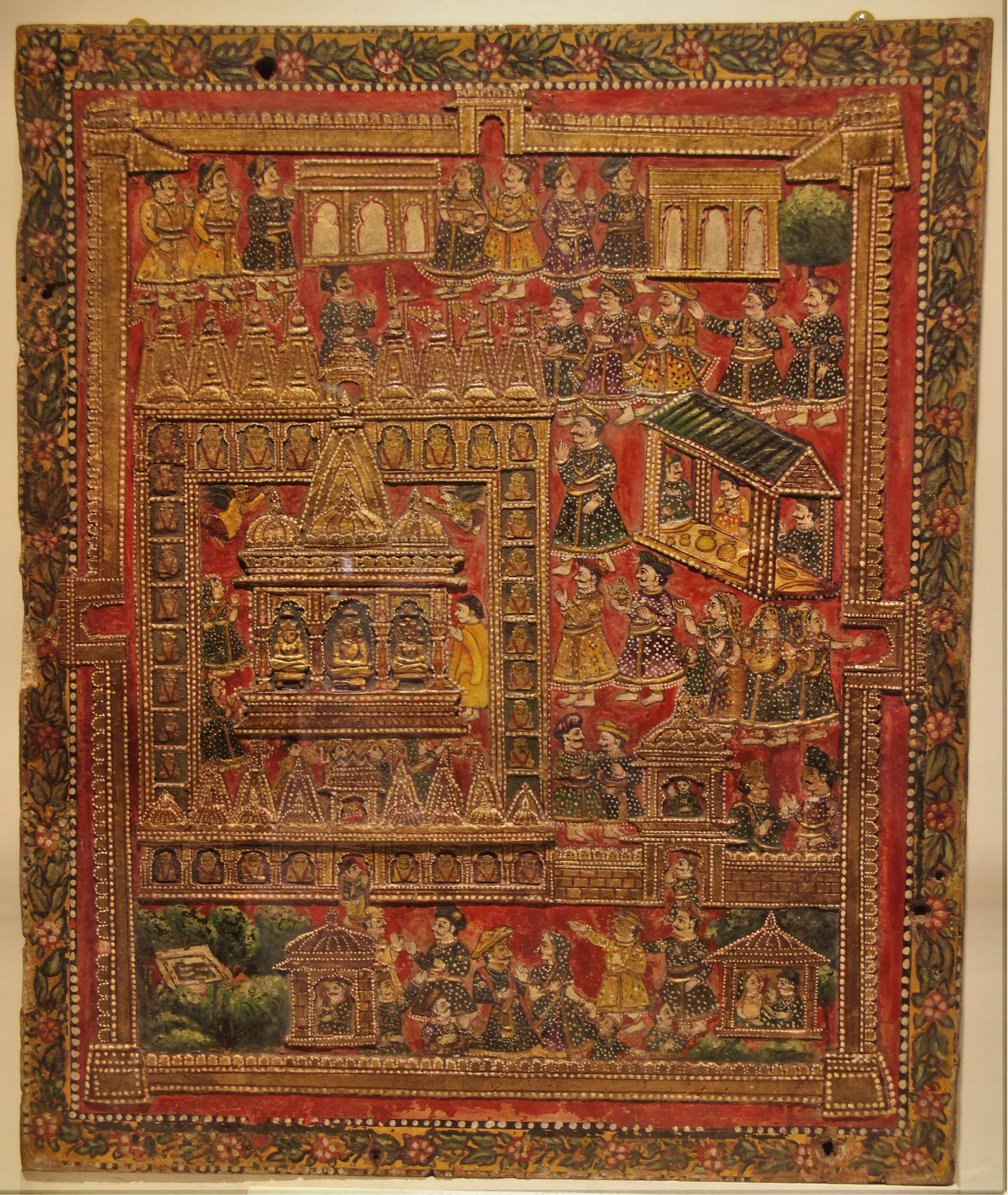
Tirth Pat on display at Prince of Wales museum, Mumbai

A minority of the Śvetāmbaras are split into other traditions where either Jain temples and halls are built but puja is a minor practice, or where all construction and use of temples, images and idols is actively discouraged and avoided. These sub-traditions began around 14th-century through 18th-century and are not considered authentic by any of the major Śvetāmbara monks and scriptures.

A layman who opposed devotional temples, images and idols was Lonka Shah (c. 1476 CE) who is responsible for starting the Sthānakavāsī sub-tradition. Bhikshu was initiated as a Sthānakavāsī monk, but he believed that their teachings were inappropriate. As a result, he started the Terapanth sub-tradition after criticizing the Sthanakvasi sub-tradition's beliefs. Early colonial era observers and some early 20th-century Jain writers such as Malvaniya hypothesized that this movement against idol worship may be the impact of Islam on Jainism, but later scholarship states that the sub-traditions arose from an internal dispute and debate on the principle Ahimsa (non-violence). The newer sub-traditions only accept 32 of the 45 scriptures of the original Śvetāmbara canon. In the 32 they have accepted, several parts have been modified and major sections of their canon is different from the original canon as followed by the oldest sect of the murtipujakas.

These sub-traditions are not recognized by the original Śvetāmbara sect of the idol-worshippers (murtipujakas), who consider that they were created as a result of a grave misinterpretation of canonical scriptures. The murtipujaka Śvetāmbaras do not allow laypersons to read scriptures as a misinterpretation of the canon is considered to be a grave sin. The later sub-traditions have made their canon openly accessible. Both the newer sub-traditions have various sub-traditions within them that do not agree on several aspects of the canon due to an open access to their canon and eventual misinterpretation.

== Differences with Digambaras ==
Other than rejecting or accepting different ancient Jain texts, Digambaras and Śvetāmbara differ in other significant ways such as:

Śvetāmbaras believe that Parshvanatha, the 23rd tirthankara, taught only Four restraints (a claim, scholars say is confirmed by the ancient Buddhist texts that discuss Jain monastic life). Mahāvīra taught Five vows. The Digambara sect disagrees with the Śvetāmbara interpretations, and reject the theory of difference in Parshvanatha and Mahāvīra's teachings. However, Digambaras as well as Śvetāmbaras follow Five vows as taught by Mahavira. The only difference is that Śvetāmbaras believe Parshvanatha taught one vow less (the Four vows except Brahmacharya) than Mahavira. However, monks of Śvetāmbara sect also follow all 5 vows as stated in the Ācārāṅga Sūtra.

- Digambaras believe that both Parshvanatha and Mahāvīra remained unmarried, whereas Śvetāmbara believe the 23rd and 24th tirthankar did indeed marry. According to the Śvetāmbara version, Parshvanāth married Prabhavati, and Mahāvīraswāmi married Yashoda who bore him a daughter named Priyadarshana. The two sects also differ on the origin of Trishala, Mahāvīra's mother, as well as the details of Tirthankara's biographies such as how many auspicious dreams their mothers had when they were in the wombs.Digambaras believe it is 16 dreams while Śvetāmbaras believe it is 14.
- Śvetāmbaras have a more comprehensive set of scriptures as they have a canon with extensive information, supported by the non-canonical literature. Digambara literature is much lesser in volume and their scriptures are more recent than those of the Śvetāmbaras.
- Śvetāmbara believe that the Jain canon is still preserved, whereas Digambaras believe it was lost about 200 years after Mahāvīra's nirvana. Śvetāmbaras also have a richer non-canonical literature.
- Digambara believe Rishabha, Vasupujya and Neminatha were the three tirthankaras who reached omniscience while in sitting posture and other tirthankaras were in standing ascetic posture. In contrast, Śvetāmbaras believe it was Rishabha, Nemi and Mahāvīra who were the three in sitting posture.
- According to Śvetāmbara Jain texts, since Rishabhanatha's time, till date, its monastic community has had more sadhvis than sadhus (female than male mendicants). In Tapa Gacch of the modern era, the ratio of sadhvis to sadhus (nuns to monks) is about 3.5 to 1. In contrast to Śvetāmbara, the Digambara sect monastic community has been predominantly male.
- In the Digambara tradition, a male human being is considered closest to the apex with the potential to achieve his soul's liberation from rebirths through asceticism. Women must gain karmic merit, to be reborn as man, and only then can they achieve spiritual liberation in the Digambara sect of Jainism. The Śvetāmbaras strictly disagree with the Digambaras, believing that women can also achieve liberation from saṃsāra through ascetic practices.
- The Śvetāmbaras state the 19th Tirthankara Māllīnātha was female. However, Digambara reject this, and worship Mallinatha as a male.

== See also ==
- Tirth Pat
