= Sivabhuti =

1st-century Jain monk

In-universe information
- Religion: Jainism

Sivabhuti was a Jain monk in the 1st century AD who is regarded as the founder of the Digambara tradition in 82 AD, according to the 5th-century Śvetāmbara text Avashyak Bhashya, authored by Jinabhadra. Little is known about him, apart from a single story mentioned in this ancient Śvetāmbara work. The text claims him to be a Jain monk of the 1st century CE who is regarded as the founder of the Bottika (probably Digambar) tradition in 82 AD.

== Background ==
Śvetāmbara texts accuse Sivabhuti of initiating the Digambara tradition through "eight concealments", which involved the rejection of Jain scriptures upheld and preserved by the Śvetāmbaras. These texts openly and directly charge him with a serious misinterpretation of the scriptures and traditional Jain doctrines, particularly concerning the wearing of clothes and strī nirvāṇa (the attainment of liberation by women).

== Scholarly views ==
Although some scholars differ on the interpretation of the term Botika, the majority agree that it refers to the Digambaras. Albrecht Weber, a German Indologist, asserts that Botika denotes the Digambara sect. Suzuko Ohira, a Japanese scholar, also discusses this account of the formation of the Digambara tradition in his work Study of Tattvārthasūtra with Bhāṣya.

Digambara scholars such as Shivkant Dwivedi and Navneet Jain similarly support the view that Botika is synonymous with the Digambaras. A.N. Upadhye, a renowned scholar of Jainism, has also discussed this account of the schism in his works. Ratanchand Jain, another Digambara scholar, maintains that Sivabhuti was originally a Śvetāmbara monk who later adopted nudity and other practices associated with the Digambara tradition, and that the Botika sect is identical to the modern-day Digambara sect.

At times, Indian scholars have drawn comparisons between the Digambaras (Botikas) and the Ājīvikas, primarily on the basis of their shared practice of nudity. Professor Pranabananda Jash, an Indian scholar, also holds that the Digambaras were the Botikas referred to in the writings of Jinabhadra Gaṇi Kṣamāśramaṇa, particularly in the context of the eight schisms within the Jaina community. Acharya Haribhadrasuri, in his works, similarly recounts the origin of the Botika sect. According to Sthānakavāsī scholar Hastimal Maharaja, this narrative accurately reflects the emergence of the Digambara tradition.

The earliest extant reference to this account of the schism dates back to before 500 CE—at least 500 years earlier than the first recorded evidence supporting the contrasting Digambara viewpoint.

== Story of the creation of the Digambara sect ==
According to the Śvetāmbara tradition, the Digambara sect was founded by a rebellious monk named Sivabhuti in 82 CE. This account is primarily based on the Avashyak Bhāṣya, a scripture composed by Acharya Jinabhadragaṇi Kṣamāśramaṇa. Other important Śvetāmbara texts, such as Vijayalakṣmīsūri's Upadeśa Prasāda and Kupākṣa Kauśika Sahasra Kiraṇa Aparṇam Pravacana Parīkṣā, also mention Sivabhuti. Another Śvetāmbara work, Nihṇavavāda, similarly refers to him.

The narrative states that around 609 years after Mahavira attained nirvāṇa, there existed a city called Rathavirapur near present-day Mathura. A layperson named Sivabhuti lived there and served King Sinharath, earning several accolades for his dedicated service. Over time, he became proud and often stayed out late at night. On one occasion, his wife complained to his mother. In response, and as a lesson, his mother asked him to leave home. Wandering from place to place, he eventually arrived at the upāśraya (Jain monastic residence) of Arya Krishnasuri. After confessing and repenting (known as ālochanā) before the ācārya, he expressed his desire to become a monk, and was initiated accordingly.

During his monastic life, Sivabhuti once returned to Rathavīrapur. Upon learning of his visit, the king presented him with a precious shawl (ratna-kambala). However, accepting such a luxury violated the Jain vow of aparigraha (non-possession). His preceptor, Ācārya Kṛṣṇasūri, tried to counsel him, but Sivabhuti was unconvinced. The ācārya eventually tore the shawl, which deeply offended Sivabhuti. In protest, he argued that if a shawl were a possession, then so were clothes. He immediately renounced clothing and embraced nudity. Two monks, Kauṇḍinya and Koṭṭavīra, joined him as disciples, marking the origin of the Digambara sect. Sivabhuti began preaching that moksha could only be achieved through complete renunciation of all possessions, including clothes.

Śvetāmbara sources assert that Sivabhuti had once heard his preceptor mention jinakalpa—a practice involving total renunciation, including nudity. However, this path was believed to have become extinct after Ganadhar Jambuswami. Due to his limited understanding of the scriptures, Sivabhuti began to imitate the Tirthankars, preaching that public nudity was acceptable in Jainism—even without comprehensive scriptural knowledge. This interpretation contradicted key Śvetāmbara scriptures such as the Ācārāṅga Sūtra and the Uttaradhyayana Sutra.

The same scripture also records that Uttara, Sivabhuti's sister, adopted nudity and joined his group. However, societal perceptions labelled her as a prostitute. As a result, Sivabhuti prohibited women from practicing nudity. The courtesans of the town feared that their livelihood would be affected if people saw women in such a state. Consequently, a doctrinal condition was established: since women possessed clothing in the Digambara tradition, they were considered unfit for moksha or liberation. This aligns with the contemporary Digambara view that women cannot attain salvation in their current form.
