= Jinvani Channel =

- Country: India
- Nation: India
- Parent: Jain Telemedia Services Ltd of the parent company Sea TV Network Ltd
- Official website: www.jinvanichannel.com

Jinvani Channel is an Indian television channel solely dedicated to the Digambara group of Jainism. It was launched on 9 December 2011 under the aegis of Jain Telemedia Services Ltd of the parent company Sea TV Network Ltd.

== Shows ==
- Aahar Charya
- Aalochna Path
- Aaradhna
- ABCD Of Jainism
- Dharmyatra
- Healthy Living
- Jain Focus
- Jain Jyotish(Live Call Show)
- Janm Jayanti Programme
- Jigyasa Samadhan
- Jin Bhakti
- Jinvani Vandna
- Kaavyanjali
- Mangal Aarti
- Santvani (Amit Sagar Ji Maharaj)

== See also ==
- Airtel digital TV
