= Ratnasundarsuri =

Indian Jain monk

Acharya Ratnasundarsuri
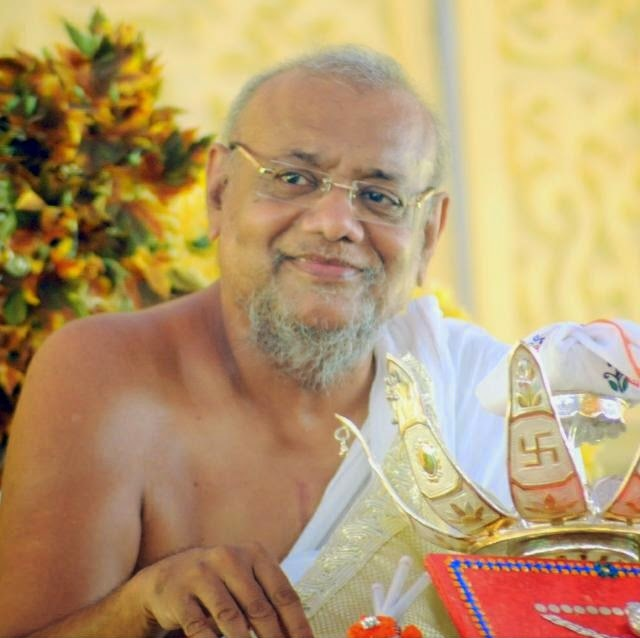
- Ratnasundarsuri in 2017
- Official name: Acharya Vijay Ratnasundarsurishwarji Maharaj Saheb

Personal life
- Born: Rajni; 5 January 1948 (age 78) Depla near Palitana, Gujarat, India
- Parent(s): Dalichand, Champaben

Religious life
- Religion: Jainism
- Sect: Śvetāmbara
- Initiation: Ratnasundarvijay; 1967 by Bhuvanbhanusuri
- Website: www.ratnaworld.com

Ratnasundarsuri (born 5 January 1948) is an Indian Jain monk, activist and Gujarati language writer. He is well known for his lectures on spirituality and social issues.

== Biography ==
Ratnasundarsuri was born at Depla village near Palitana (now in Gujarat), India to Dalichand and Champaben. His birth name was Rajni. He was initiated in asceticism in 1967 under Bhuvanbhanusuri. He was conferred the title of Acharya in 1996. He spent four years in Delhi starting 2006. In 2011, he started a petition to ban meat export from India. In July 2013, he filed a petition to the Rajya Sabha to ban sex education and online pornography.

== Works ==
In spite of being a religious saint, he has written many visionary books for the socio-cultural upliftment of the individual as well as society at large. Till today, he has written 500 books on variety of subjects and holds the Golden Book of World Records for writing more than 300 books in a single language (Gujarati). Lakhi Rakho Aras Ni Takati Par is his most acclaimed book. It is translated in 20 languages including Hindi, English, Urdu, Marathi, French and German. His lectures on the television are popular.

== Recognition ==
In 2017, he was awarded Padma Bhushan, the third highest civilian award by Government of India for his contribution in field of spirituality.
