= Nishitha =

Information
- Religion: Jainism

The Niśītha Sūtra (Prakrit:Nisīha Sutta) is a Jaina Śvetāmbara canonical text in Prakrit. This text is one of the six Chedasūtras. The text consists of twenty chapters. It prescribes some rules pertaining to monastic life. Punishments for various transgressions are also prescribed in it. Certain exceptions to the general rules also find place therein.
