= Fasting in Jainism =

Fasting is very common among Jains and as a part of festivals. Most Jains fast at special times such as birthdays, anniversaries, during festivals, and on holy days. Paryushana is the most prominent festival, lasting eight days in Śvetāmbara Jain tradition and ten days in Digambara Jain tradition during the monsoon. The monsoon is a time for Jains to observe most of the religious procedures. However, a Jain may fast at any time. Jain saints usually perform fasts every now and then but at times it becomes a compulsion for them when they have committed an error in relation to the preachings of Mahavira. Variations in fasts encourage Jains to do whatever they can to maintain whatever self control is possible for the individual. According to Jain texts, abstaining from the pleasures of the five senses such as sounds and dwelling in the self in deep concentration is fasting (upavāsa).

== Aims for fasting ==
Fasting can be done to purify both the body and the soul but fasts are also done as a penance.

== Proşadhopavāsa ==
The word Proşadha refers to the holy days in the lunar month. It means giving up the four kinds of food. Proşadhopavāsa is fasting on the eighth and fourteenth days of the lunar cycle. According to Jain text, Puruşārthasiddhyupāya:

For the sake of strengthening the performance of daily meditation (sāmāyika), one must undertake fasting twice each lunar fortnight (Proşadhopavāsa).

— Puruşārthasiddhyupāya (151)

Free from all routine activities, and giving up attachment to own body etc., one should commence fasting from mid-day prior to the day of fasting (the eighth and the fourteenth day of each lunar fortnight).

— Puruşārthasiddhyupāya (152)

The person fasting discards bodily adornments such as bath, perfume, garlands, and ornaments, and spends their time in a sacred place such as the abode of a saint or a temple, or somewhere on their own contemplating pure thoughts by listening to scripture.

== Types of fasting ==
There are several types of fasts:

- Chauvihar Upavāsa: Any type of food and water is restricted in this fast, starting from previous sunset to next day sunrise (approx 36 hours). This upavāsa is considered toughest.
- Tivihar Upavāsa: To give up only food for the whole day, starting from previous sunset to 3rd day sunrise and so approximately 36 hours. Only boiled water can be consumed in Tivihar Upavāsa from 48 minutes after sunrise till sunset on the 2nd day only.
- Aayambil: To have just one meal in the entire day (typically, lunch) and boiled water. This meal cannot include the following foodstuffs:
  - Any forms of spices like chilly powder, turmeric powder, dhaniya jeera powder, cumin seeds, sugar and foodstuffs like oil, ghee and honey.
  - Any form of dairy products like milk, curd, cheese, paneer.
  - Any forms of direct or processed dryfruits, fruits or vegetables.
  - Any form of beverages like tea or coffee.
  - Sweet, sour, or spicy food. Only basic food is permitted which includes foodstuffs made from primary grains and pulses like wheat, rice, green gram, chickpea, urad dal etc. Food prepared using the flours of these grains and pulses - wheat flour, rice flour, gram flour (besan) are permissible. The allowed spices include salt, black pepper, asafoetida powder, baking soda. Chappatis, rice, idli and dosa are allowed if made without oil, ghee, butter or any of the ingredients listed above. This fast is considered to be tougher than staying hungry (upavāsa) because (almost) tasteless food is consumed to complete this fast.
- Ekasana: Having only one meal per day.
- Biyasana: Having two meals a day.
- Chauvihar: No food or water after sunset until at least Navkarsi next day. Many Jains practise this daily. Many Jains leave food or water before forty-eight minutes of sunset.
- Tivihar: No food after sunset until at least Navkarsi next day. Water is permitted until midnight.
- Duvihar: No food after sunset until at least Navkarsi next day. Water, milk, and medicine are permitted. People who are ill usually practice this.
- Partial fasting (unodar): Eating less than you desire and to simply avoid hunger.
- Vruti Sankshep: Limiting the number of items eaten.
- Rasa Parityag: Giving up favourite foods.
- Aathai: No food for constant 8 days, only boiled water.
- Navai: No food for constant 9 days, only boiled water.
- Solbhathu: No food for constant 16 days, only boiled water.
- Great fasts are fasts for months at a time. Maaskshaman: To give up food and water or only food continuously for a whole month.
- Varshitapa is an upavāsa, fasting for 36 hours, on alternate days for 13 lunar months and 13 days continuously. In Varshitapa a person eats on alternate days between sunrise and sunset only. A person can not eat on any two consecutive days for the period of fast but can fast on two consecutive days.

=== Sallekhana ===
Sallekhanā is the last vow prescribed by the Jain ethical code of conduct. The vow of sallekhanā is observed by the Jain ascetics and lay votaries at the end of their life by gradually reducing the intake of food and liquids. This practice has been subject to ongoing debate by human rights experts.

== See also ==
- List of diets

== See also ==
- Jain vegetarianism
