= Jinabhadra =

Jain monk (520–623)

Vācanācārya Jinabhadra Gaṇī Kṣamāśramaṇa

Personal life
- Born: 520 AD
- Died: 623 AD

Religious life
- Religion: Jainism
- Sect: Śvetāmbara

Jinabhadra or Vācanācārya Jinabhadragaṇī Kṣamāśramaṇa was Jain ascetic author of Prakrit and Sanskrit texts.

== Life ==
Jinabhadra (520-623 AD) was a Śvetāmbara Jain monk during sixth-seventh century CE. Not much is known about his life but it seems that he traveled in western parts of India. He belonged to Nirvṛttikula branch of Jainism and was head of several monks. He was at Vallabhi during the reign of Maitraka king Shiladitya I in 609 CE (Saka Samvat 531). He had knowledge of Jain canonical texts as well as the other philosophical systems prevalent in India.

== Works ==
He restored Mahāniśītha, a canonical text, in Mathura. He wrote several Prakrit texts; Bṛhatsaṅgrahiṇī, Bṛhatkṣetrasamāsa, Viśeṣaṇavatī, Viśeṣāvaśyaka, Dhyānaśataka, Jītakalpa and its Bhashya. Sanskrit commentary on Visheshavashyaka remained unfinished.

Jinabhadra elaborated the Debate with the Ganadharas, a work associated with the literature on Avaśyakasūtra which has achieved quasi autonomous status. According to this text, the learned Brahmin Gautama summoned the gods to a great sacrifice but instead they flew off to hear Mahāvīra preaching at his second samavasarana near by. In fury, Gautama confronted Mahavīra in debate, as did ten other brahmins in succession, with the fordmaker converting them all by a demonstration, underpinned by his claim to omniscience.
