= Jinvani =

Body of teachings in Jainism

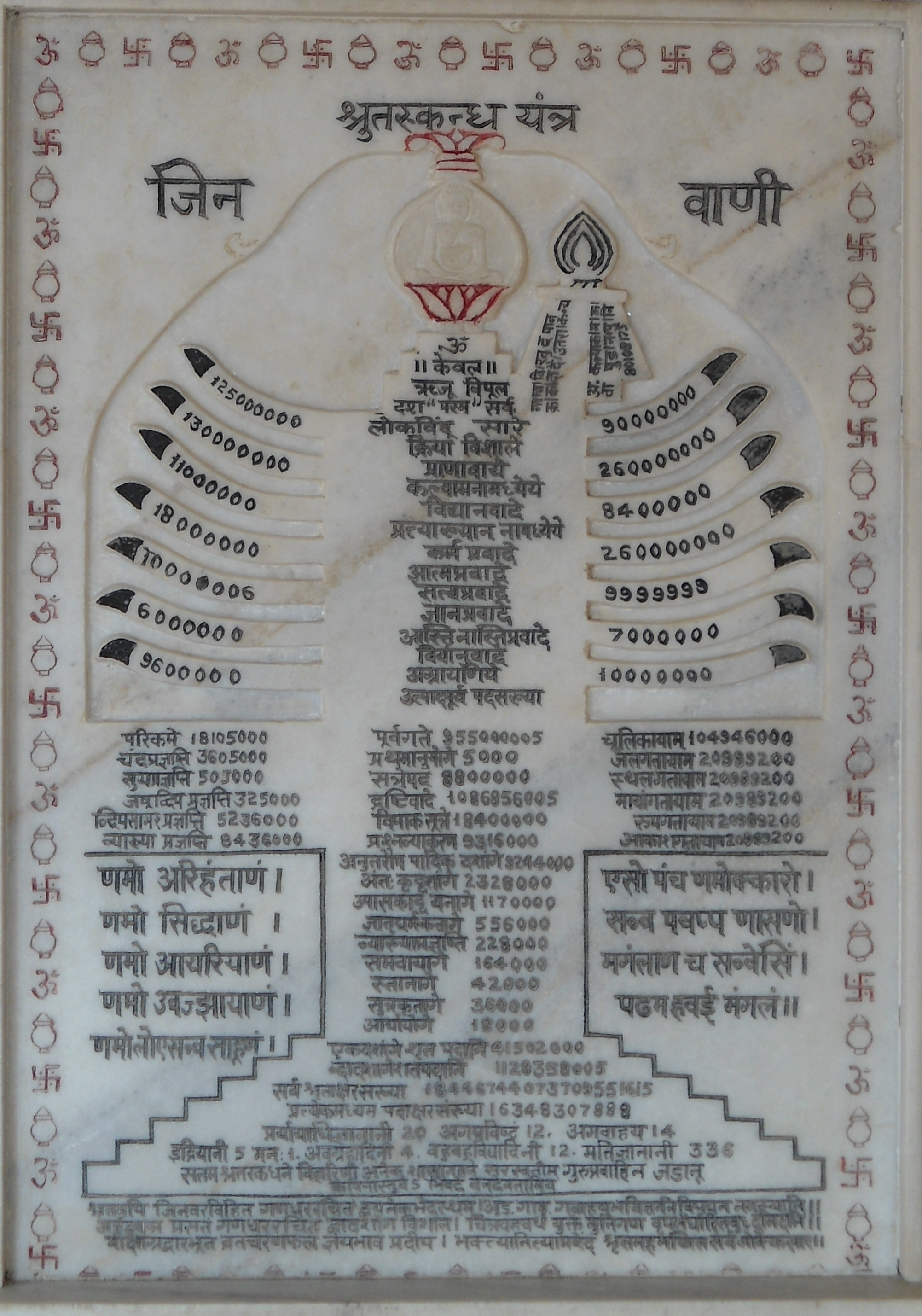
- Stela depicting Jinvani

Information
- Religion: Jainism

In Jainism, Jinvani means the message or the teachings of the Jina (arihant). It is made up of two words Jina (arihant) and Vani (voice). Often the words are spelled out separately or put together as "Jinavani" in publications. It is depicted in various forms, such as "Jinwani" which may be a hymn (or a village in India, by coincidence), and is also personified as Jinvani Maa (Mother Jinvani). The omniscient form of Jina-Vani (relative to Kevala Jnana) is said to be a letterless speech, when emanating from an arihant, which is understandable by all present, in their own language, as it is transformed into lettered discourse. In literature, discourses of the tirthankara (or jineshwar) are generally referred to as Jinvani (or Jin-Vaani), as well as Srutu Jnana (or Shrut Jnana), meaning scriptural knowledge.

== Depiction ==
There is a statue of Saraswati Devi, goddess of knowledge, having Jinvani in her hand on Lotus behind the Peacock in the Shantinath Jain Teerth. Likewise, she may be referred to as Jinavani, for presiding over Jaina scriptures.

== See also ==
- God in Jainism
- Jain epistemology
- Jain literature
- Jinvani Channel
