= Sthānakavāsī =

Sub-tradition of Svetambara Jainism

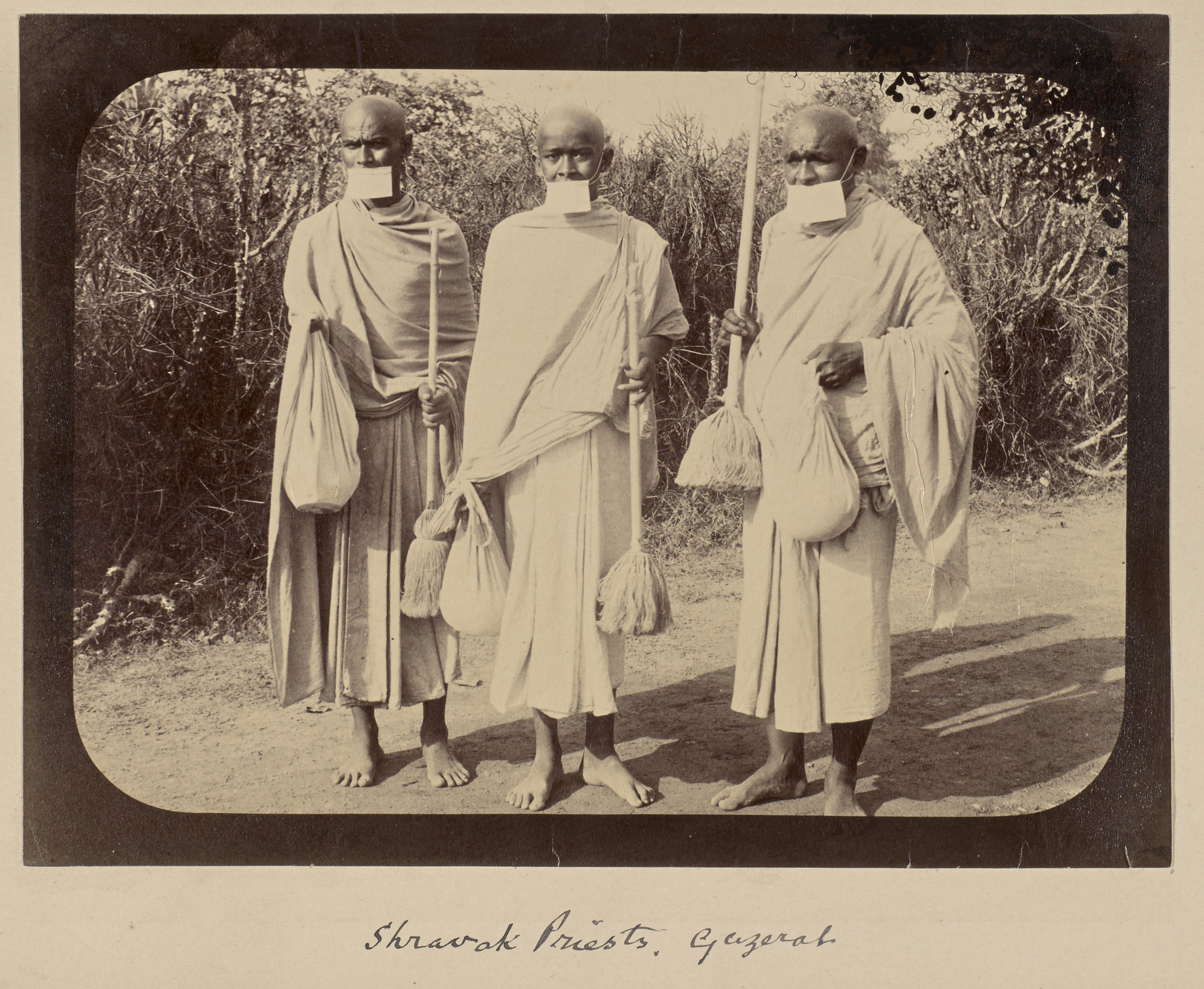
Some Sthanakvasi monks from Gujarat

Sthānakavāsī is a sect of Śvetāmbara Jainism which was founded in the 17th century. The Sthanakvasi, whose name refers to the sect's preference for performing religious duties at a secular place such as a monks' meetinghouse (sthanak) rather than at a temple, is different from the Murtipujaka sect in that it rejects idolatry. It believes that idol worship is not essential in the path of soul purification and attainment of Nirvana/Moksha. Sthānakavāsī accept thirty-two of the Jain Agamas, the Śvetāmbara canon, contending that the scriptures make no mention of idol worship and temples. According to the sect, Mahavira himself never endorsed idol worship, and they argue that such practices were borrowed from other religions by the Murtipujaka Jains.

== History ==
In the 15th century, the Jain reformer Loṅkā Śāh, a scribe in the Gujarat region, played a pivotal role in the development of the Sthanakavasi tradition. Based on numerous Jain scriptures and manuscripts, Loṅkā interpreted them as lacking references to temple construction or image worship, despite these practices being prevalent at the time. He asserted that such practices were spiritually hazardous, violating the principle of ahiṃsā (non-injury) central to Jain philosophy. Loṅkā argued that building temples led to the destruction of microscopic organisms, and ritualistic pūjā (worship) involved subtle forms of harm through material offerings like flowers or incense.

Loṅkā's influence endures, revealing an iconoclastic tendency within a strict doctrinal interpretation of Jain teachings. The Sthanakvasi sect was founded in the 17th century by Lava of Surat, a follower of Loṅkā. Today, both the Śvetāmbara Sthānakavāsī and Terāpanthī sects align with Loṅkā, asserting that mental worship (bhāva-pūjā) is the most appropriate form of religious practice. They argue that reliance on images and temples signifies an attachment to material objects that is spiritually counterproductive.

In contrast, Mūrtipūjaka Jains respond to these criticisms by highlighting the scriptural prevalence of image worship and emphasizing the necessity of images for the spiritual practices of laypeople. A notable figure in this discourse is Ātmārām (1837–1896), initially a Śvetāmbara Sthānakavāsī monk who later became the mendicant leader Ācārya Vijayānandasūri. Upon studying early Jain texts in Prakrit and their Sanskrit commentaries, Ātmārām discovered abundant references to image worship. This revelation led him to challenge the non-Mūrtipūjaka position, asserting that it contradicted Jain scripture.
