= Uttaradhyayana =

Śvētāmbara text

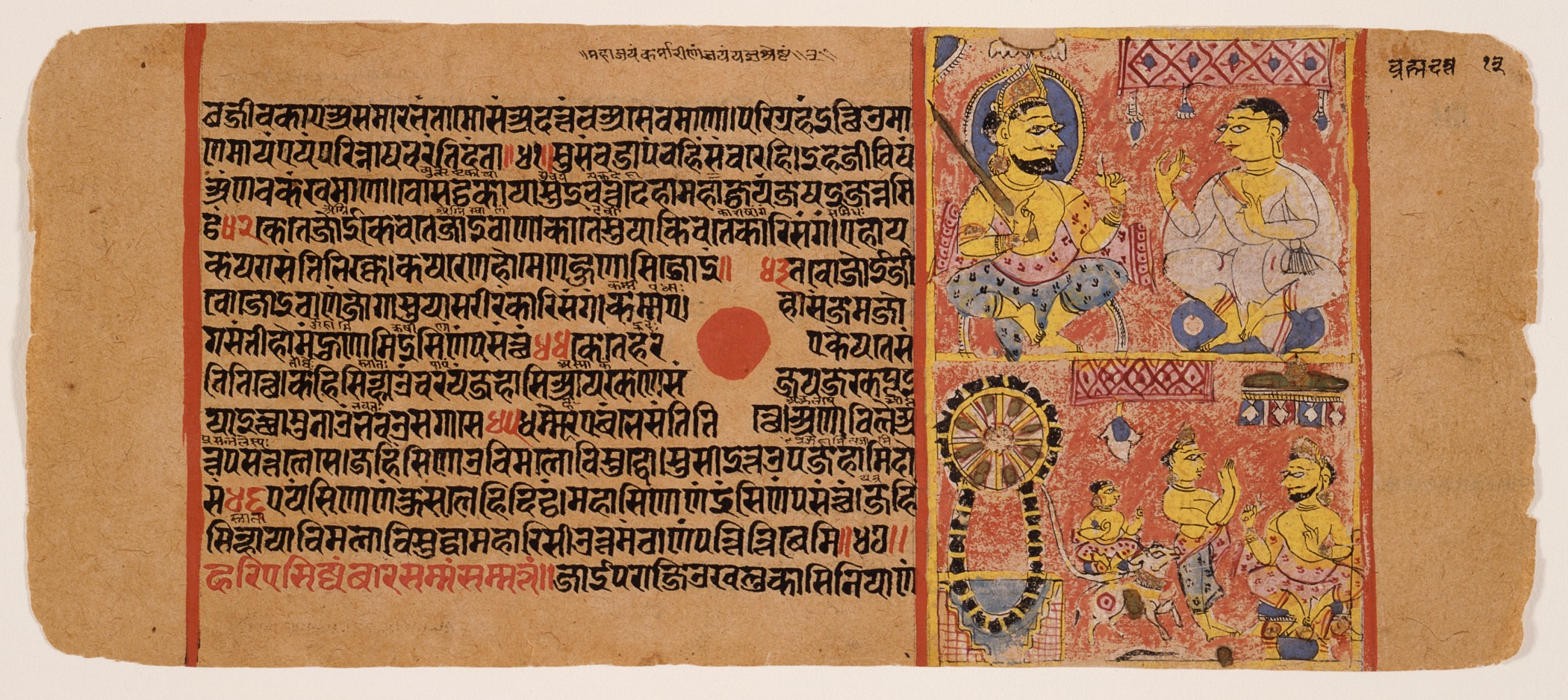
- A King and a Monk, a story from the Uttaradhyayanasutra

Information
- Religion: Jainism
- Language: Prakrit

Uttaradhyayana or Uttaradhyayana Sutra is one of the most important and sacred books of Jains. It consists of 36 chapters, each of which deals with aspects of Jain doctrine and discipline. It is believed by some to contain the actual words of Bhagwan Mahavira (599/540 - 527/468 BCE) - the 24th Tirthankara, though scholars analyze that the current text is a composite from different dates. The Uttaradhyayana mainly concerns central Jain principles illustrated through the use of anecdotes, parables, and historical stories through 36 chapters.

== See also ==
- List of Jain texts

== Sources ==
- Cort, John E. (22 March 2001), Jains in the World : Religious Values and Ideology in India: Religious Values and Ideology in India, USA: Oxford University Press, ISBN 978-0-19-803037-9
