= John E. Cort =

Indologist specialized in Jainism (born 1953)

- Born: 1953 (age 71–72)
- Alma mater: University of Wisconsin–Madison; Harvard University
- Employer: Denison University
- Awards: Guggenheim Fellowship (2017)
- Website: denison.edu/people/john-cort

John E. Cort (born 1953) is an American indologist. He is a professor of Asian and Comparative Religions at Denison University, where he is also Chair of the Department of Religion. He has studied Jainism and the history of Jain society over four decades, authored several books on Jainism, and is one of the editors of the forthcoming Brill Encyclopedia of Jainism. According to a review published in 2006 by Peter Flügel, the influence of the studies and publications of Cort on Jainism "have been immense", and in some respects dominated the field of Jain studies.

Cort's studies have also included comparative Indology, such as a comparison of caste systems in Jainism and Hinduism.

Cort has a BA (1974) and MA (1982) in South Asian Studies from the University of Wisconsin and an AM (1984) and PhD (1989) from Harvard University.
