= Puṇṇa Sunāparantaka =

Buddhist figure

Ven. Puṇṇa Sunāparantaka, also simply known as Punna, is one of the important figures appearing in early Buddhist literature.

The Ven. Puṇṇa addressed to in the Puṇṇasuttaṃ is, according to the commentaries, Ven. Puṇṇa Sunāparantaka, a vaishya merchant, native of Sunāparanta, who became a bhikkhu after listening to the Buddha as he passed through Sāvatthī on one of his travels. When asked by the Buddha what he would think if people were to assault or kill him, each time Puṇṇa Sunāparantaka explained how he would find himself fortunate. As a result, the Buddha commended Puṇṇa Sunāparantaka on his self-control and peacefulness. Puṇṇa Sunāparantaka went on to establish thousands of lay followers in the Buddha's teaching. Upon Sunāparantaka's death, the Buddha discerned that he had attained final Nirvana.

== See also ==
- Atthakatha - Commentaries on Pali Tipitaka
- Savatthi
