= Shobhnath temple =

Jain temple in the state of Uttar Pradesh

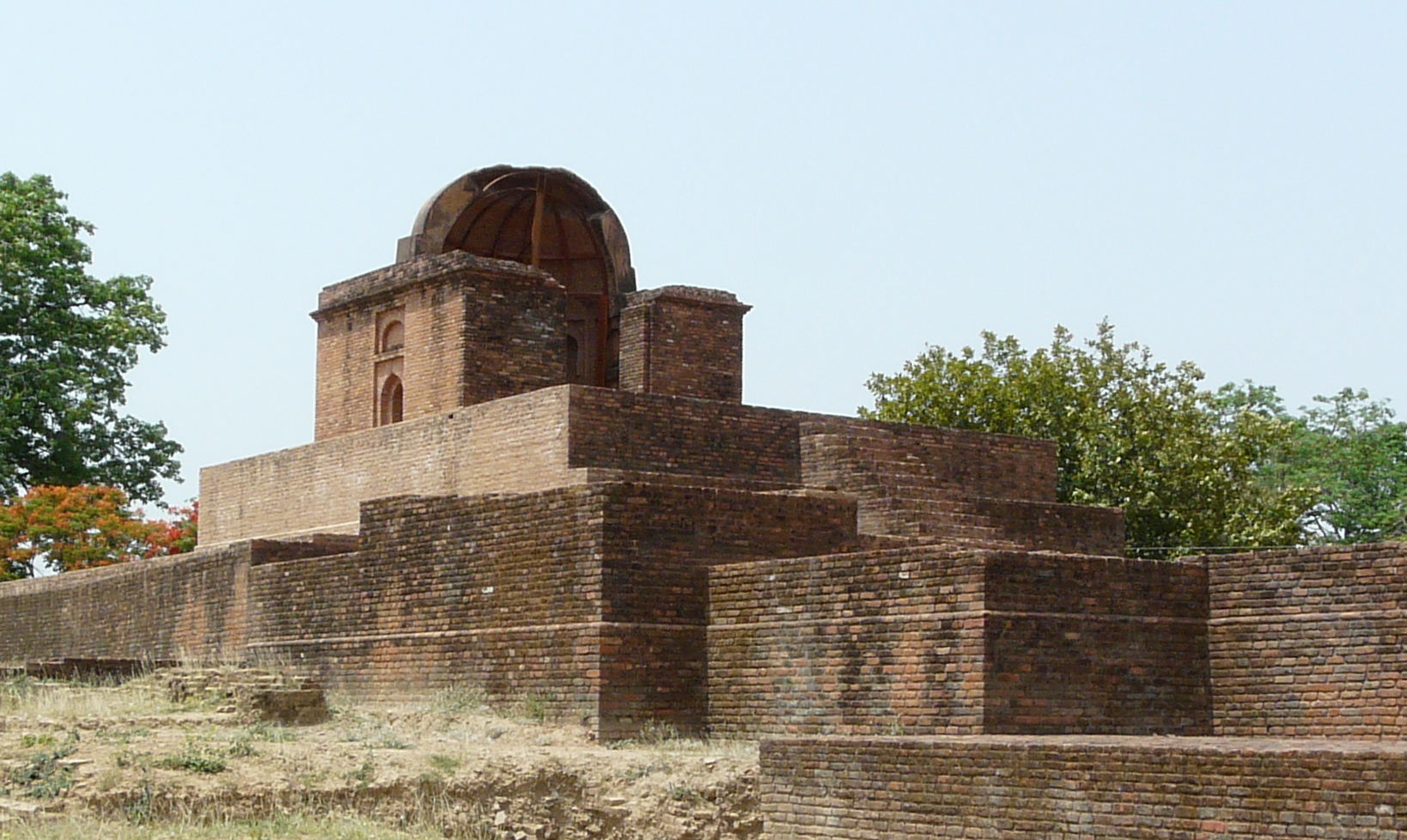
- Shobhnath temple

Religion
- Affiliation: Jainism
- Deity: Sambhavanatha
- Festivals: Mahavir Jayanti, Kartik Purnima
- Governing body: Shri Digambar Jain Teerth Kshetra Committee; Shri Shwetamber Jain Mandir trust

Location
- Location: Shravasti, Uttar Pradesh
- Interactive map of Shobhnath temple
- Coordinates: 27°30′53.5″N 82°02′34.6″E

Architecture
- Temple: 6

Shobhnath temple is an ancient Jain temple located in the Shravasti city of Uttar Pradesh.

== Importance ==
Shravasti is believed to be the birthplace of the Sambhavanatha, the third Tirthankara. Sambhavanatha also took the diksha from a nearby forest named Sahetuk forest and spent 14 years before attaining moksha.

This site was also visited by Chandraprabha, the eighth Tirthankara, during his vihara (travel).

== History ==
Shravasti was ruled by Jain king from 9th—10th century such as Mayurdhwaj (900 CE), Hansdhwaj (925 CE), Makardhwaj (950 CE), Sudhavadhwaj (975 CE) and Suhridhwaj (1000 CE). Harivamsa Purana, composed by Jain acharya Jinasena in 783 CE, narrates the installation images of Kamadeva and Rati by Kamadatta in front of the temple. Kartik Purnima is the primary festival of this temple. Shobhnath temple is mentioned in the Vividha Tirtha Kalpa composed by Jinaprabha Suri in 14th century.

== About temple ==
The temple is dedicated to the Sambhavanatha to commemorate his birthplace. The irani style dome was added to the temple medieval period. The remains of three Jain temples were found during the excavations. A number of Jain idols has been discovered in padmasan and kayotsarga posture dating back to 10th—11th century CE from lower part of the temple. It is believed that idols of all 24 Tirthankaras existed here. The idol of Rishabhanatha found during the excavation is noteworthy. The idol has Rishabhanatha in padmasan posture with three umberallas over the head, two lions and bull carved beneath his legs and yaksha-yakshi on each side. Idols of chaitya vriksha (chaitya-tree) and Goddessess have also been discovered. According to estimates there could be as many as 18 temples in the area. Two new Jain temples were constructed in 1966 and 1995 respectively. Three Jain temples, two belonging to Śvētāmbara and one Digambara, were constructed recently.

A fair is organised annually in October–November to commemorate Janma kalyāṇaka of Sambhavanatha.

== See also ==
- Jetavana
- Sarnath Jain Tirth
