= Sambhavanatha =

Third Tirthankara in Jainism

- 3rd Jain Tirthankara
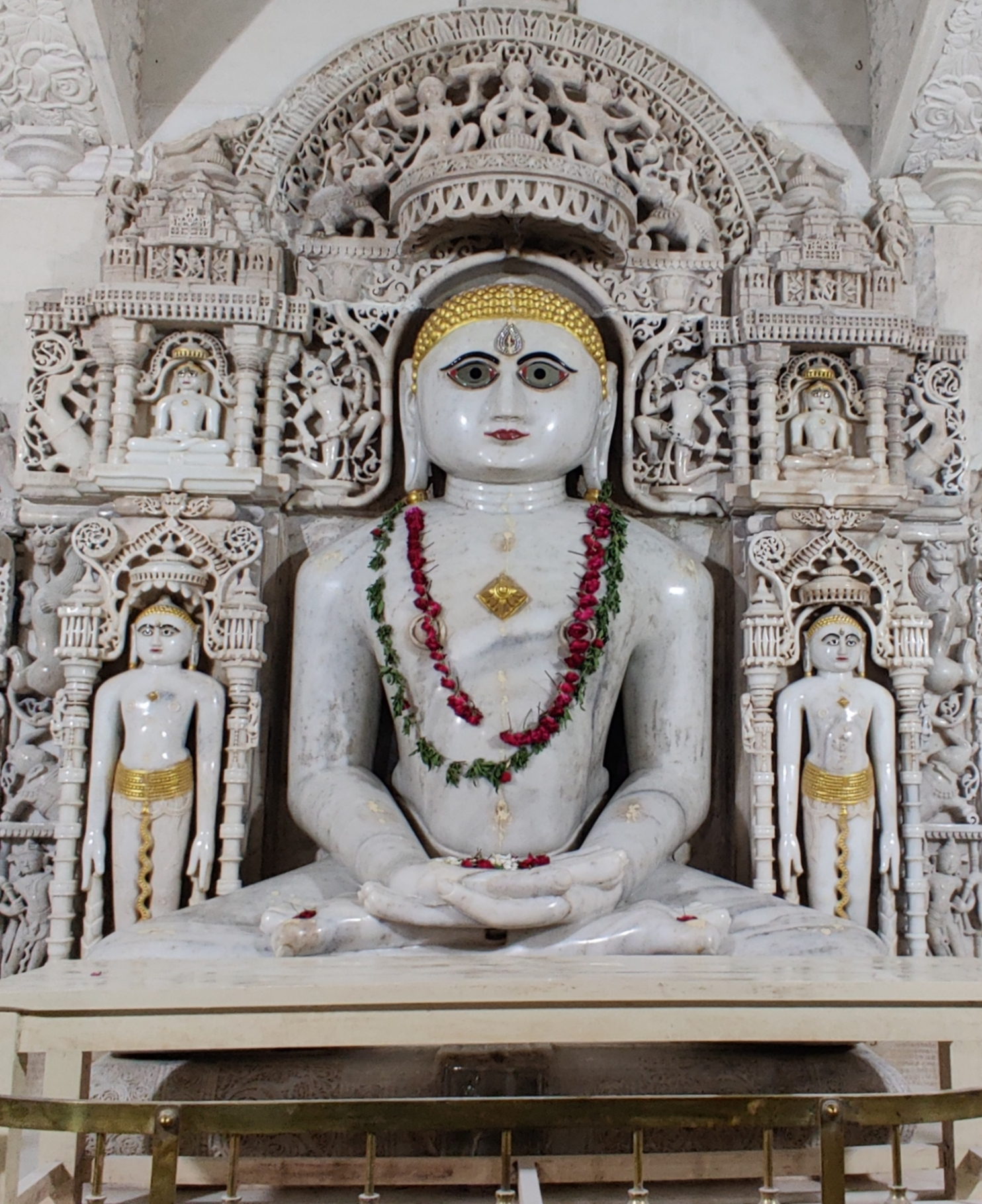
- The largest known single-stone idol of the 3rd Sambhavnatha Bhagwan at Sambhavnath ni Khadki, Ahmedabad, Gujarat, India
- Venerated in: Jainism
- Predecessor: Ajitanatha
- Successor: Abhinandananatha
- Symbol: Horse
- Height: 400 dhanusa (1,200 meters)
- Age: 6,000,000 purva
- Color: Golden

Genealogy
- Born: Shravasti
- Died: Sammed Shikhar
- Parents: Jitārī (father); Susenā (mother)
- Dynasty: Ikṣvākuvaṁśa

Sambhavanatha is venerated as the third tirthankara of the current cosmic age (avasarpini) in Jainism. According to Jain universal history, he was born into the ancient Ikshvaku dynasty to King Jitari and Queen Susena in the city of Shravasti. Following a period of royal life, traditional accounts describe him renouncing his kingdom to become an ascetic, eventually attaining omniscience (Kevala Jnana) beneath a Sala tree (Shorea robusta). He ultimately achieved spiritual liberation from the cycle of rebirth (moksha) on the sacred peaks of Mount Shikharji in modern-day Jharkhand.

In Jain art and iconography, Sambhavanatha is traditionally depicted in a meditative posture with a golden physical complexion. He is distinctly identified by his unique iconographic emblem, the horse, which is typically carved onto the pedestal of his idols, as well as his association with specific guardian deities such as the multi-faced yaksha Trimukha.

As a foundational spiritual figure, Sambhavanatha is actively venerated across the Indian subcontinent. Major architectural monuments and pilgrimage centers dedicated to his worship span multiple regions, including the archaeological ruins of the ancient Shobhnath temple at his birthplace in Uttar Pradesh, historic shrines within Rajasthan's Ranthambore Fort, and the classic 16th-century Chaturmukha Basadi in Karnataka.

== Life and legends ==
According to Jain tradition, Sambhavanatha is venerated as the third tirthankara of the present cosmic age (avasarpini). Jain universal history states that he was born into the ancient Ikshvaku dynasty to King Jitari and Queen Susena in the city of Shravasti. Within the expansive framework of Jain cosmology, texts attribute to him a symbolic lifespan of 6,000,000 purvas and a towering physical height of 400 bows (dhanushas) (1,200 meters). According to traditional narratives, particularly those found in Digambara texts such as the Uttarapurana, he is believed to have possessed three distinct types of auspicious knowledge from the moment of his birth.

Following a period of ruling his kingdom, traditional accounts describe him renouncing worldly attachments to become an ascetic, eventually attaining omniscience (Kevala Jnana) beneath a Sala tree (Shorea robusta). Following a long period of preaching the doctrines of Jainism, he ultimately achieved liberation from the cycle of rebirth (moksha) on the sacred peaks of Mount Shikharji in modern-day Jharkhand.

Sambhavanatha is said to have been born 30 lakh crore sagara after his predecessor, Ajitanatha. His successor, Abhinandananatha, is said to have been born 10 lakh crore sagara after him.

== Iconography ==
In Jain art and sculpture, Sambhavanatha is traditionally depicted in a meditative posture and is distinctly identified by his golden physical complexion. He is explicitly recognized by his unique iconographic emblem, the horse, which is typically carved or stamped onto the pedestal beneath his idols. As with all tirthankaras, he is depicted alongside his dedicated guardian deities (Shashan-devatas). According to both the Digambara and Śvētāmbara traditions, his accompanying male guardian deity (yaksha) is the three-faced Trimukha. However, sectarian texts differ regarding his female guardian (yakshi), with the Digambara sect identifying her as Prajnapti and the Śvētāmbara sect identifying her as Duritari.

== Prayer ==
Svayambhustotra by Acarya Samantabhadra is the adoration of twenty-four tirthankaras. Its five slokas (aphorisms) adore the qualities of Sambhavanātha.

O Lord Sambhavanātha! The worldly life appears to be transient, without a protector, sullied with the blemishes of pride and delusion, and tormented by birth, old-age and death. You had helped worldly souls attain ambrosial happiness by ridding these of the karmic dirt.

— Svayambhustotra (3-2-12)

== Temples and legacy ==
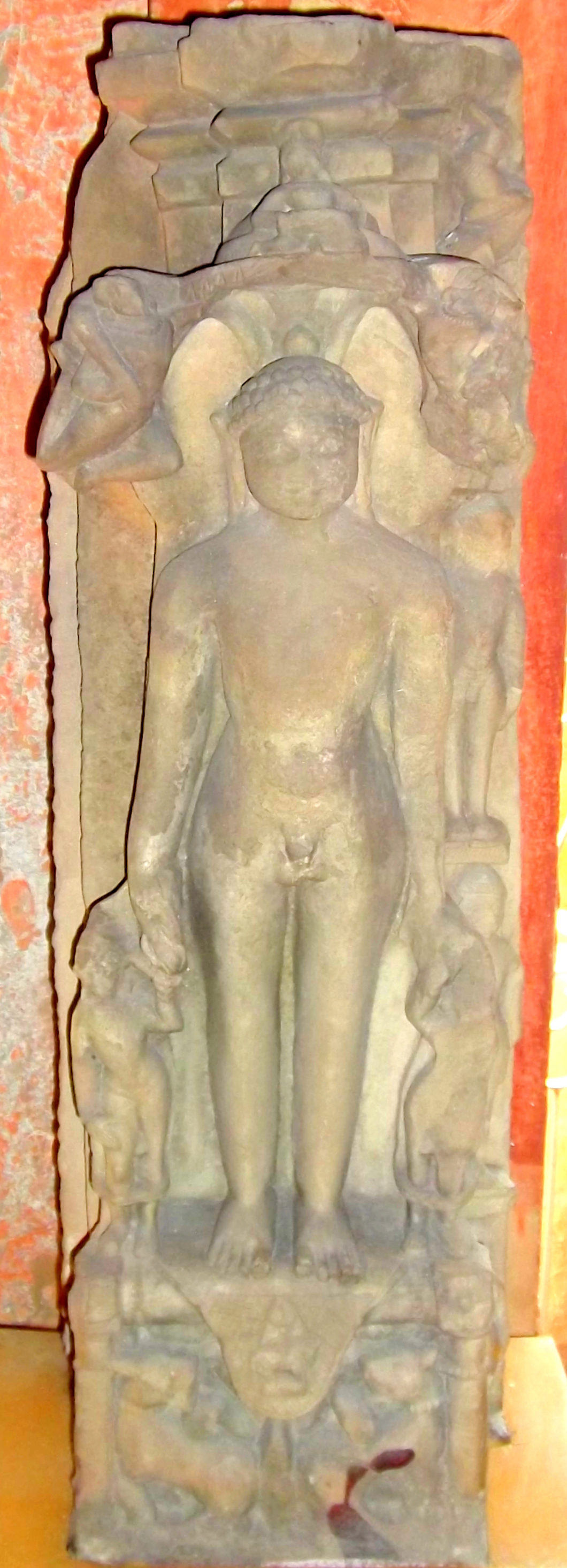
Image of Sambhavnatha, third tirthankara, at Gujari Mahal Archaeological Museum

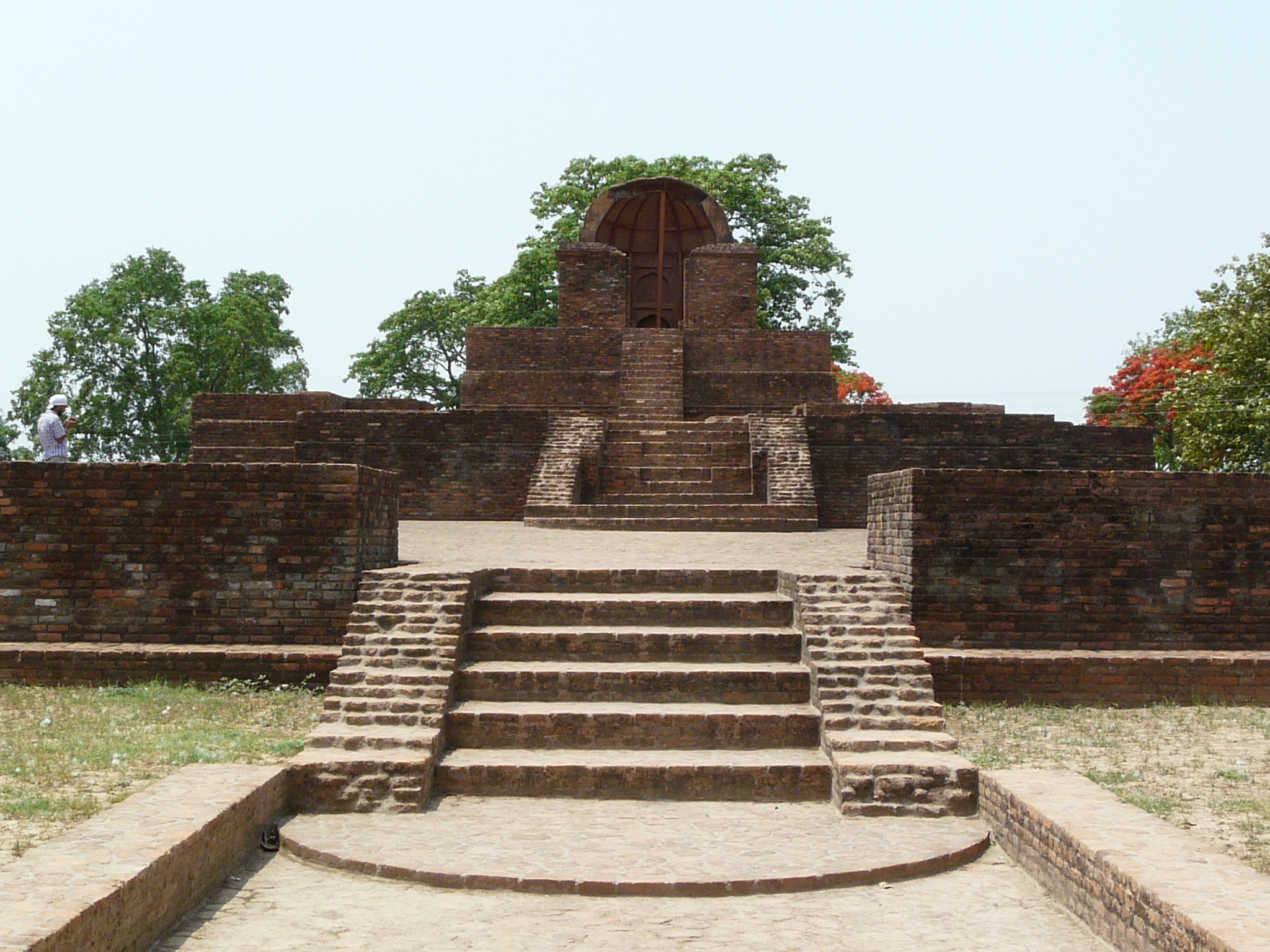
Ruins Shobhnath temple, Shravasti, believed to be birthplace of Sambhavanatha

As the third tirthankara, Sambhavanatha is venerated across the Indian subcontinent, resulting in the establishment of several prominent historical and archaeological sites dedicated to his worship.

=== Places of birth and liberation ===
The ancient city of Shravasti in Uttar Pradesh, traditionally identified in Jain universal history as his royal birthplace, serves as a primary geographic epicenter for his devotion. Within this region, the archaeological ruins of the ancient Shobhnath temple are widely recognized by both historians and devotees as the foundational shrine commemorating his early life and renunciation.

In Jainism, Sammed Shikharji (located on Parasnath Hill in Jharkhand) serves as the geographical location where 20 of the 24 tirthankaras attained liberation. According to Jain texts, Sambhavanatha attained ultimate spiritual liberation at this site alongside 1,000 other ascetic monks. The specific hilltop shrine (tonk) dedicated to his liberation is known as Dhaval Koot. Instead of a traditional idol, this tonk enshrines his footprints (charan), which are actively worshipped by pilgrims from both the Digambara and Śvētāmbara sects.

=== Other temples ===
In western India, his worship is marked by significant architectural monuments, including the historic Sambhavanatha Temple situated in Idar, Gujarat. Furthermore, prominent shrine dedications to him are located within the ancient complex of Ranthambore Fort in Rajasthan, serving as vital spiritual nodes for the regional Jain diaspora.

In southern India, the Chaturmukha Basadi, Gerusoppa, Karnataka, stands as a premier 16th-century stone monument that prominently features his veneration.

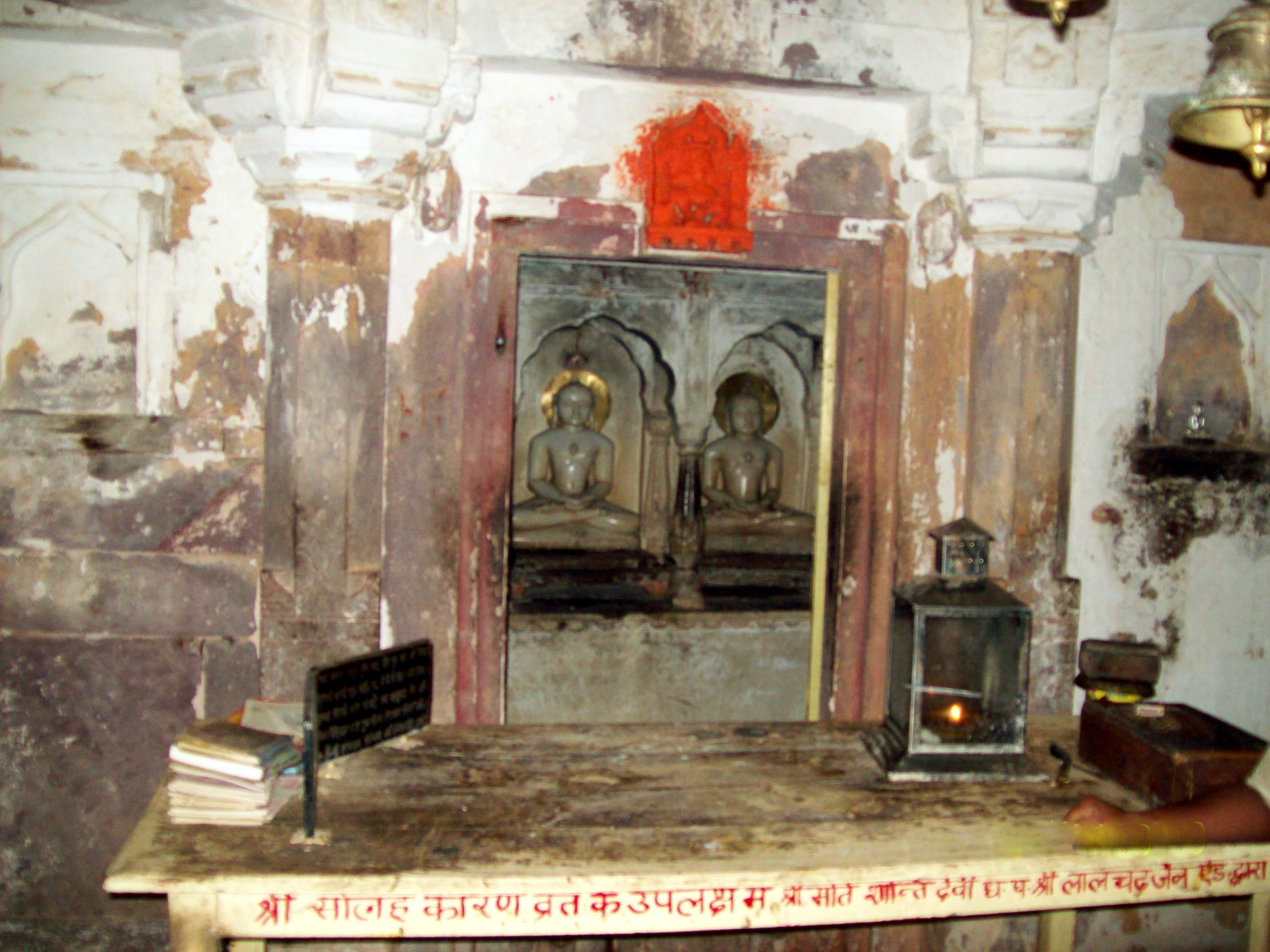
Lord Sumatinatha and Lord Sambhavnatha at Ranthambore Fort

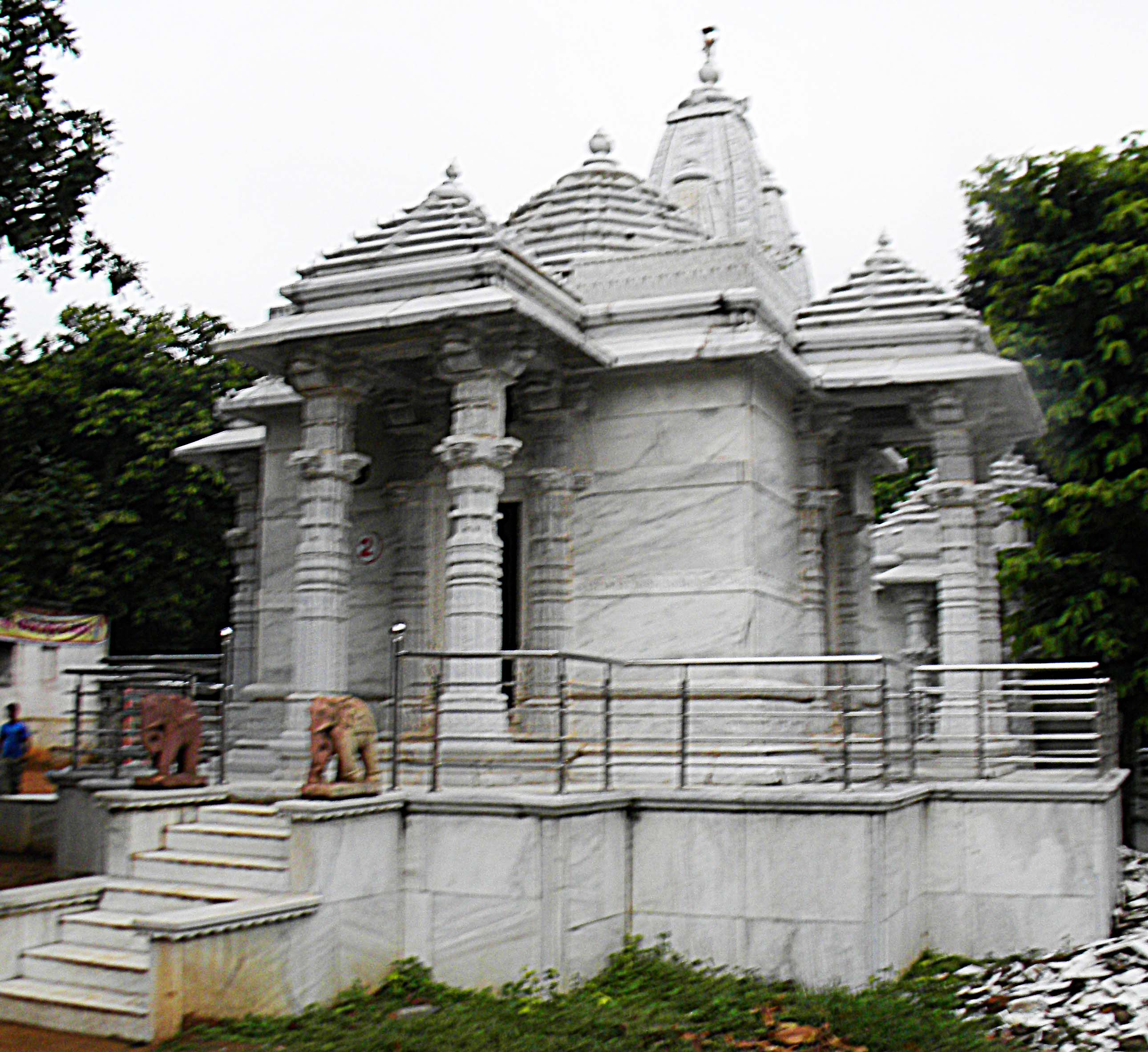
Sambhabnath Temple, Madhuban

== See also ==
- God in Jainism
- Arihant (Jainism)
- Jainism and non-creationism
