= Shravasti =

Historical city in Uttar Pradesh, India

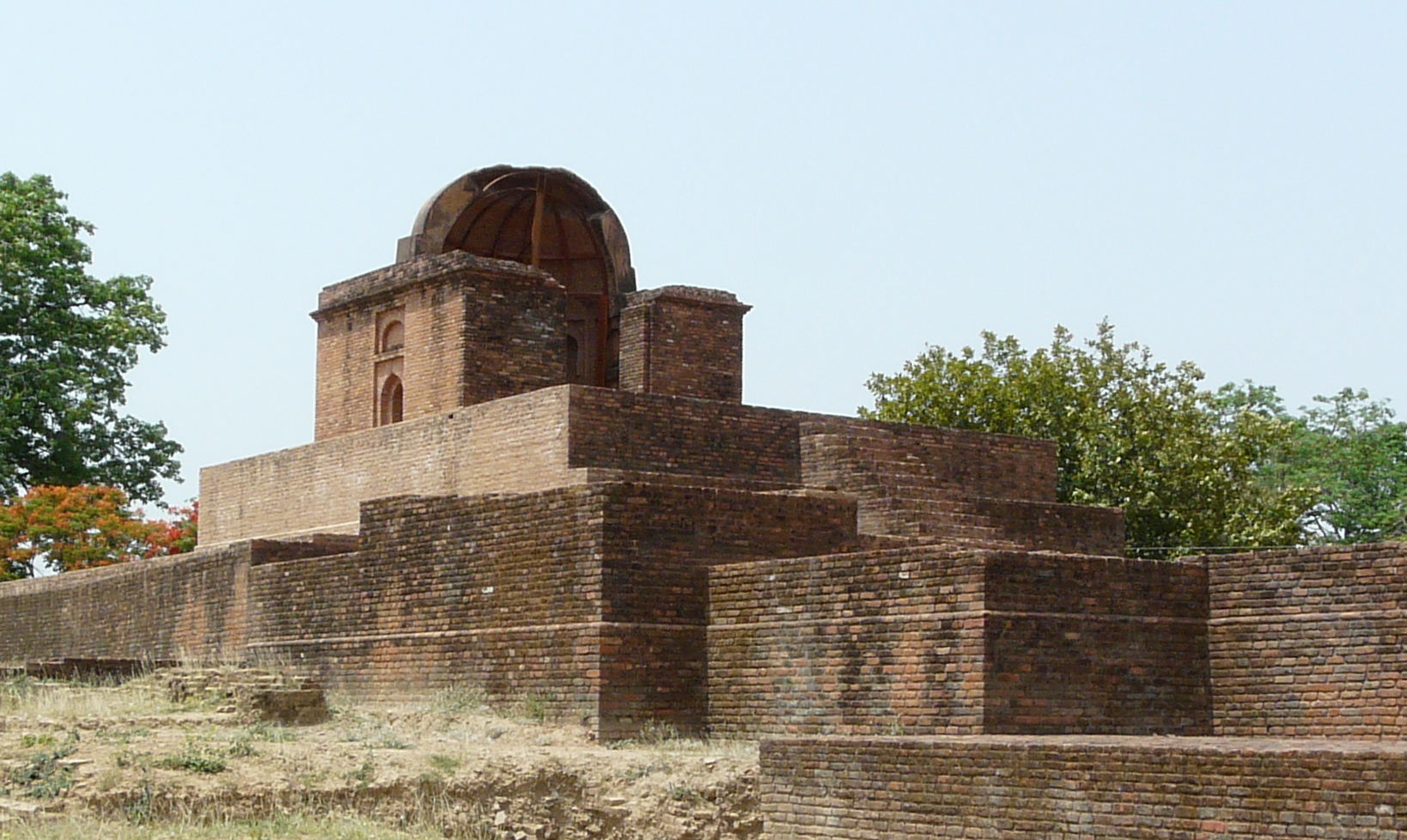
- A temple of Jain tirthankara Sambhavanatha, Shravasti

- Location within Uttar Pradesh Location within India
- 27°31′1.5″N 82°3′2.2″E
- Location: Uttar Pradesh, India

Site notes
- Area: Shravasti district

Translations of Shravasti
- Sanskrit: श्रावस्ती (IAST: Śrāvastī)
- Pali: 𑀲𑀸𑀯𑀢𑁆𑀣𑀻 (Sāvatthī)
- Burmese: သာဝတ္ထိမြို့
- Chinese: 舍衛城/舍卫城 (Pinyin: Shěwèichéng)
- Indonesian: Sawati
- Japanese: 舎衛城 (Rōmaji: Shaeijō)
- Korean: 슈라바스티 (RR: Syurapaseuti)
- Sinhala: ශ්‍රාවස්තී
- Tamil: சிராவஸ்தி
- Tibetan: མཉན་ཡོད་ (mnyam yod)
- Thai: สาวัตถี
- Vietnamese: Xá-vệ

Shravasti (Sanskrit: श्रावस्ती, IAST: Śrāvastī; Pali: 𑀲𑀸𑀯𑀢𑁆𑀣𑀻, romanized: Sāvatthī) is a town in Shravasti district in Indian state of Uttar Pradesh. It was the capital of the ancient Indian kingdom of Kosala, where the Buddha lived most after his enlightenment. It is near the Rapti river in the northeastern part of Uttar Pradesh India, close to the Nepalese border.

Shravasti is one of the most revered sites in Buddhism. It is believed to be where the Buddha taught many of his Suttas (sermons), converted many of his famous disciples, and performed his "Sravasti miracles" – "great miracle" and "twin miracle" – a subject of numerous historic reliefs, statues and literature in Buddhism. Sravasti is also important to Hinduism and Jainism. The earliest manuscripts of both mention it and weave some of their legends in Sravasti. Archaeological excavations of the Sravasti site have unearthed numerous artworks and monuments related to Buddhism, Hinduism and Jainism.

Shravasti, as a capital, was at the junction of three major trading routes in ancient India, connecting it to the different regions of the Indian subcontinent. Inscribed slabs and statues found at and near Sravasti suggest it was an active Buddhist site and prosperous area from the time of the Buddha (c. 5th-century BCE) through at least the 12th-century CE. It was destroyed and covered with mounds sometime in or after the 13th-century, chronologically marking the arrival and establishment of the Delhi Sultanate. Excavations between 1986 and 1996, led by Japanese archaeologists, suggest that the site continued to be built up and expanded through the 1st millennium. Thereafter, the discovery of numerous charcoal remains and burnt soil suggests that a large portion of the site was burnt down and damaged, while other parts went into disuse and suffered the effects of erosion.

The Shravasti site was rediscovered by a team of British and Indian archaeologists in late 19th-century. It has attracted waves of systematic excavations from the late 19th-century through the 1990s. It is now a small town, a center of heritage tourism and religious pilgrimage by Buddhists from around the world.

== Location ==
Sravasti and other Buddhist sites

Shravasti (Sravasti) is located in the southern foothills of the Himalayas, now in Shravasti district of Uttar Pradesh. This is a region of many rivers and rivulets. Sravasti is on the banks of West Rapti river (Achiravati) – now a seasonal river that typically dries up in summer. It is about 50 kilometres (31 mi) of Gonda railway and bus hub, and about 170 kilometres (106 mi) north-east of Lucknow airport. It is connected to India's highway network with NH 927, 730 and 330.

Flights at Shravasti Airport will resume from 15 July 2025.

== Nomenclature ==
Shravasti is also referred to as Saheth-Maheth, or sometimes just Sahet-Mahet, in archaeological and historical scholarship. These are two sites separated by less than 2 kilometers. Saheth is smaller and contains the Jetavana monuments. Maheth refers to the walled complex within a much damaged ancient mud fort. The site is most known for its Buddhist monuments, though significant important ruins of old Hindu and Jain temples along with artwork have also been found here. Adjacent to Maheth, to its northwest, are also medieval era Islamic tombs.

The word Shravasti is rooted in Sanskrit and the Hindu tradition. As per Bhagavata Purana this city was built by a king called Shravasta who descended from the Ikshvaku dynasty which originated from the legendary Vaivasvata Manu. In Pali and Buddhist literature, it is called Savatthi. Early Buddhist literature paint Savatthi as a mega-urban center in the time of the Buddha. The 5th-century Buddhist commentator and philosopher Buddhaghosa, living some 900 years after the death of the Buddha, states that there were 5.7 million residents in Savatthi. This is implausible and likely a gross exaggeration based on the Buddhist oral traditions. Yet, it also reflects a community memory of Shravasti as a prosperous large capital. In Ajivika and Jaina literature, the same Kosala capital is called Saravana, Kunalnagari and Chandrikapuri. As Saravana, this site is considered the birthplace of Gosala Mankhaliputta.

== History ==
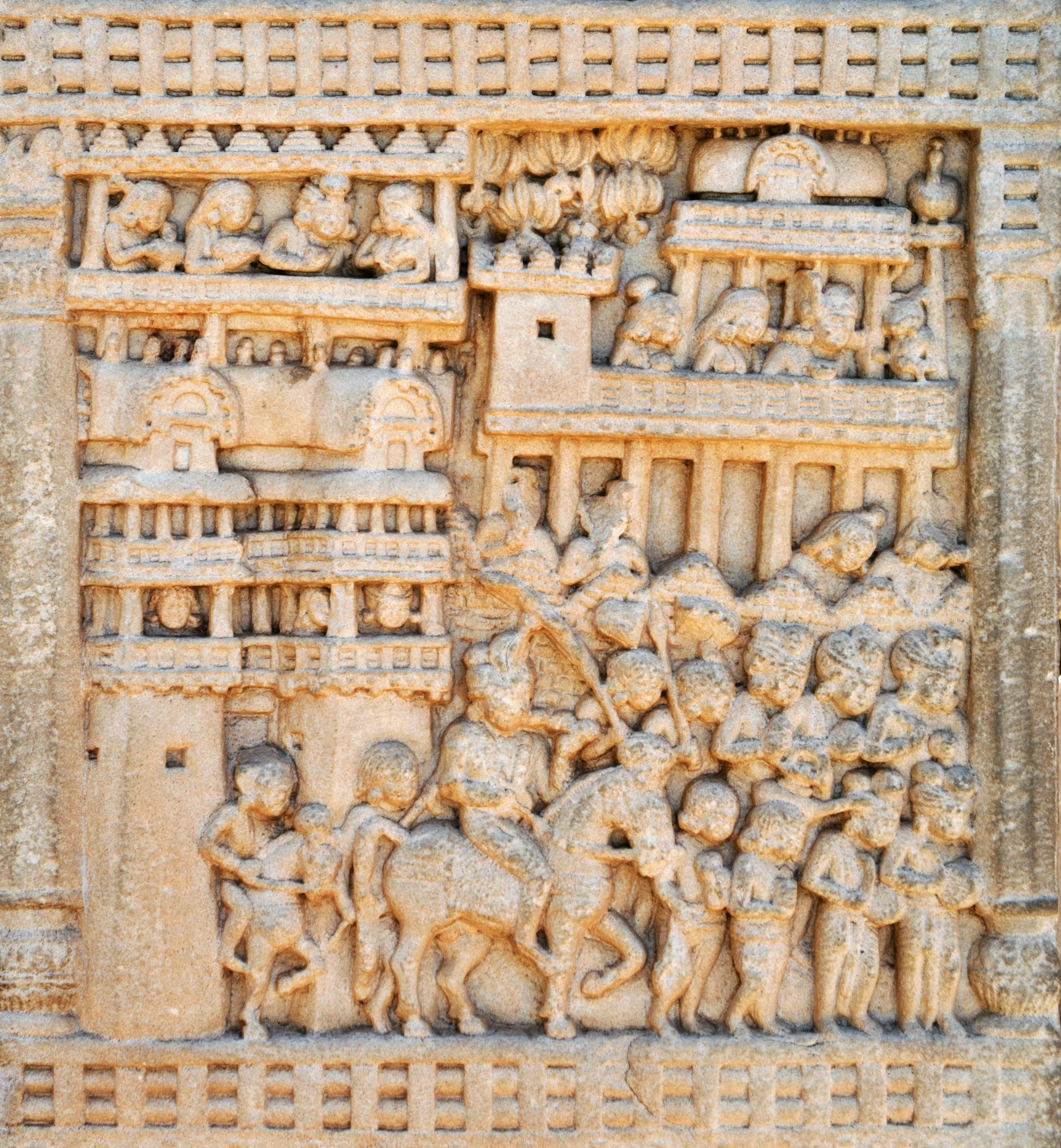
Procession of Prasenajit of Kosala leaving Sravasti to meet the Buddha. Sanchi.

The ancient Shravasti is found in the literature of all major Indian religions. Of these, the Buddhist sources are most extensive. It is also described in more historical records such as those left by the Chinese pilgrims to India.

=== Buddhist sources ===
Shravasti is the location where the Buddha gave most of his talks, later remembered by his followers and centuries later written down as Suttas. According to Woodward, 871 suttas in the four Nikayas of Buddhist canons, are based in Shravasti. These texts add that the Buddha spent twenty-five varshas in Shravasti. (Note: A varsha is a monastic retreat during the monsoon rainy season in India, traditionally observed by Buddhist, Hindu and Jaina monks.) Scholars such as Rhys Davids state that this could mean two things. Either the Buddha primarily lived in Shravasti after his enlightenment, or that the oral tradition in early Buddhism was "systematized in Shravasti". Malalasekera, a historian of Buddhism, considers the former more likely. Either way, Shravasti is the key site where almost all the remembered teachings of the Buddha were either heard or compiled, and centuries later were recorded as the Pali canon elsewhere. (Note: The Buddha did not exclusively give his sermons in Shravasti. The other major locations included Vaishali, Rajagriha and Benares (Kashi, Varanasi). There are an additional 77 minor locations, likely rural or small towns of ancient India.)

Shravasti is also mentioned as the capital and home of king Prasenajit – where the royal patron of the Buddha lived. It was also the home of Anathapindada – the richest early donor for the Buddha. Anathapindada is famous in the Buddhist literature as the one who offered his Jetavana grove and residences.

In the Buddhist tradition, the Buddha is remembered for having performed miracles, of which two are particularly popular in reliefs found in its stupas, artwork and literature. The Buddha is believed to have performed the Mahapratiharya or the "great miracle", and the Yamakapratiharya or the "twin miracle" in Shravasti. These are called the "Sravasti miracles". (Note: These miracles are claims to the supra-normal powers of the Buddha as a enlightened being. In the Yamakapratiharya event, as remembered in the earliest Buddhist texts, the Buddha "rose in the air while emitting water and fire from his body"; In the Mahapratiharya event, the Buddha creates "numerous replicas of himself that simultaneously appear everywhere in the terrestrial and celestial abodes". These miracles are carved in Buddhist artwork found in earliest sites in Gandhara, Krishna river valley and outside India. Similar miracles are attributed to revered figures in other religions.)

=== Jaina sources ===
Śrāvasti is often mentioned in Jaina sources. It is also called Chandrapuri, Savatthi, Savasti, Sharavati, Dharmapuri, Champakpuri, Pushkalavati, Kunalnagar, Chandrikapuri, and Ārya Kṣetra, because Jaina texts state that two of their Tirthankaras were born here millions of years ago, in prehistoric times – Sambhavanatha (3rd of 24) and Chandraprabha (8th of 24). Śrāvasti is also known as the capital city of Kunala's kingdom. Paumachariyam, the oldest Jaina version of the Ramayana, also mentions Śrāvasti to be the birthplace of Sambhavanatha. Ancient parts of Śrāvasti, which were also known as Sahet - Mahet, also had several grand temples and fortifications. Sambhavanatha is said to have had taken initiation, donated all his belongings, and broken his first fast in Śrāvasti after begging for alms from King Surendradatta. Munisuvrataswami, the 20th Tirthankara, visited Śrāvasti and initiated several members of the royal family. As per the Śvetāmbara Jaina text Jnatadharmakathah, Parshvanatha, the 23rd Tirthankara, also visited Śrāvasti and inspired several lay-followers to accept initiation. Shantinatha, the 16th Tirthankara, also visited this town. Kapila, a Jaina ascetic, achieved nirvana at Śrāvasti. Jaina sources also mention it to be the kingdom of Lava and Kusha, the sons of Rama.

According to Jaina texts, Mahavira visited Śrāvasti many times and spent his 10th varsha (monsoon season) here before attaining omniscience. He was hosted by a wealthy merchant named Nandinipriya. Mahavira also faced numerous ordeals during his stay. Bṛhaḍkalpa Sutra, a Śvetāmbara Jaina text, also mentions the installation of several jeevit-swami idols of Mahavira, the 24th Tirthankara. Further, Śrāvasti is the place of the bitter arguments and meeting between Mahavira, and Gosala Mankhaliputta – the founder of Ajivikas and a rival. Mahavira had several disciples in Śrāvasti. After Mahavira attained omniscience, Gosala Mankhaliputta attacked him using his tejoleśyā here. After a 6-month long bleeding episode, Mahavira was treated by Revathi Śrāvikā who used Bijorā Pāk medicine to cure him. It was also the birthplace of two of the 11 ganadharas of Mahavira and of Jamāli, Mahavira's son-in-law. Ancient Jaina scholars such as Maghavan and Keshi studied in Śrāvasti. At Śrāvasti, Jamāli created the first of the eight heretical sects by opposing tenets of Jainism as taught by Mahavira himself. The eighth heretical sect, Digambara sect, was created by Sivabhuti at Rathavirapur. As described in the Jaina text Uttaradhyayana Sutra, the discussion between Keśiśramanācharya and Mahavira's first disciple, Gautama Swami, is said to have had taken place at Śrāvasti. This was the place where Upkeśa Gaccha was established by Keśiśramanācharya after he accepted Mahavira's conduct and became a white-clad monk along with all his disciples who were initially following Parshvanatha's conduct of brown-colored clothes. Moreover, the Pattavali described in the Kalpa Sūtra, states the existence of Śrāvastikā Śākhā, one of the four branches of the Veṣavāṭikgaṇa of the Jaina sangha. It had originated from Ācārya Kāmardhi, a disciple of Ācārya Suhastisuri who was himself a disciple of Ācārya Sthulabhadrasuri, belonging to the beginning of the 3rd century BCE. Apart from these scriptures, Śrāvasti is also mentioned in other Śvetāmbara Jaina scriptures such as Sthananga Sutra, Vyākhyāprajñapti, and Āvaśyaka Sūtra. It is also mentioned in the Ajit-Śānti Stava.

In the 9th and 10th century CE, several kings such as Mayurdhwaja, Hansadhwaja, Makardhwaja, Sudhadhwaja, and Suhyadhwaja of Śrāvasti patronized Jainism. Ācārya Jinaprabhasuri, in his Vividha Tirtha Kalpa confirms that a Jaina temple with an image of Sambhavanatha was renovated multiple times until it was finally completely desecrated during the reign of Alauddin Khilji. Despite numerous invasions, ruins of 17 temples survive. In their pilgrimage memoirs, Jaina monks Saubhagyavijaya (17th century CE) and Vijayasagara (18th century CE) describe it as an important site of pilgrimage for Jainas. Between 1975 and 1987, major restoration works under Ācārya Bhadrankarasuri, a Śvetāmbara Jaina monk, were performed and several temples and statues were restored for worshipping.

Currently, the birthplace of Sambhavanatha is under the care of Archaeological Survey of India where remains of several temples are found. It was rebuilt in the 12th century CE as its architecture features Iranian influence. 5 idols dating back to the 11th century CE were also found during excavations. A saptatrithi twin idol, with Tirthankaras in the Kayotsarga posture was also excavated. 24 Tirthankaras idols from different time periods were also excavated from the archaeological site. Out of these, 2 idols are dated back to the pre-Mauryan period, around 300 BCE.

=== Hindu sources ===
The king of Kosala who patronized the Buddhism, Jainism and Ajivikas in his kingdom, performed Vedic rituals. He sponsored many Vedic schools. In these and others ways, Shravasti is mentioned in numerous Hindu texts. The Buddhist and Jain texts corroborate the presence of numerous Brahmanas (scholars) and Vedic teachers in Shravasti. They are presented as debating ideas, with Buddhist sources showing the ideas of the Buddha to be superior, while Jaina sources showing the ideas of the Tirthankaras as superior, both mocking all the other sides. In Hindu texts such as their epics, Sravasti is claimed to have been founded by a Vedic king named Sravasta (or Sravastaka), himself the son of king Srava. The ancient is extensively mentioned both in the Ramayana and the Mahabharata. Numerous later Hindu texts such as the Harsha-charita and Kathasarit-sagara, base some of their legends in Shravasti.

=== Chinese pilgrims ===
The Chinese Pilgrim Fa-Hein travelled to India about 399 CE, and stayed for about 10 years in his quest to learn Sanskrit and obtain original Buddhist texts. He mentions Sravasti, and describes how he reached Kapilavastu from Sravasti. The hints and scenes mentioned by Faxian were one of the basis of an early colonial-era incorrect conjecture on the current location of historic Kapilavastu – the birthplace of Buddha.

Xuanzang describes the country of Shravasti in Fascicle 6 of his travelogue Dà Táng Xīyù Jì. In this fascicle, he presents four countries including Shravasti, and describes the villages and towns in the region as deserted and dilapidated. He says the Shravasti country is over six thousand li in circuit with a capital city that is desolate, though some residents still live here. He mentions it has over hundred monasteries, many dilapidated. In these monasteries, Buddhist monks study Hinayana Buddhism (now called Sravakayana, Xuanzang belonged to the Mahayana Buddhism tradition).

He saw the decaying remains of Prasenajit's palace, then to its east the Great Dhamma Hall stupa, another stupa and a temple for the maternal aunt of the Buddha. Next to these, states Xuanzang, is the great stupa of Angulimala. About five li (~2 kilometers in the 7th century) south of the city, he saw the Jetavana garden with two 70 feet high pillars standing in front of a dilapidated monastery. One great pillar has a wheel carved at its top, the other a bull. Xuanzang visits and chronicles all the monuments associated with the Sravasti legends with the Buddha. He also visited a Buddhist temple 60 feet high with a seated Buddha image in Shravasti, and a deva temple about the same size as the Buddha temple, both in good condition. Over sixty li to the northwest of Sravasti capital, he saw a series of stupas built by Ashoka for Kasyapa Buddha.

== Archaeological site ==
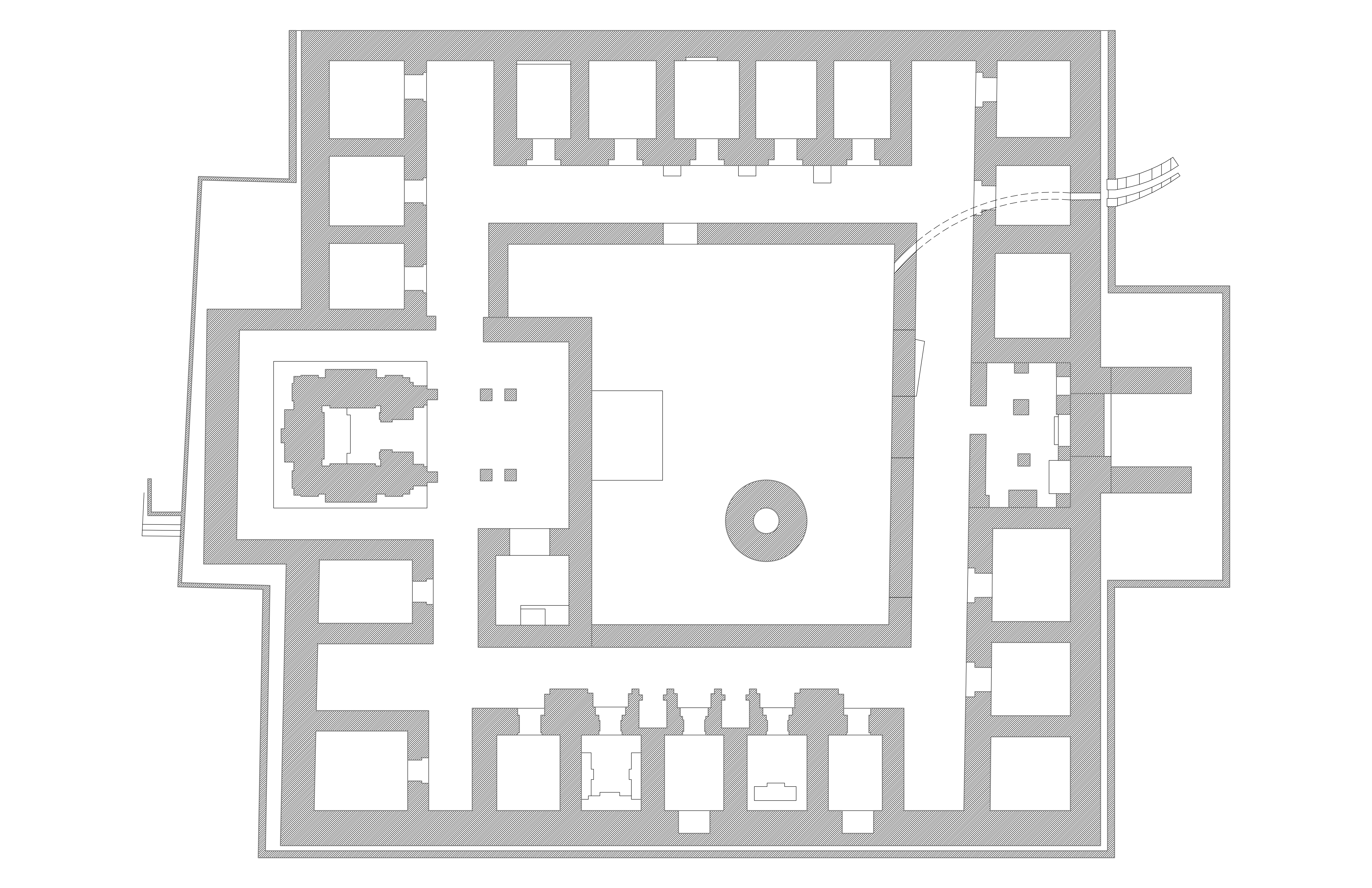
Floor plan of one of the excavated ancient Shravasti monuments.

The Shravasti archaeological site, also called the Saheth–Maheth site, is to the south of Rapti river. It is surrounded with ruined massive walls about 60 feet high, built about the 3rd-century BCE. These walls become visible from far as one approaches the site. Approaching from Lucknow, after the walls, a right turn takes one to the Maheth site, while the Saheth site with Jetavana monastery is further ahead about half a kilometer away. Further ahead, to the north is the seasonal Rapti river which likely has changed it course over the last 2000 years. The Nepalese Himalayan foothills frame the view to the north.

The Shravasti archaeological site and its potential importance was first identified by the British archaeologist Alexander Cunningham in 1863. At that time, the site was two significant mounds, as well as monuments whose stones and bricks were partly visible and covered with vegetation, all inside the massive ancient wall ruins. Scholars of his time were debating competing candidate locations in India and Nepal for the "ancient site of Shravasti", largely based on the travelogues of Chinese pilgrims. Cunningham linked this site with a colossal Bodhisattva image found nearby with early Kushana era inscription. He also measured and published a pretty detailed map for both Saheth and Maheth.

Excavations from 1876 through 1910s

Cunningham led the first clean up and partial excavation of Shravasti in 1876. This successfully revealed the stupas and small shrines, but these were of a later date. This renewed the debate of whether Cunningham's proposal was correct and where the real Shravasti is. About a decade later, in 1885, Hoey completed a more extensive excavations, but these were also partial. The most significant discovery of Hoey was a Vihara complex with an inscribed stone dated year 1176 in the Vikram era (early 12th-century CE). This established that Shravasti was an active Buddhist site through at least the 12th century, but also confirmed that one of the stupa here was named Jetavana vihara. Around 1908, Vogel led more thorough archaeological excavations here and this confirmed for the first time that the Sahet-Mahet site was indeed the ancient Sravasti much revered in historic Buddhist texts. In 1910, Marshall and Sahni led another expanded excavation and discovered more monuments here. All of these excavations yielded increasing amounts of ancient stupas, temples, sculptures, inscriptions, coins, seals and terracottas. These also confirmed and resonated with most of the sites mentioned in Buddhist texts such as the Chinese pilgrim's records. Yet, all of these monuments and items found during the excavations were from the 1st century CE or after.

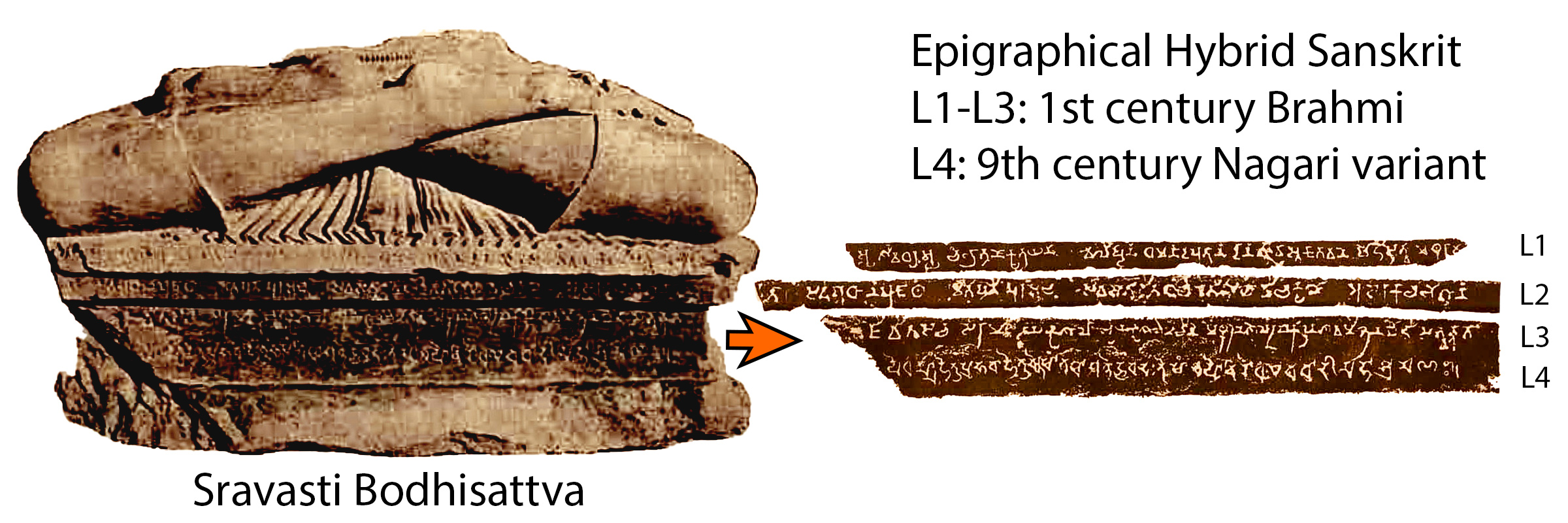
Inscribed life-sized Shravasti Bodhisattva statue found by Marshall and Sahni in 1910. The Hybrid Sanskrit text above is inscribed in 1st-century Brahmi script and 9th-century Nagari script. It is one of the many inscriptions that establish that Shravasti was an active Buddhist site till at least the 12th-century CE. The other notable part in this inscription is that two brothers declare themselves to be of kshatriya caste before making this gift of the Boddhisattva statue.

Excavation in 1950s

In 1959, Sinha led another series of excavations at Shravasti, particularly near the fort walls of Sahet-Mahet. This yielded evidence that the walls were built and repaired in three periods, ranging between the 3rd-century BCE to about 1st-century CE. The deeper layers also yielded wares with graffiti, jewelry, short sections inscribed in Brahmi script, as well as terracotta figures of mother goddess, a Naga and several plaques of Mithuna figures (Kama, eros-scenes common in Hindu temples).

Excavations in 1980s and 1990s

Between 1986 and 1996, Japanese archaeologists led by Yoshinori Aboshi completed nine seasons of archaeological excavations in and around the Sravasti site, this time with carbon dating. They reported that the ancient city was surrounded by an earthen rampart with a circumference of about 5.2 kilometers, in a crescent shape (likely along the ancient river) and was spread over 160 hectares. In addition to the wider area, the Japanese team excavated much deeper layers than prior efforts. They report that the layers and items they uncovered from Sravasti are from 8th-century BCE through all of the 1st millennium CE, with large scale monastery construction after the Kushana Empire era.

The 1986–1996 excavations efforts brought to light a previously unknown, large scale bathing tank (almost square in plan, about 25 meters on one side), another large caitya complex, four new stupas, and other monuments. It also yielded evidence that many Sravasti monuments suffered repeated damage from floods between the 1st and 10th-century, the residents of Sravasti attempted to rebuild some of the monuments several times. The later structures largely and increasingly followed a highly symmetric square plan architecture; for example, a later monastic complex had a square platform, with 28 vihara cells each 2.6 meter square. This structure was built from a mix of bricks and wood, and the excavation process discovered a thick layer of charcoal on top of this large platform. An analysis affirmed that this structure was burnt down, and thereafter completely abandoned by the monks as the combustion products were undisturbed. About 100 meters away from this burnt down site, they discovered another large caitya complex which was also covered with a thick layer of charcoal and combustion residue of the same age. Similar observations across many spots, separated by significant distances, suggests that the Buddhist monastic complexes of Sravasti were likely burnt down at the same time. Further, the carbon dating suggests that the structures in Sravasti were largely built from 1st-century CE through most of the Gupta period. The layers suggest that the monasteries and the city went through a period of stagnation and decline about the 5th century and then expanded again from 7th-century onwards through the 12th-century, then they were burnt down.

The most important finds through the various excavations include:

- Buddhist stupas, monasteries and artwork dating through the 12th century, the stupa and vihara locations are mostly consistent with the Chinese pilgrimage records (the different Chinese pilgrims left inconsistent records)
- Hindu artwork, including a large number of Ramayana panels and deity artwork
- Jaina temple and artwork (now called Shobhnath temple)

Outside of Shravasti is located the stupa where the Buddha performed the Twin Miracle (Pali:Yamaka-pātihāriya).

At the current complex, managed by ASI, many monuments can be seen including the Angulimala's stupa, Anathapindika's stupa, and the Shobhanatha temple. There is an old temple dedicated to a Jain Tirthankara Sambhavanatha, which Jains believe is the site where he was born in pre-historic times.

== Contemporary Shravasti ==
The site of Jetavana monastery is the main pilgrim destination, with meditation and chanting mainly done at the Gandhakuti (Buddha's hut) and the Anandabodhi tree. Buddhist monasteries from the following countries have been constructed at Shravasti: Thailand, South Korea, Sri Lanka, Myanmar, Tibet, and China.

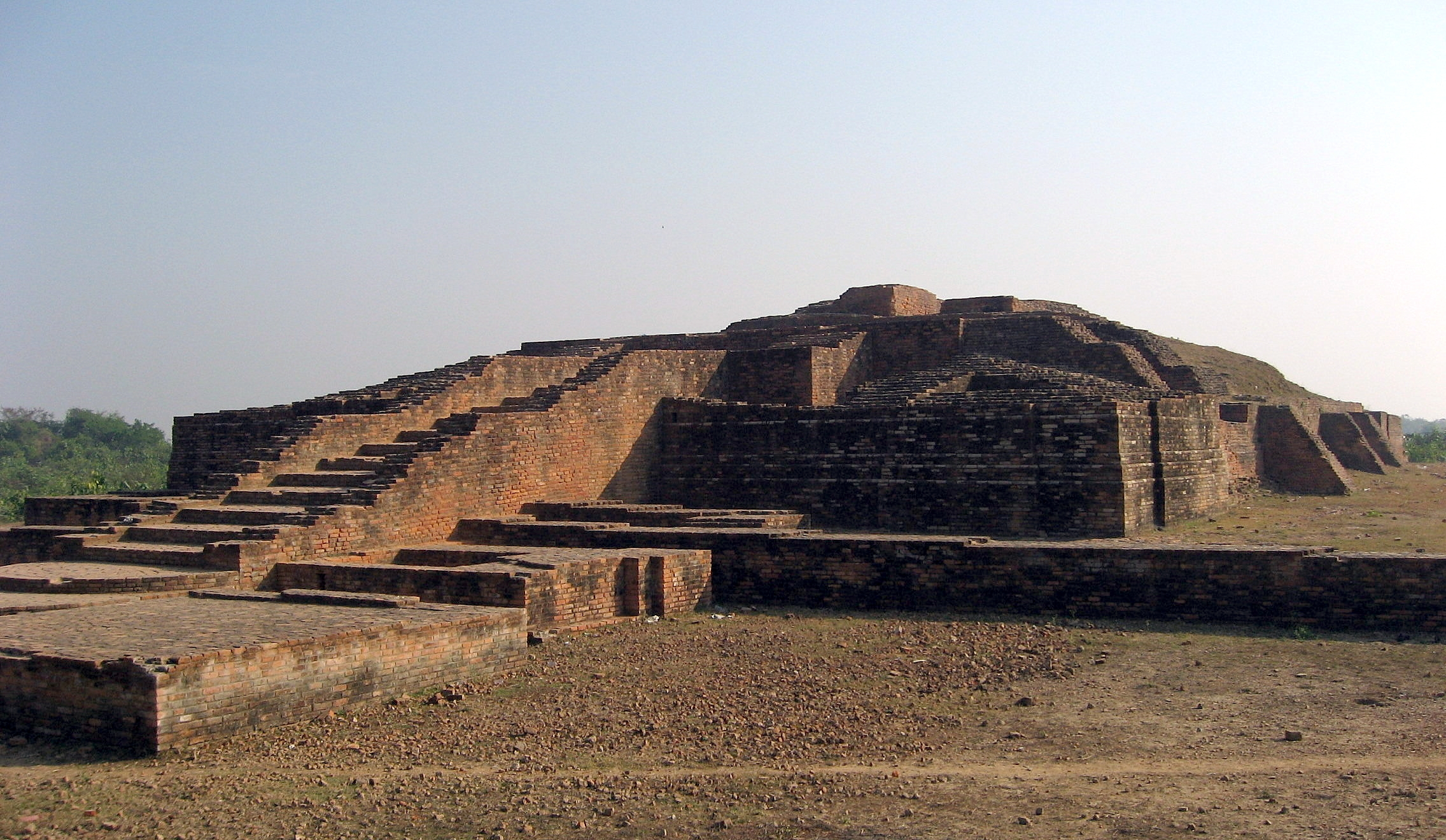
Anathapindika's Stupa in Shravasti

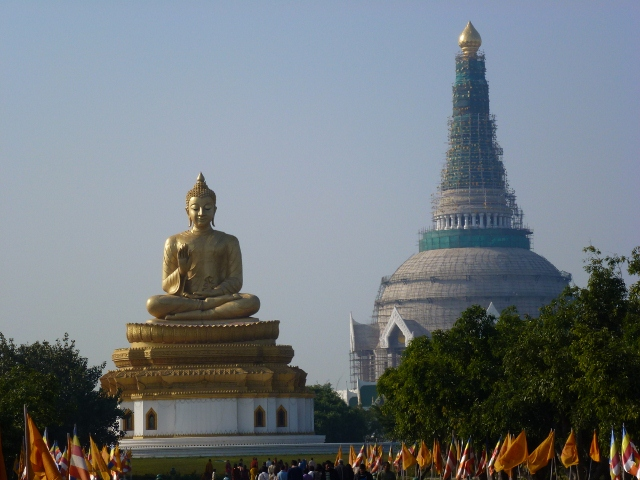
Buddha's Statue in Shrawasti

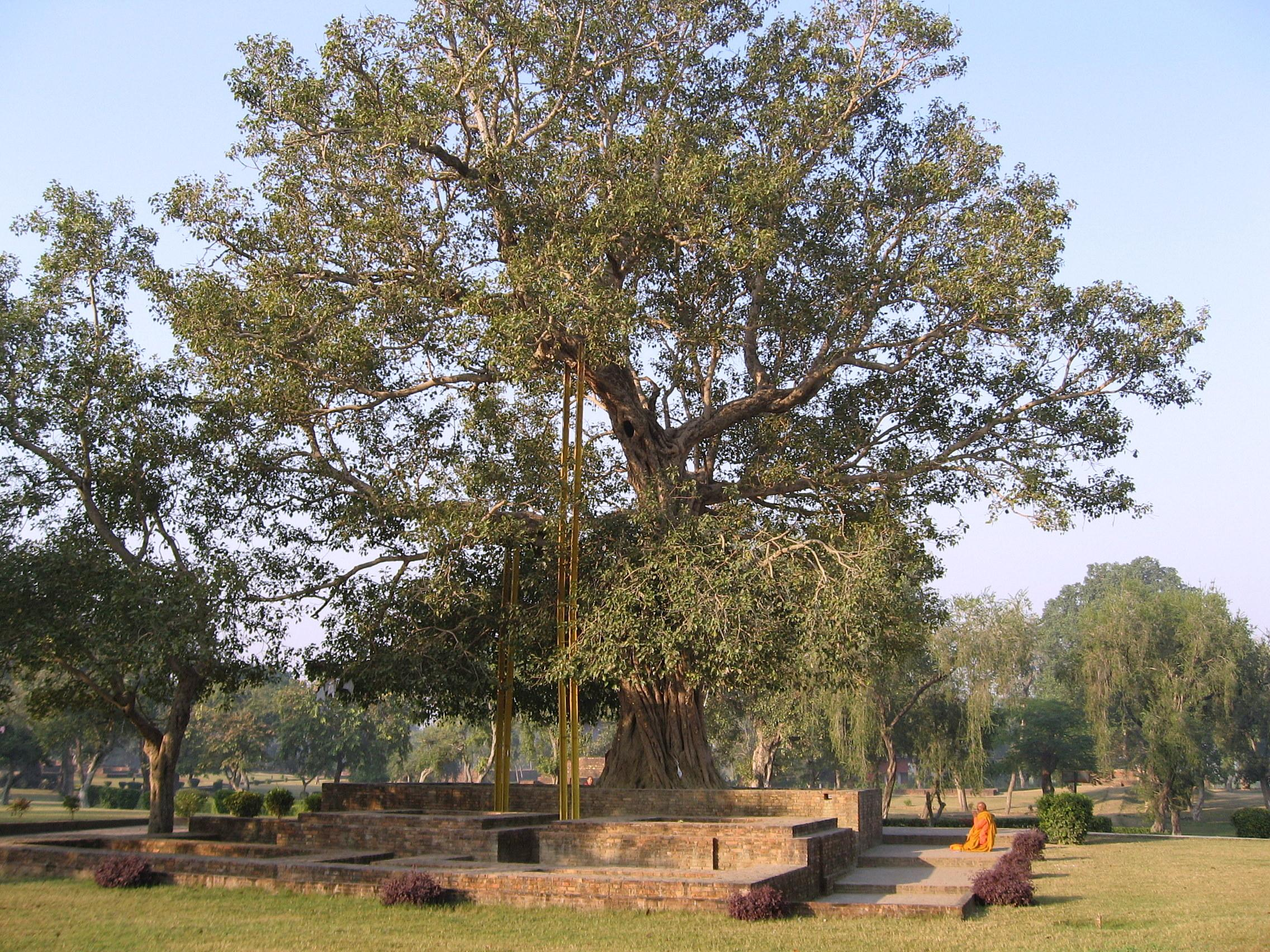
Anandabodhi tree in Jetavana monastery.

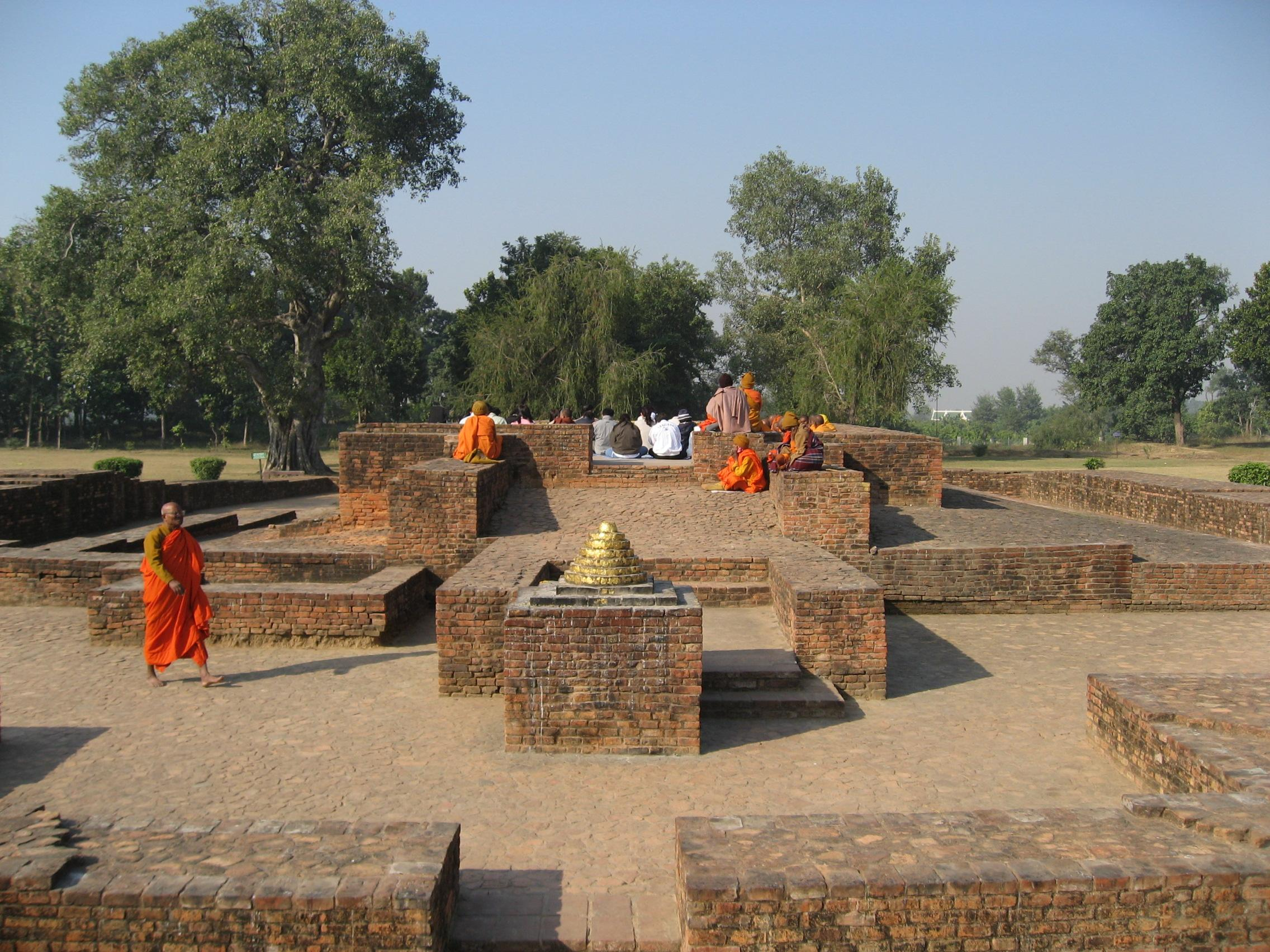
Gandhakuti (Buddha's hut) in Jetavana.

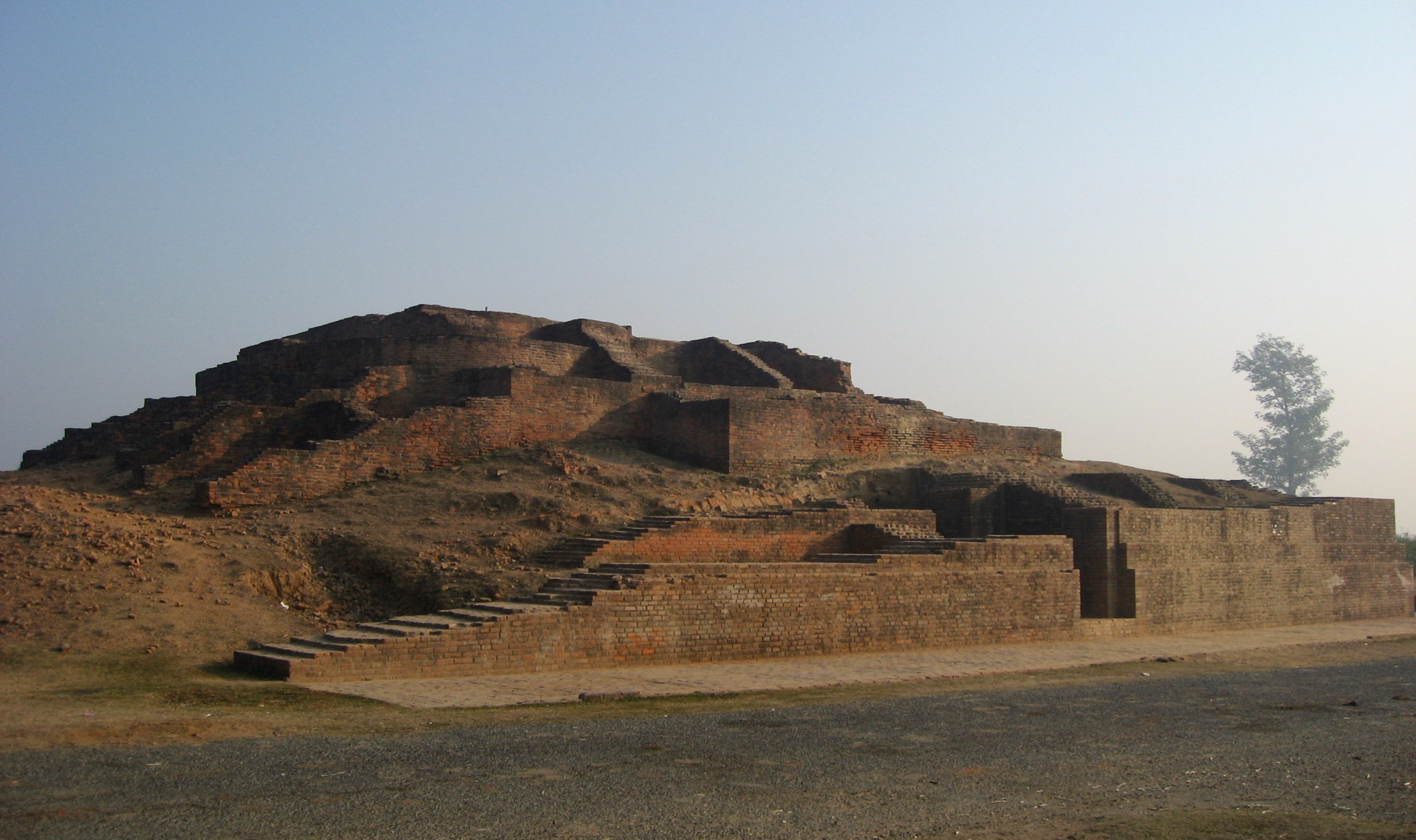
Stupa of Angulimala.

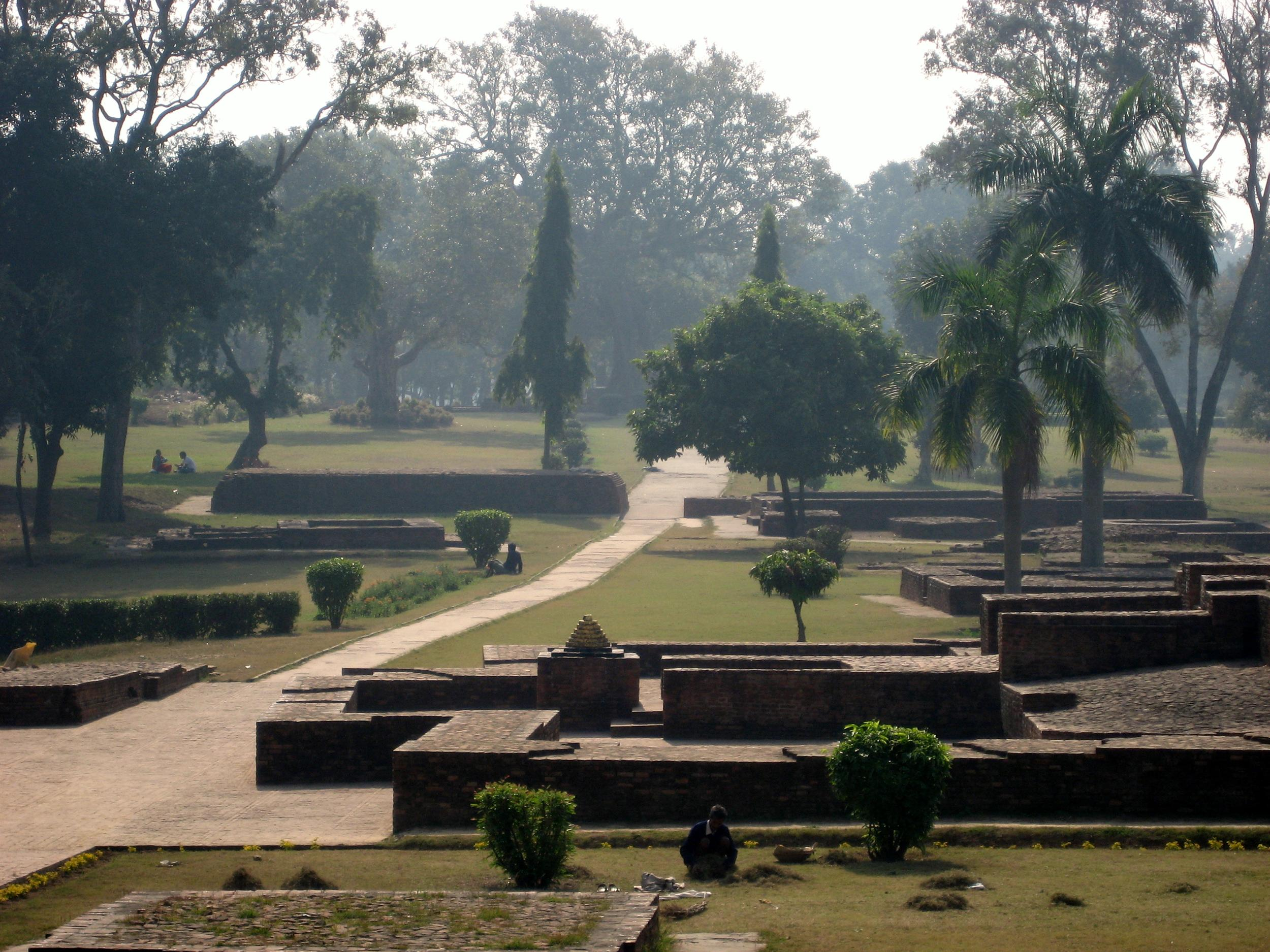
Scene in Jetavana.

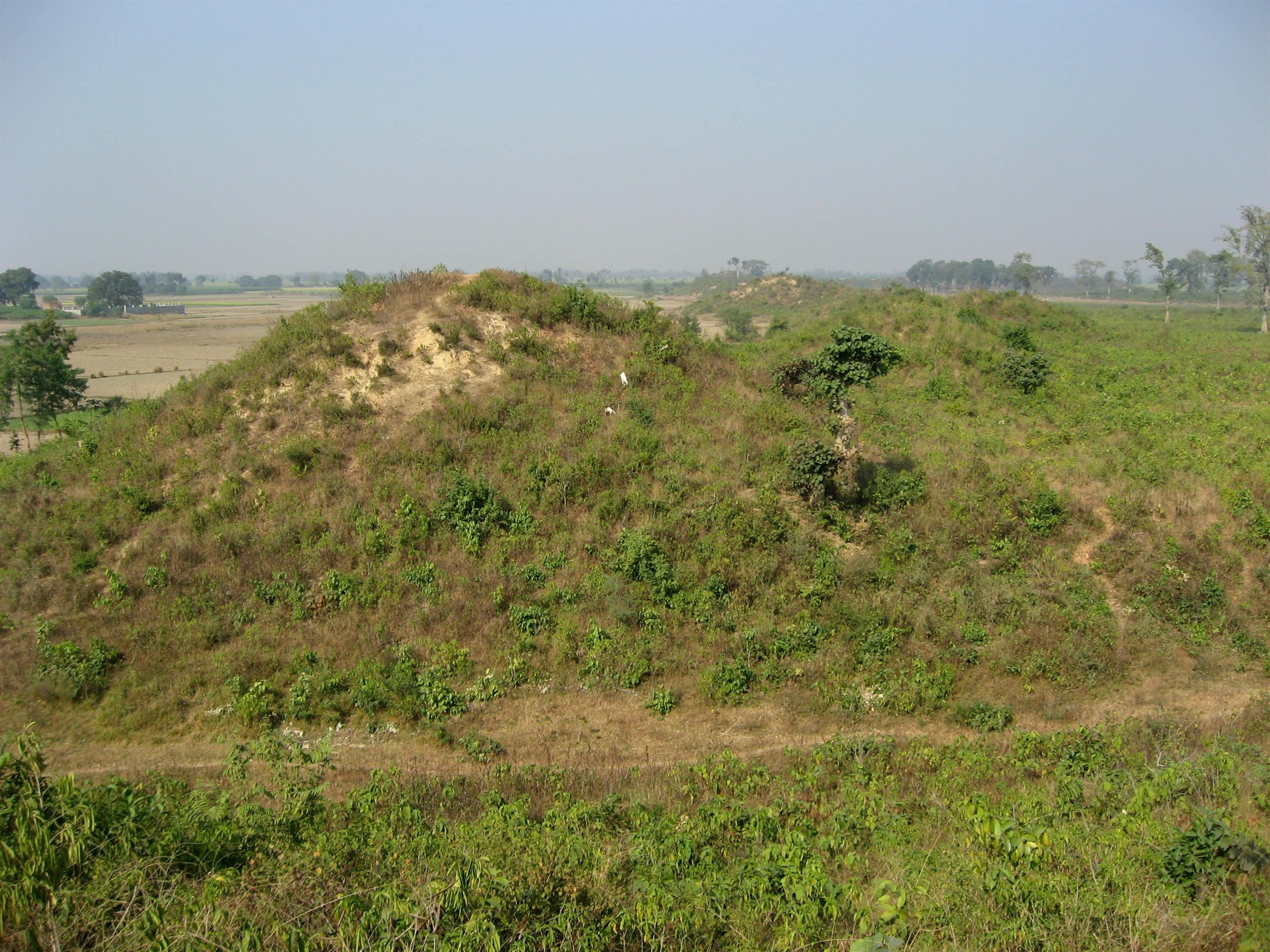
City walls of Shravasti, with the ancient city gate.

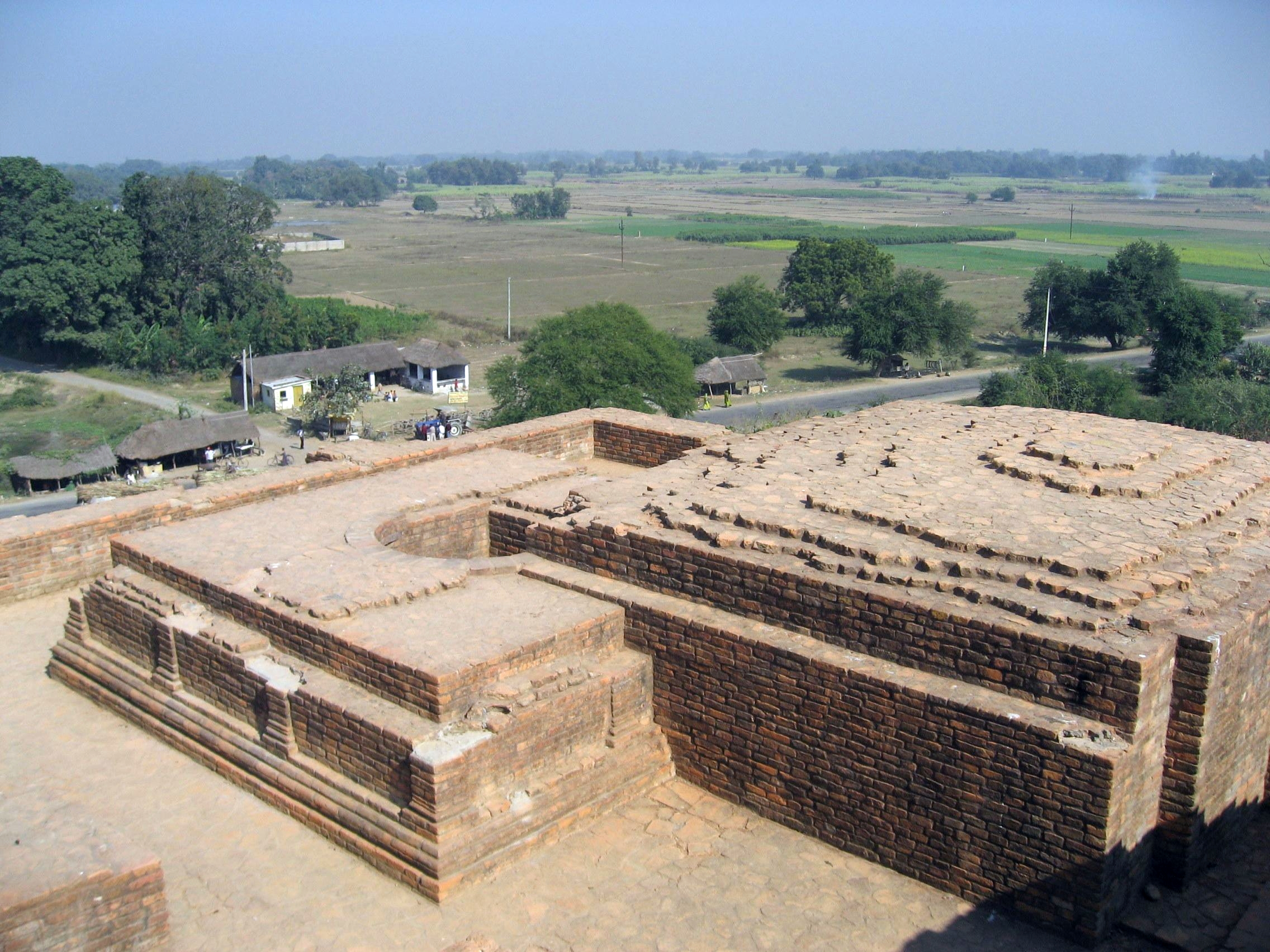
Place (Stupa) of the Twin Miracle.

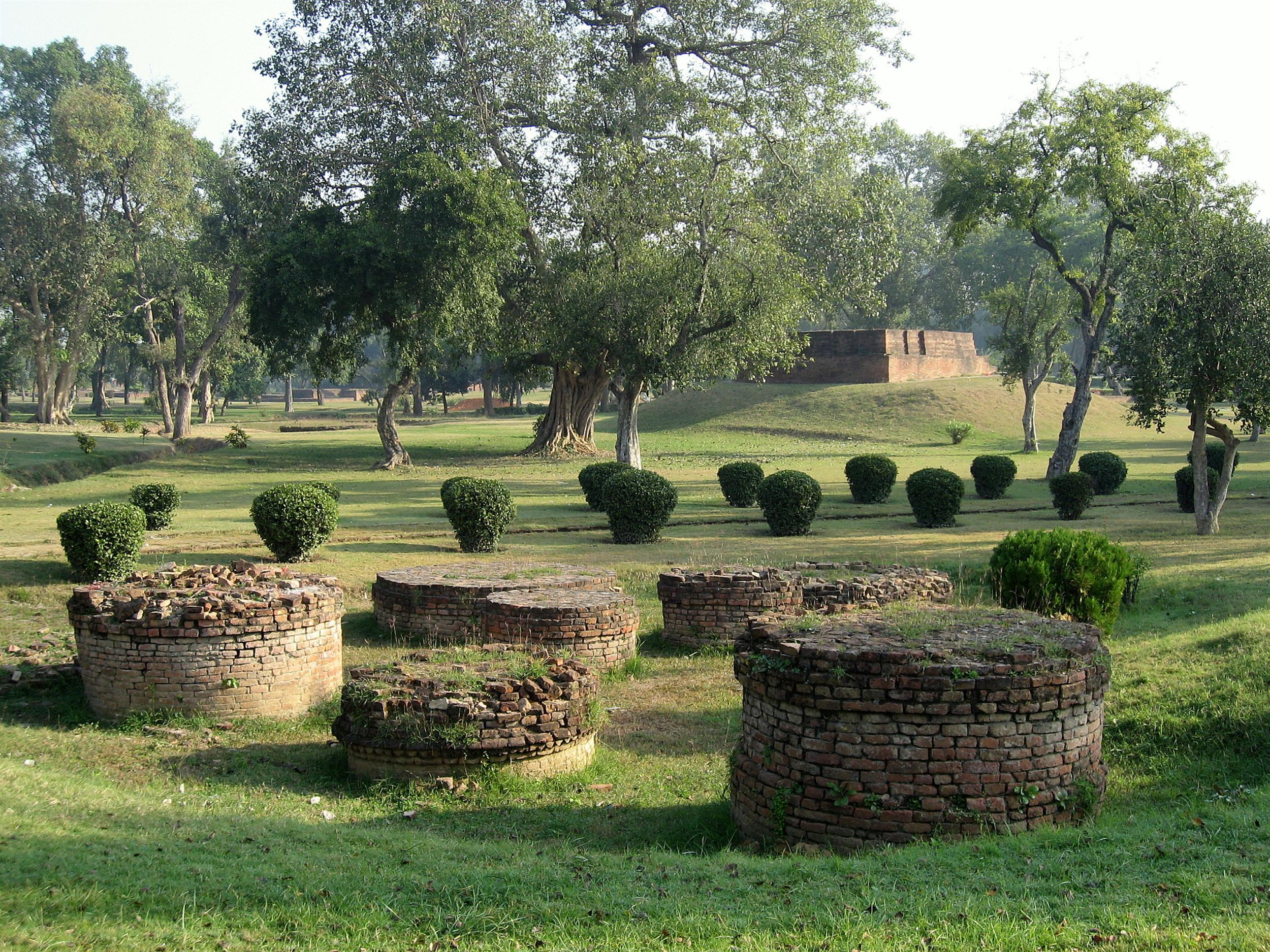
Scene in Jetavana, showing some small stupas.

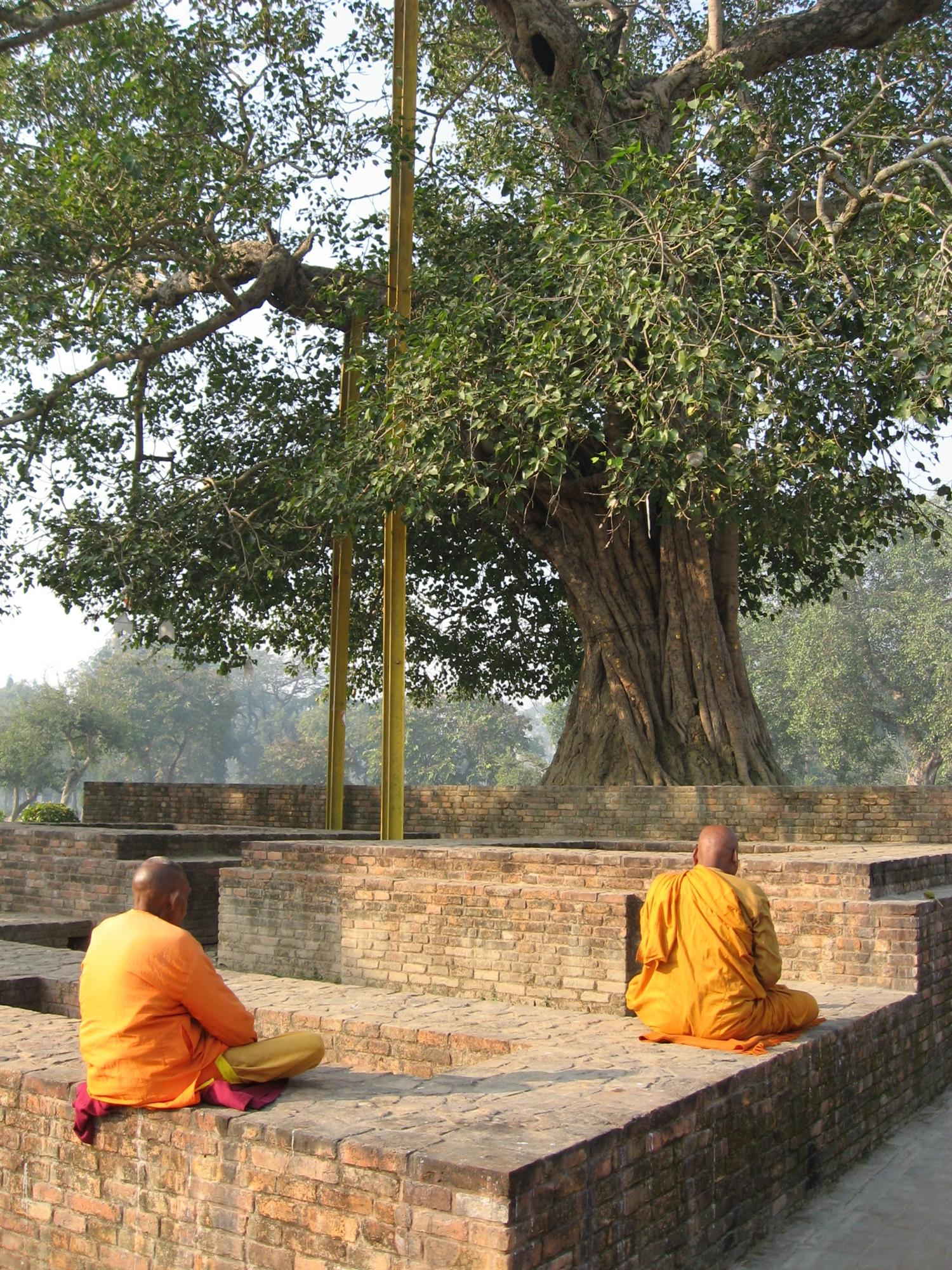
Buddhist monks meditating under the Anandabodhi tree.

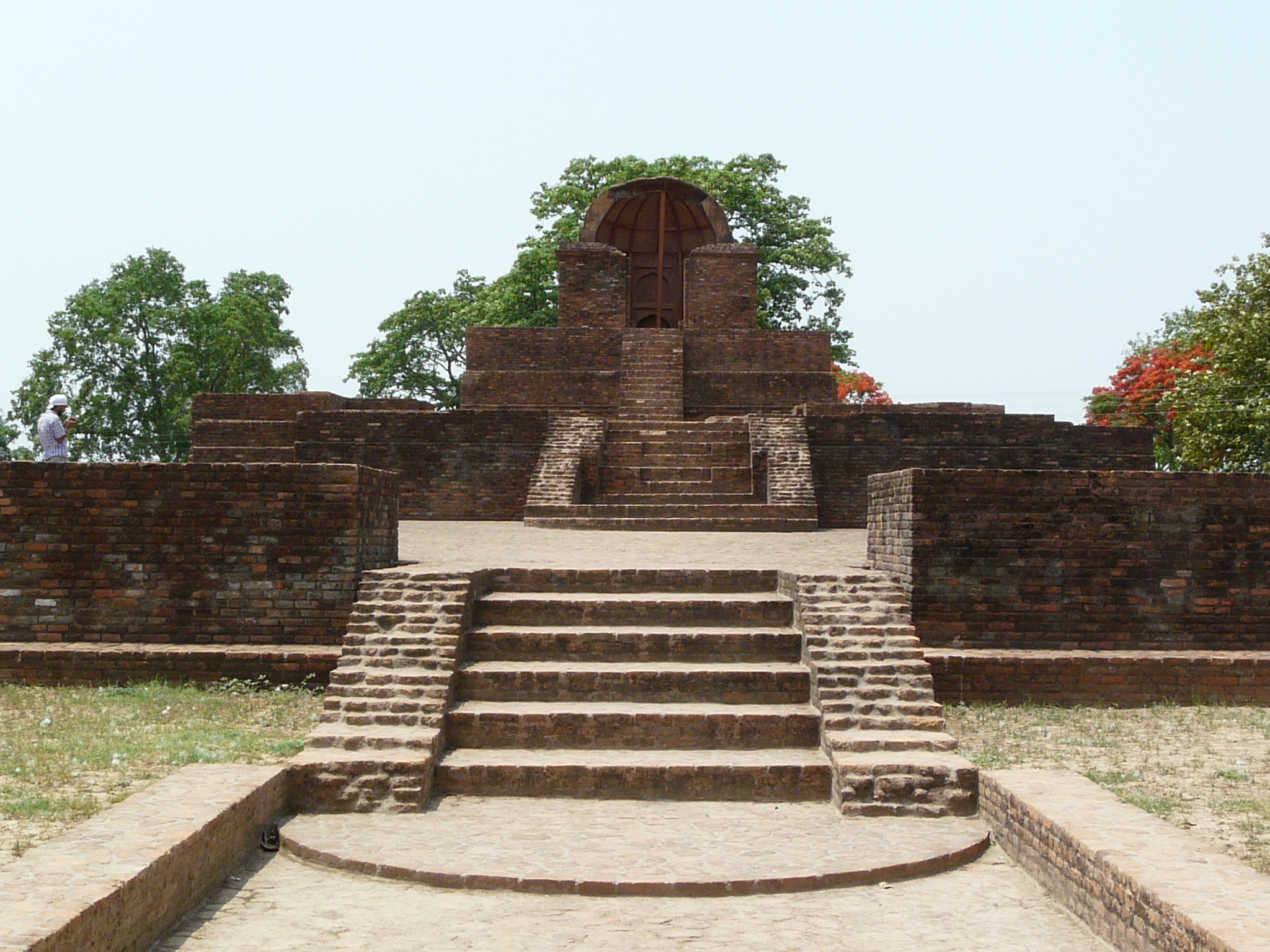
Shobhnath Jain temple

== Legacy ==
The site is the basis of the "Miracle of Sravasti" artwork found in numerous Buddhist sites and literature, all over Asia.

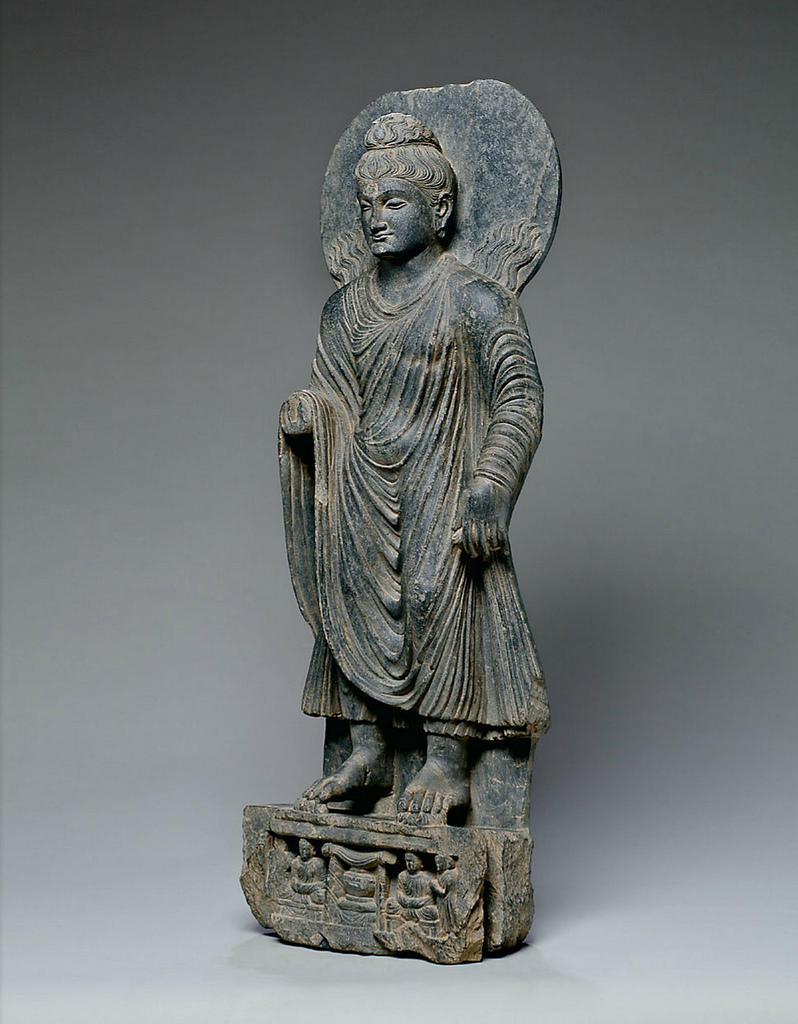
Statue of Buddha performing the Miracle of Shravasti, Gandhara, 100-200 CE.

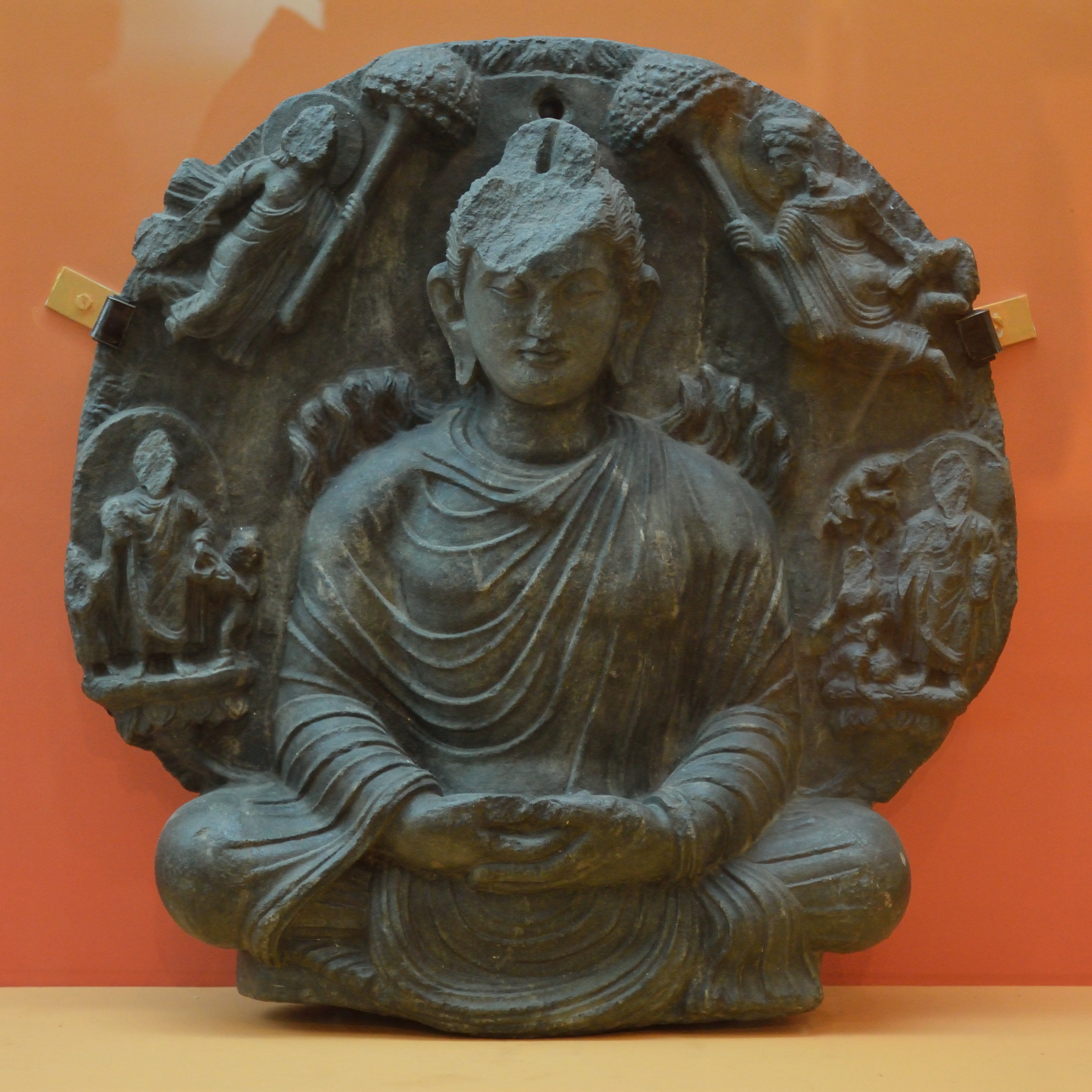
Miracle of Sravasti, ca 2nd Century CE - Gandhara

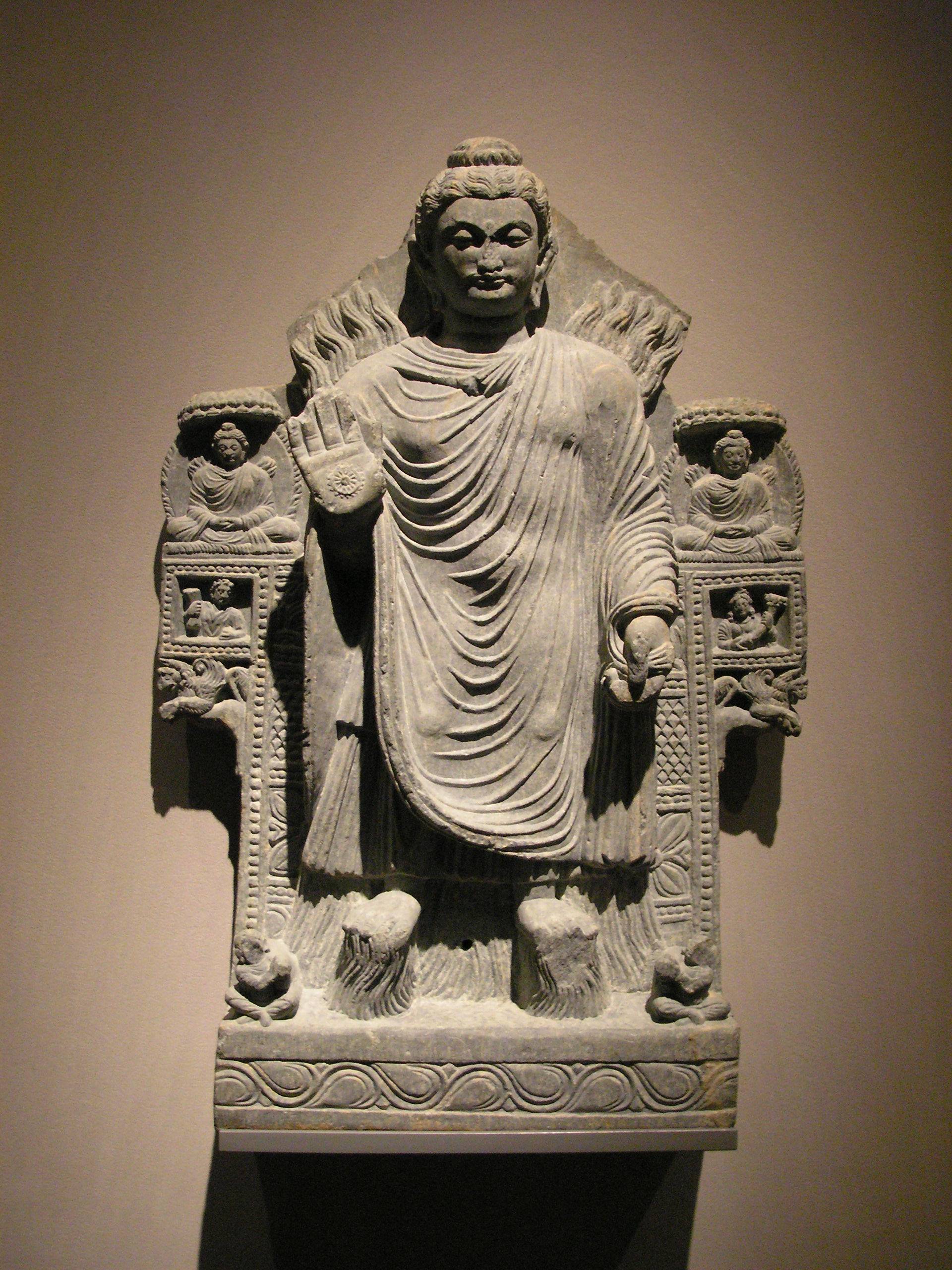
Gandhara, 3rd century CE.

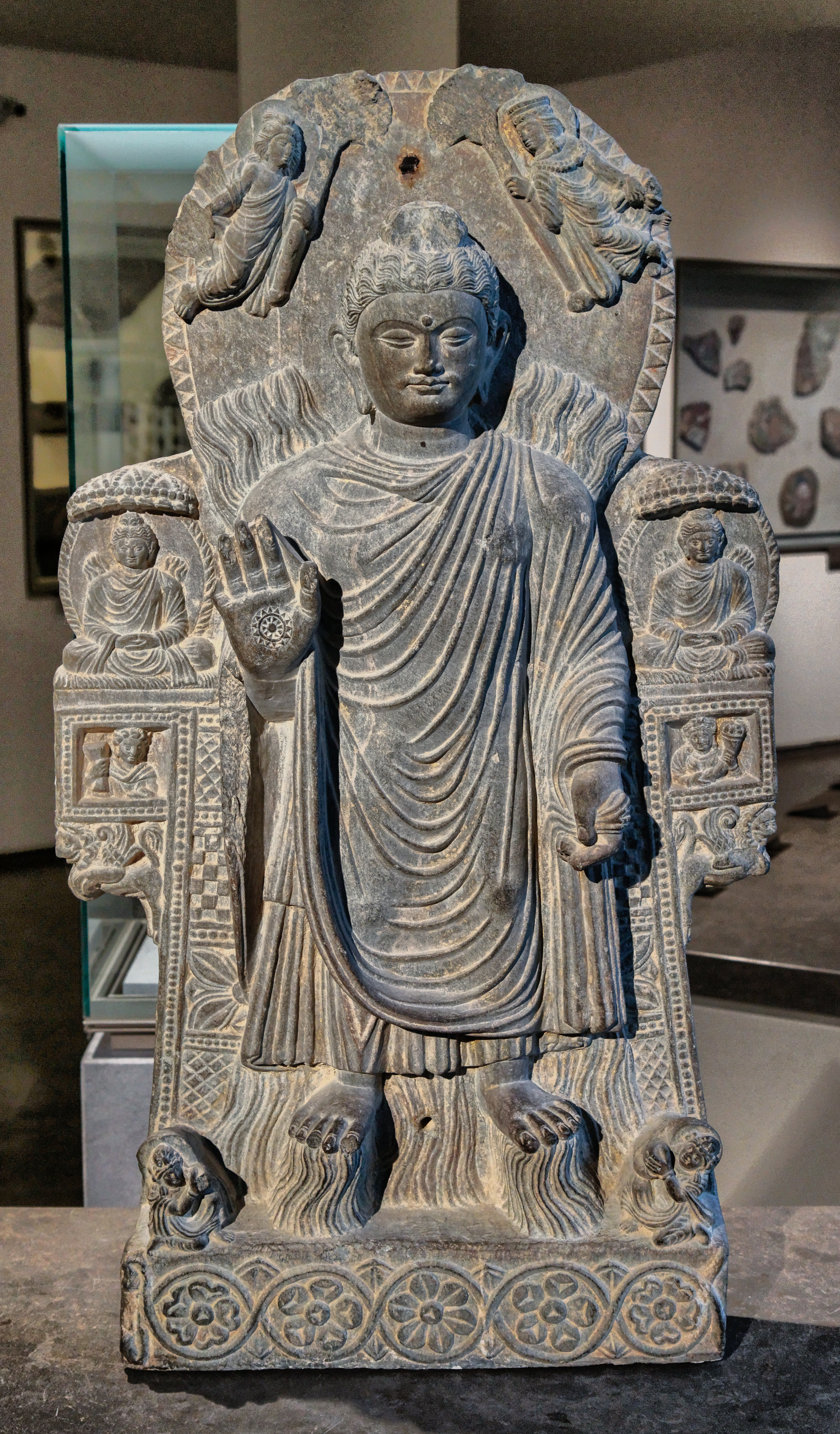
Kapisa, 3rd century CE.

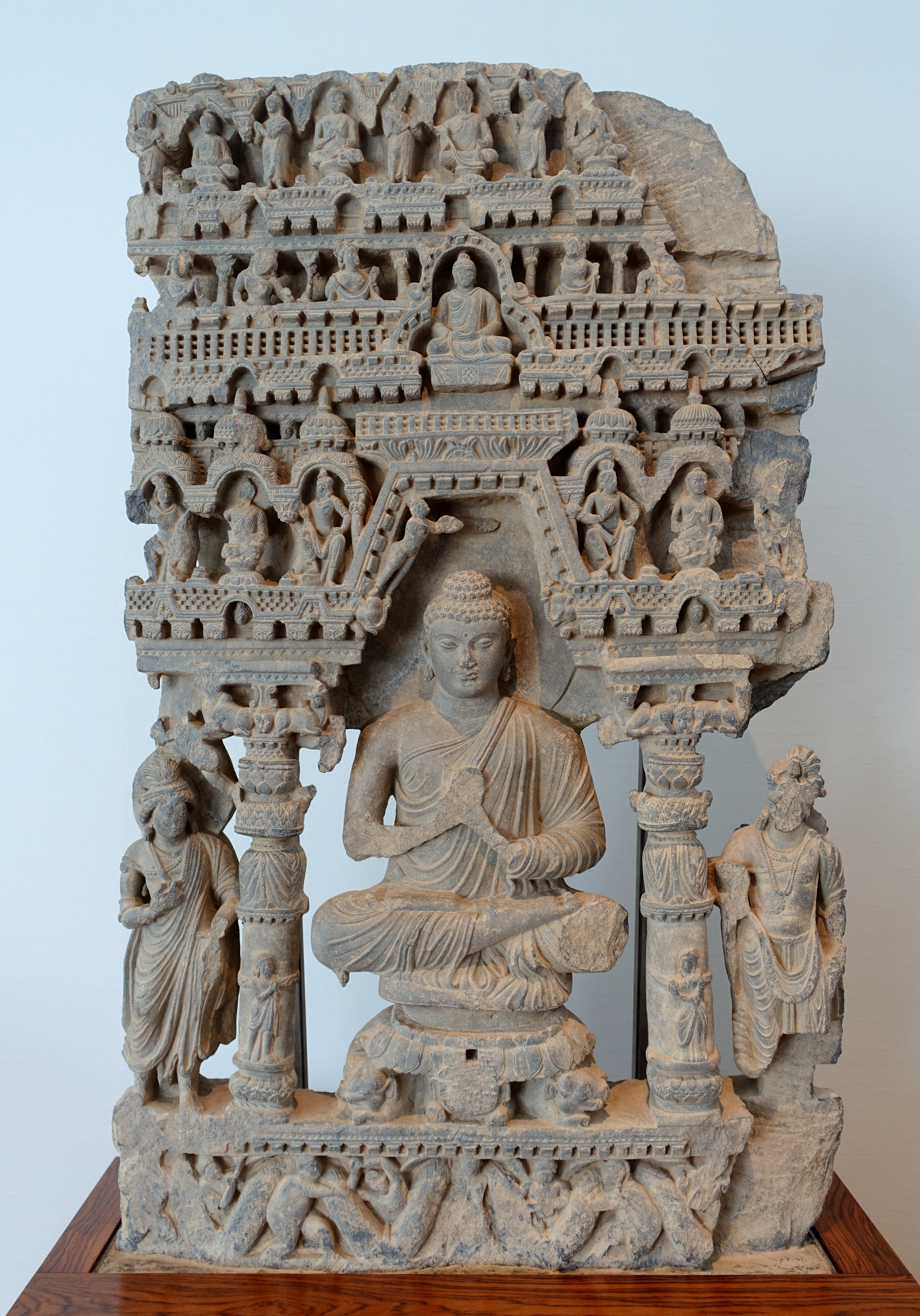
Gandhara, c. 3rd century CE
