= Jainism and non-creationism =

Non-belief of Jainism in creationism

According to Jain doctrine, the universe and its constituents—soul, matter, space, time, and principles of motion—have always existed. Jainism does not support belief in a creator deity. All the constituents and actions are governed by universal natural laws. It is not possible to create matter out of nothing and hence the sum total of matter in the universe remains the same (similar to law of conservation of mass). Jain texts claim that the universe consists of jiva (life force or souls) and ajiva (lifeless objects). The soul of each living being is unique and uncreated and has existed during beginningless time.^{[a]}

The Jain theory of causation holds that a cause and its effect are always identical in nature and hence a conscious and immaterial entity like God cannot create a material entity like the universe. Furthermore, according to the Jain concept of divinity, any soul who destroys its karmas and desires achieves liberation (nirvana). A soul who destroys all its passions and desires has no desire to interfere in the working of the universe. Moral rewards and sufferings are not the work of a divine being, but a result of an innate moral order in the cosmos: a self-regulating mechanism whereby the individual reaps the fruits of their own actions through the workings of the karmas.

Through the ages, Jain philosophers have rejected and opposed the concept of any omnipotent creator god, and this has resulted in Jainism being labeled as nastika darsana, or an atheist philosophy by the rival religious philosophies. The theme of non-creationism and absence of omnipotent God and divine grace runs strongly in all the philosophical dimensions of Jainism, including its cosmology, karma, moksa and its moral code of conduct. Jainism asserts that a religious and virtuous life is possible without the idea of a creator god.

== Jaina conception of the Universe ==
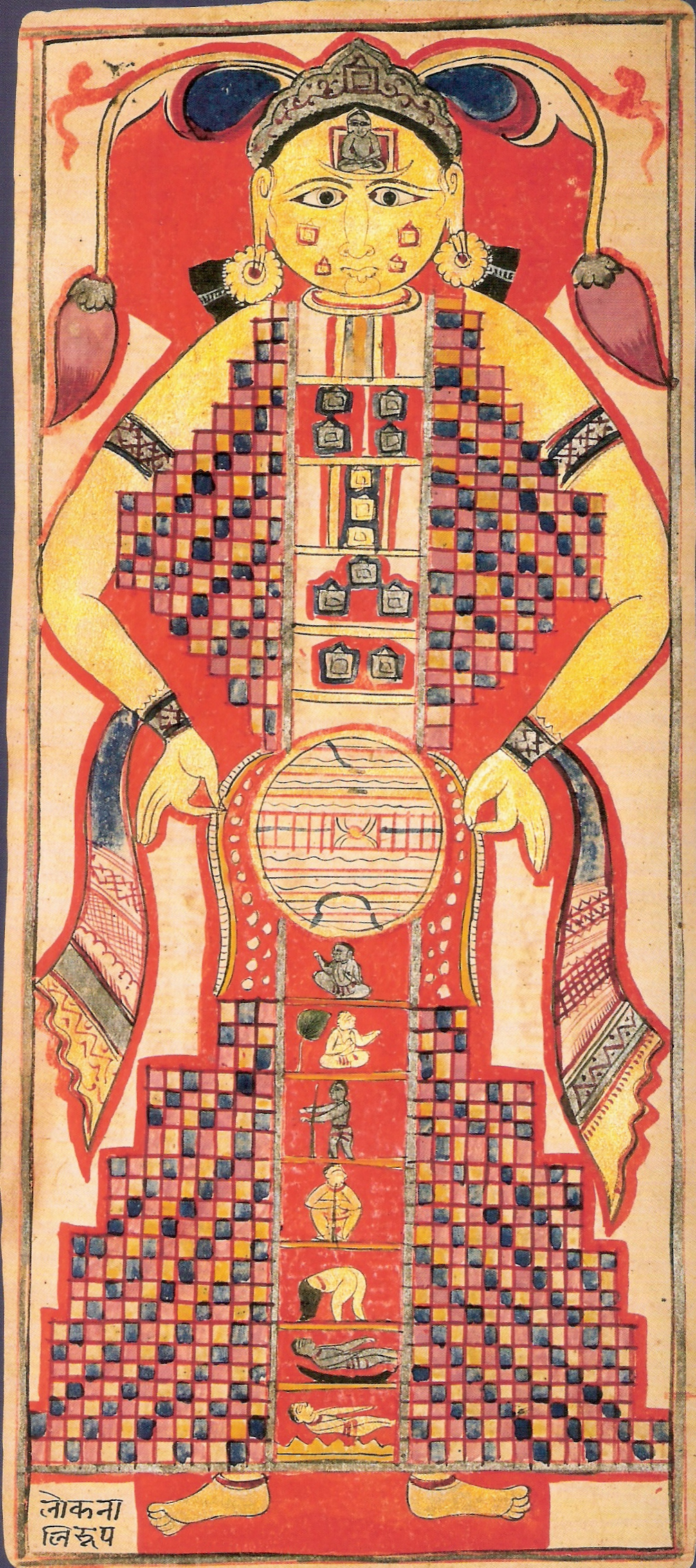
Representation of the Universe in Jain cosmology in form of a lokapurusa or cosmic man.

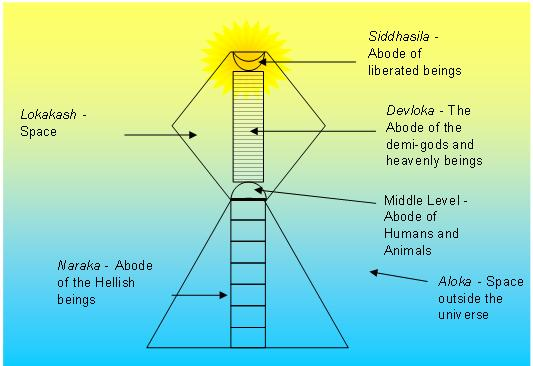
Structure of Universe as per the Jain Scriptures.

Jain scriptures reject God as the creator of the universe. Jainism offers an elaborate cosmology, including heavenly beings/devas. These heavenly beings are not viewed as creators, they are subject to suffering and change like all other living beings, and must eventually die. If godliness is defined as the state of having freed one's soul from karmas and the attainment of enlightenment/Nirvana and a god as one who exists in such a state, then those who have achieved such a state can be termed gods/Tirthankara. Thus, Mahavira was a god/Tirthankara.

According to Jains, this loka or universe is an entity, always existing in varying forms with no beginning or end. Jain texts describe the shape of the universe as similar to a man standing with legs apart and arms resting on his waist. Thus, the universe is narrow at the top, widens above the middle, narrows towards the middle, and once again becomes broad at the bottom.^{[b]}

=== Wheel of time ===
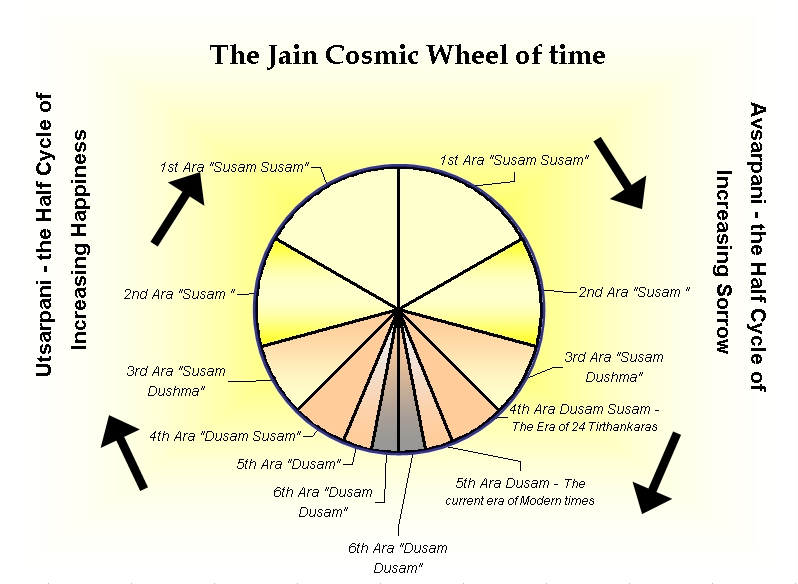
Jain Cosmic Wheel of Time

According to Jainism, time is beginningless and eternal. The cosmic wheel of time rotates ceaselessly. This cyclic nature eliminates the need for a creator, destroyer or external deity to maintain the universe.

The wheel of time is divided into two half-rotations, Utsarpiṇī or ascending time cycle and Avasarpiṇī, the descending time cycle, occurring continuously after each other. Utsarpiṇī is a period of progressive prosperity and happiness where the time spans and ages are at an increasing scale, while Avsarpiṇī is a period of increasing sorrow and immorality.

=== Concept of reality ===
This universe is made up of what Jainas call the six dravyas or substances classified as follows –

- Jīva – The living substances

Jains believe that souls (Jīva) exist as a reality, with a separate existence from the body that houses it. It is characterised by cetana (consciousness) and upayoga (knowledge and perception). Though the soul experiences both birth and death, it is neither destroyed nor created. Decay and origin refer respectively to the disappearance of one state of a soul and appearance of another, both merely various modes of the soul.

- Ajīva – Non-Living Substances
  - Pudgala or Matter – Matter is solid, liquid, gas, energy, fine karmic materials and extra-fine matter or ultimate particles. Paramānu or ultimate particles are the basic building block of matter. One quality of paramānu and pudgala is permanence and indestructibility. It combines and changes its modes but its qualities remain the same. According to Jainism, it cannot be created nor destroyed.
  - Dharma-tattva or Medium of Motion and Adharma-tattva or Medium of Rest – Also known as Dharmāstikāya and Adharmāstikāya, they are distinct to Jain thought depicting motion and rest. They pervade the entire universe. Dharma-tattva and Adharma-tattva are by itself not motion or rest but mediate motion and rest in other bodies. Without dharmāstikāya motion is impossible and without adharmāstikāya rest is impossible in the Universe.
  - Ākāśa or Space – Space is a substance that accommodates living souls, matter, the principles of motion and rest, and time. It is all-pervading, infinite and made of infinite space-points.
  - Kāla or Time – Time is a real entity according to Jainism and all activities, changes or modifications are achieved only in time. Time is like a wheel with twelve spokes divided into descending and ascending: half with six stages of immense durations, each estimated at billions of "ocean years" (sagaropama). In each descending stage, sorrow increases and at each ascending stage, happiness and bliss increase.

These uncreated constituents of the universe impart dynamics upon the universe by interacting with each other. These constituents behave according to natural laws without interference from external entities. Dharma or true religion according to Jainism is vatthu sahāvo dhammo translated as "the intrinsic nature of a substance is its true dharma."^{[c]}

=== Material cause and effect ===
According to Jainism, causes are of two types – Upādanā kārana (substantial or material cause) and Nimitta kārana (instrumental cause). Upādanā kārana is always identical with its effect. For example, out of clay, you can only produce a clay pot; hence the clay is the upādanā kārana or material cause and the clay pot its effect. Wherever the effect is present, the cause is present and vice versa. The effect is always present in latent form in the material cause. For transforming the clay to a pot, the potter, the wheel, the stick and other operating agents are required that are merely nimitta or instrumental causes or catalysts in transformation. The material cause always remains the clay. Hence the cause and effect are always entirely identical in nature.^{[g]} A potter cannot be the material cause of the pot. If this were the case, then the potter might as well prepare the pot without any clay. But this is not so. Thus a clay pot can only be made from clay; gold ornaments can be made only from gold. Similarly, the different modes of existence of a soul are a result of activities of the soul itself. There cannot be any contradiction or exceptions.

In such a scenario, Jains argue that the material cause of a living soul with cetana (conscious entity) is always the soul itself and the cause of dead inert matter (non-cetana i.e. without any consciousness) is always the matter itself. If God is indeed the creator, then this is an impossible predication as the same cause will be responsible for two contradictory effects of cetana (life) and acetana (matter). This logically precludes an immaterial God (a conscious entity) from creating this universe, which is made up of material substances.

=== The soul ===
According to Jainism, one of the qualities of the soul is complete lordship of its own destiny. The soul alone chooses its actions and the soul alone reaps its consequences. No god or prophet or angel can interfere in the actions or the destiny of the soul. It is the soul alone who makes the necessary efforts to achieve liberation without any divine grace.

Jains frequently assert that “we are alone” in this world.^{[h]} Amongst the Twelve Contemplations (anupreksas) of Jains, one is the loneliness of one's soul and nature of the universe and transmigration. Hence only by cleansing our soul by our own actions can we help ourselves.

Jainism thus lays a strong emphasis on the efforts and the free will of the soul to achieve the desired goal of liberation.

== Jaina conception of divinity ==
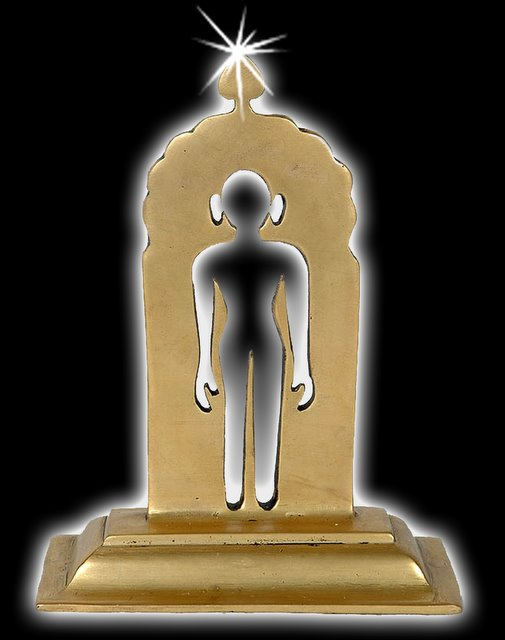
Although the siddhas (the liberated beings) are formless and without a body, this is how the Jain temples often depict the siddhas.

According to Jainism, gods can be categorized into Tīrthankaras, arihants or ordinary kevalins and siddhas. Jainism considers the devīs and devas to be celestial beings who dwell in heavens owing to meritorious deeds in their past lives.

=== Arihants ===
Arihants, also known as kevalins, are "gods" (supreme souls) in embodied states who ultimately become siddhas, or liberated souls, at the time of their nirvana. An arihant is a soul who has destroyed all passions, is totally unattached and without any desire and hence has destroyed the four ghātiyā karmas and attained Kevala jñāna, or omniscience. Such a soul still has a body and four aghātiyā karmas. An arhata, at the end of his lifespan, destroys his remaining aghātiyā karma and becomes a siddha.

=== Tīrthankaras ===
Tīrthankaras (also known as Jinas) are arihants who are teachers and revivers of the Jain philosophy. There are 24 Tīrthankaras in each time cycle; Mahāvīra was the 24th and last Tīrthankara of the current time cycle. Tīrthankaras are literally the ford makers who have shown the way to cross the ocean of rebirth and transmigration and hence have become a focus of reverence and worship amongst Jains. However it would be a mistake to regard the Tīrthankaras as gods analogous to the gods of the Hindu pantheon despite the superficial resemblances in Jain and Hindu way of worship. Tīrthankaras, like arhatas, ultimately become siddhas on liberation. Tīrthankaras, being liberated, are beyond any kind of transactions with the rest of the universe. They are not the beings who exercise any sort of creative activity or who have the capacity or ability to intervene in answers to prayers.

=== Siddhas ===
Siddhashila as per the Jain cosmology

Ultimately, all arihants and Tīrthankaras become siddhas. A siddha is a soul who is permanently liberated from the transmigratory cycle of birth and death. Such a soul, having realized its true self, is free from all the karmas and embodiment. They are formless and dwell in Siddhashila (the realm of the liberated beings) at the apex of the universe in infinite bliss, infinite perception, infinite knowledge and infinite energy. Siddhahood is the ultimate goal of all souls.

Jains pray to these passionless gods not for any favours or rewards but rather pray to the qualities of the god with the objective of destroying the karmas and achieving godhood. This is best understood by the term – vandetadgunalabhdhaye i.e. we pray to the attributes of such gods to acquire such attributes”.^{[f]}

=== Heavenly beings – Demi-gods and demi-goddesses ===
Jainism describes the existence of śāsanadevatās and śāsanadevīs, the attendant gods and goddesses of Tīrthankaras, who create the samavasarana or the divine preaching assembly of a Tīrthankara.

These Gods tainted with attachment and passion;

having women and weapons by their side, favour some and disfavour some;

such Gods should not be worshipped by those who desire emancipation

Worship of such gods is considered as mithyātva or wrong belief leading to bondage of karmas.

== Nature of karmas ==
According to Robert Zydendos, karma in Jainism can be considered a kind of system of laws, but natural rather than moral laws. In Jainism, actions that carry moral significance are considered to cause certain consequences in just the same way as, for instance, physical actions that do not carry any special moral significance. When one holds an apple in one's hand and then let go of the apple, the apple will fall: this is only natural. There is no judge, and no moral judgment involved, since this is a mechanical consequence of the physical action.

Hence in accordance with the natural karmic laws, consequences occur when one utters a lie, steals something, commits acts of senseless violence or leads the life of a debauchee. Rather than assume that moral rewards and retribution are the work of a divine judge, the Jains believe that there is an innate moral order to the cosmos, self-regulating through the workings of karma. Morality and ethics are important, not because of the personal whim of a fictional god, but because a life that is led in agreement with moral and ethical principles is beneficial: it leads to a decrease and finally to the total loss of karma, which means: to ever increasing happiness.

Karmas are often wrongly interpreted as a method for reward and punishment of a soul for its good and bad deeds. In Jainism, there is no question of there being any reward or punishment, as each soul is the master of its own destiny. The karmas can be said to represent a sum total of all unfulfilled desires of a soul. They enable the soul to experience the various themes of the lives that it desires to experience. They ultimately mature when the necessary supportive conditions required for maturity are fulfilled. Hence a soul may transmigrate from one life form to another for countless of years, taking with it the karmas that it has earned, until it finds conditions that bring about the fruits.

Hence whatever suffering or pleasure that a soul may be experiencing now is on account of choices that it has made in past. That is why Jainism stresses pure thinking and moral behavior. Apart from Buddhism, perhaps Jainism is the only religion that does not invoke the fear of God as a reason for moral behavior.

The karmic theory in Jainism operates endogenously. Tirthankaras are not attributed "absolute godhood" under Jainism. Thus, even the Tirthankaras themselves have to go through the stages of emancipation, for attaining that state. While Buddhism does give a similar and to some extent a matching account for Gautama Buddha, Hinduism maintains a totally different theory where "divine grace" is needed for emancipation.

The following quote in Bhagavatī Ārādhanā (1616) sums up the predominance of karmas in Jain doctrine:-

There is nothing mightier in the world than karma; karma tramples down all powers, as an elephant a clump of lotuses.

Thus it is not the so-called all embracing omnipotent God, but the law of karma that is the all governing force responsible for the manifest differences in the status, attainments and happiness of all life forms. It operates as a self-sustaining mechanism as natural universal law, without any need of an external entity to manage them.

== Jain opposition to creationism ==
Jain scriptures reject God as the creator of universe. 12th century Ācārya Hemacandra puts forth the Jain view of universe in the Yogaśāstra thus^{[i]} –

This universe is not created nor sustained by anyone; It is self-sustaining, without any base or support

Besides scriptural authority, Jains also resorted to syllogism and deductive reasoning to refute the creationist theories. Various views on divinity and universe held by the vedics, sāmkhyas, mimimsas, Buddhists and other schools of thought were analysed, debated and repudiated by the various Jain Ācāryas. However the most eloquent refutation of this view is provided by Ācārya Jinasena in Mahāpurāna thus^{[j]} –

Some foolish men declare that a creator made the world. The doctrine that the world was created is ill advised and should be rejected.

If God created the world, where was he before the creation? If you say he was transcendent then and needed no support, where is he now?

No single being had the skill to make the world - for how can an immaterial god create that which is material?

How could God have made this world without any raw material? If you say that he made this first, and then the world, you are faced with an endless regression.

If you declare that this raw material arose naturally you fall into another fallacy, for the whole universe might thus have been its own creator, and have arisen quite naturally.

If God created the world by an act of his own will, without any raw material, then it is just his will and nothing else — and who will believe this silly nonsense?

If he is ever perfect and complete, how could the will to create have arisen in him? If, on the other hand, he is not perfect, he could no more create the universe than a potter could.

If he is form-less, action-less and all-embracing, how could he have created the world? Such a soul, devoid of all modality, would have no desire to create anything.

If he is perfect, he does not strive for the three aims of man, so what advantage would he gain by creating the universe?

If you say that he created to no purpose because it was his nature to do so, then God is pointless. If he created in some kind of sport, it was the sport of a foolish child, leading to trouble.

If he created because of the karma of embodied beings [acquired in a previous creation] He is not the Almighty Lord, but subordinate to something else.

If out of love for living beings and need of them he made the world, why did he not make creation wholly blissful free from misfortune?

If he were transcendent he would not create, for he would be free: nor if involved in transmigration, for then he would not be almighty. Thus the doctrine that the world was created by God makes no sense at all,

And God commits great sin in slaying the children whom he himself created. If you say that he slays only to destroy evil beings, why did he create such beings in the first place?

Good men should combat the believer in divine creation, maddened by an evil doctrine. Know that the world is uncreated, as time itself is, without beginning or end, and is based on the principles, life and rest.

Uncreated and indestructible, it endures under the compulsion of its own nature.

== Reception ==
The Jaina position on God and religion from a perspective of a non-Jain can be summed up in the words of Anne Vallely.

Jainism is the most difficult religion. We get no help from any gods, or from anyone. We just have to cleanse our souls. In fact other religions are easy, but they are not very ambitious. In all other religions when you are in difficulty, you can pray to God for help and maybe, God comes down to help. But Jainism is not a religion of coming down. In Jainism it is we who must go up. We only have to help ourselves. In Jainism we have to become God. That is the only thing.

=== Criticism ===
Jainism, along with Buddhism, has been categorized as atheist philosophy (i.e. Nāstika darśana) by the followers of Vedic religion. However, the word Nāstika corresponds more to "heterodox" than to "atheism".

Sinclair Stevenson, an Irish missionary, declared that "the heart of Jainism is empty” since it does not depend on beseeching an omnipotent God for salvation. While fervently appealing for them to accept Christianity, she says Jains believe strongly in forgiving others, and yet have no hope of forgiveness by a higher power. Jains believe that liberation is by personal effort, not an appeal for divine intervention.

If atheism is defined as disbelief in the existence of a god, then Jainism cannot be labeled as atheistic, as it not only believes in the existence of gods but also of the soul which can attain godhood. As Paul Dundas puts it – "while Jainism is, as we have seen, atheist in a limited sense of rejection of both the existence of a creator God and the possibility of intervention of such a being in human affairs, it nonetheless must be regarded as a theist religion in the more profound sense that it accepts the existence of divine principle, the paramātmā i.e. God, existing in potential state within all beings".

However the usage of the word "paramatma" is not entirely accurate as there is no concept of "param-atma" or supreme atma in Jainism. Each atma has its own unique identity and remains independent even after achieving moksha, unlike certain Hindu schools of thought where the atma merges with paramatma on achieving mukti.

The usage of the English word "God" is itself problematic and inappropriate in the context of Jainism as there is no concept of such entity - and no positive, active denial of such entity - in Jain philosophy. A siddha is an atma which has achieved moksha and the closest approximation in English would be "liberated soul".

== See also ==
- Cosmogony
- Creation myth
- Creationism
- Hindu views on evolution
- History of creationism

== Notes ==
a. Self is not an effect as it is not produced by anything nor it is a cause as it does not produce anything. Samayasāra Gāthā 10.310 See Nayanara (2005b)

b. See Vācaka Umāsvāti's description of the Universe in his Tattvārthasutra and Ācārya Hemacandras description of the universe in Yogaśāstra “…Picture a man standing with his arms akimbo – This is how Jainas believe the Loka looks like. 4.103–6

c. See Kārtikeyānupreksā, 478 – Dharma is nothing but the real nature of an object. Just as the nature of fire is to burn and the nature of water is to produce a cooling effect, in the same manner, the essential nature of the soul is to seek self-realization and spiritual elevation .

d. Vamdittu savvasiddhe .... [Samaysara 1.1] See Samaysara of Ācārya Kundakunda, Tr. By Prof A. Chakaravarti, page 1 of main text – "Jainism recognizes plurality of selves not only in world of samsara but also in the liberated state or siddhahood which is a sort of a divine republic of perfect souls where each soul retains its individual personality and does not empty its contents into the cauldron of the absolute as is maintained by other systems of philosophy"

e. See Tattvārthasūtra 1.1 "samyagdarśanajñānacāritrānimoksamārgah" – Translated as "Rational Perception, Rational Knowledge and Rational Conduct constitutes the path to liberation."

f. See Sarvārthasiddhi "Moksa mārgasya netāram bhettāram karmabhubrutām jnātāram vishva tatvānām vande tadguna labhdhaye." Translated as "We pray to those who have led the path to salvation, who have destroyed the mountains of karma, and who know the reality of the universe. We pray to them to acquire their attributes."

g. See Samayasāra 3.99–100] "If soul were indeed the producer of alien substances, then he must be of that nature; as it is not so, he cannot be their creator"

h. See Hemcandrācārya, Yogaśāstra. "eik utpadyate janturek eiv vipadyate" Translated as "each one is born alone and dies alone."

i. "Nishpaadito Na Kenaapi Na Dhritah Kenachichch Sah Swayamsiddho Niradhaaro Gagane Kimtvavasthitah". see Ācārya Hemacandra, (1989). In: S. Bothara (ed.), Dr. A. S. Gopani (Tr.), Yogaśāstra(Sanskrit). Jaipur: Prakrit Bharti Academy. Sutra 4.106

j. This quote from Mahapurana finds a mention in “Salters Horners Advanced Physics” by Jonathan Allda, which contains various scientific theories on Universe. The author quotes this extract from Mahapurana to show that Cosmology (the study of Universe) is an ancient science, which today is still probing some of the deepest questions about the origins and future of the Universe. (P 268)
