= Nyasa =

Nyasa may refer to:

- Nyasa (ritual), concept in Hinduism
- Nyasa (lake), lake in Africa also known as Lake Malawi
- Nyasa languages, group of Bantu languages
- Nyasa people

== See also ==
- Nyassa
