= Yogaśāstra =

12th-century Sanskrit text on Svetambara Jainism

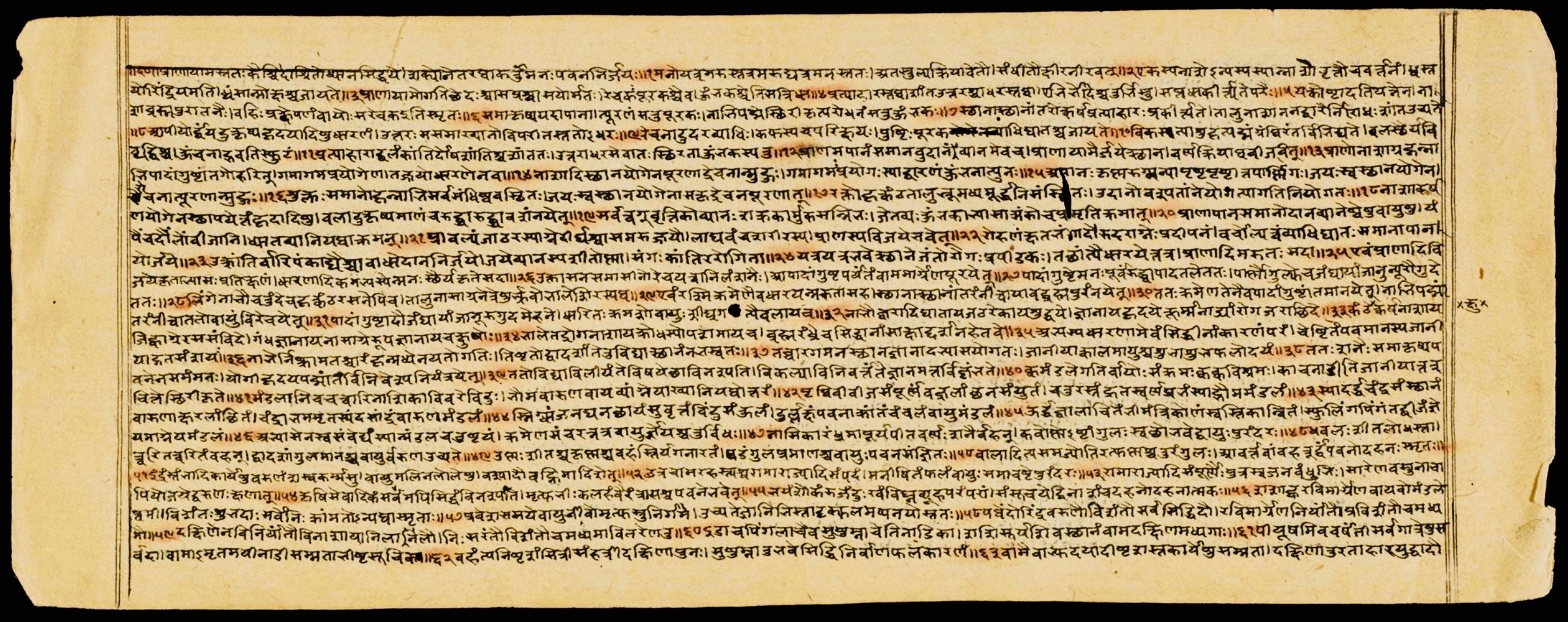
Hemacandra's Yogasastra manuscript sample page (miniature Devanagari script, Sanskrit)

Yogaśāstra (lit. "Yoga treatise") is a 12th-century Sanskrit text by Hemachandra on Śvetāmbara Jainism. It is a treatise on the "rules of conduct for laymen and ascetics", wherein "yoga" means "ratna-traya" (three jewels), i.e. right belief, right knowledge and right conduct for a Sadhaka. As a manual with an extensive auto-commentary called Svopajnavrtti, it was instrumental to the survival and growth of Śvetāmbara tradition in western Indian states such as Gujarat and the spread of Sanskrit culture in Jainism.

The Yogasastra is unlike the conventional much older yoga texts found in Buddhism and Hinduism, but shows their influence. Probably titled "yoga" because its royal patron was attached to yogic traditions of 12th-century India, the Yogasastra treatise is a systematic exposition of Jain doctrine using the Svetambara scriptures (sruta) and tradition (sampradaya), as well as the teachings of many prior Jain scholars such as Umasvati, Subhachandra, and Haribhadra.

== Contents of the work ==
The first three chapters are on the Jain "three jewels", the Ratnatraya. These include within its scope the Svetambara's equivalent to the sravakacara – also called upasaka dhyayana – of the Digambara tradition of Jainism. The text is far more extensive, and incorporates various forms of Jain yoga in an eightfold scheme similar to Patanjali, as well as Jain ethics and philosophy. Hemachandra includes and discusses topics such as pranayama, asana found in Hatha yoga, nadis, divination, Maitrī (friendship to all beings), Sadhana found in Buddhist yoga, dhyana as well as forms of Jain tantric meditation. The treatise also discusses pratima (murti), puja (devotional worship), vrata (fasting), sraddha (reverence to distant ancestors) and sangha seva (service to the Jain community).

The Yogaśāstra was translated into English by Olle Qvarnström in 2002.

== See also ==
- Yogadṛṣṭisamuccaya
- Jain literature
- Tattvartha sutra
- Yoga Sutras of Patanjali

== Bibliography ==
- Hemacandra. Yogaśāstra, ed. Muni Jambūvijaya, 3 vols, Bombay, 1977–86.
