= Nyassa =

Nyassa may refer to:

- Nyassa (singer), Australian singer, featured on the Hilltop Hoods' 2025 album Fall from the Light
- Nyassa Company, a royal company which administered part of Mozambique between 1891 and 1929
- SS Nyassa, a Portuguese-owned steamship

== See also ==
- Niassa Province, a province of Mozambique
- Nyasa (disambiguation)
- Nyssa (disambiguation)
- Nyssa (plant), a small genus of deciduous trees
