= Kayotsarga =

Yoga posture

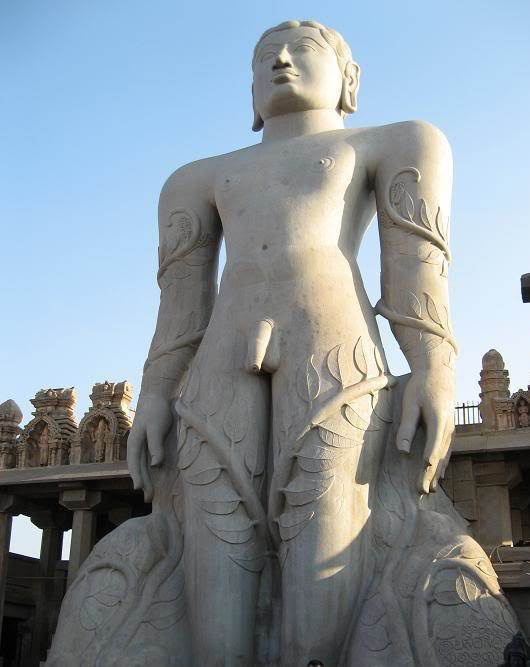
Bahubali practicing meditation in standing Kayotsarga posture. (Photo: Gommateshwara statue, Shravanbelagola)

Kayotsarga (Sanskrit: कायोत्सर्ग Kāyotsarga, Jain Prakrit: काउस्सग्ग Kāussagga) is a yogic posture which is an important part of the Jain meditation. It literally means "dismissing the body". A tirthankara is represented either seated in yoga posture or standing in the kayotsarga posture. Kayotsarga means "to give up one's physical comfort and body movements", thus staying steady, either in a standing or other posture, and concentrating upon the true nature of the soul. It is one of the six essentials (avasyaka) of a Jain ascetic and one of the 28 primary attributes of a Jain monks and nuns.

Twenty-one of the tīrthankaras of Jainism are said to have attained moksha in the kayotsarga “standing meditation” posture. An example of unflinching standing meditation is that of Arihant Bahubali who is said to have stood in kayotsarga for a year.

== Sāmayika ==
In performing sāmayika (daily meditation), the śrāvaka has to stand facing north or east and bow to the Pancha-Parameṣṭhi. He then sit down and recites the Namokara mantra a certain number of times, and finally devotes himself to holy meditation. This consists of:

- pratikramana, recounting the sins committed and repenting for them,
- pratyākhyanā, resolving to avoid particular sins in future,
- sāmayika karma, renunciation of personal attachments, and the cultivation of a feeling of regarding every body and thing alike,
- stuti, praising the twenty-four Tīrthankaras,
- vandanā, devotion to a particular Tirthankara, and
- kāyotsarga, withdrawal of attention from the body (physical personality) and becoming absorbed in the contemplation of the spiritual Self.
