= Yogadṛṣṭisamuccaya =

Jain text in Sanskrit

Yogadṛṣṭisamuccaya ("Compendium of Yoga views") is a 228-verse Sanskrit work on Yoga by the Jain Śvetāmbara philosopher Acharya Haribhadrasuri yakini putra (fl. 5th century CE). It is a particularly informative work of comparative religion which analyzes the various philosophical views (drishtis) and practices of post-Gupta Empire Buddhists, Hindus and Jains on Yoga and draws on them to present a uniquely Jaina form of Yoga, with an eightfold division.

While retaining his Jain identity, Acharya Haribhadra also promotes a form of religious pluralism, perennialism and a respect for different religious traditions. He writes that though they have different names, the teachings of those who have achieved liberation (moksha, nirvana, kevala) are grounded on a common truth. For Haribhadra:

"Perhaps the teaching is one, but there are various people who hear it. On account of the inconceivable merit it bestows, it shines forth in various ways." (YDS 136)

He also writes that "There could never be a single road to different cities". (YDS 114)

Haribhadra uses the Yoga Sutras of Patanjali to develop his system of Jain meditation and Yoga. He compares Patanjali's system of eightfold yoga with three other systems, a Buddhist Yoga attributed to a certain Bhadanta Bhāskara, Vedanta Yoga system attributed to Bandhu Bhagavaddatta, and Haribhadra's own Jain Yoga system. The eightfold Yoga system promoted by Haribhadra has the following eight yogas:

- Friendly (Mitrā) – Respect for and emulation of the wise – yamas
- Protector (Tārā) – Performing service – niyama
- Power (Balā) – Control of posture and passions or asana
- Shining (Dīprā) – Control of breath – pranayama
- Firm (Sthirā) – Inwardness – pratyahara
- Pleasing (Kāntā) – Concentration – dharana
- Radiant (Prabhā) – Meditative absorption – dhyana
- Highest (Parā) – Samadhi, ayoga kevala, "highest nirvana"

Haribhadra compares and correlates these eight facets of his Jain yoga with the three other systems. He also attempts to map them into the older Jain system of stages of spiritual growth and development – the gunasthana. The first yoga for example, is seen as encompassing the fourth through the seventh gunasthana.

While Acharya Haribhadra is liberal with his overview of various Yoga traditions, he remains committed to the Jain philosophy and criticizes other Yoga systems for not being complete or for being false. He equally critiques Buddhist theories of momentariness and Hindu monism. He also engages against particular Yoga practices he considers misguided, such as Tantra and elaborate sacrifices, which he argues offer little spiritual advancement.

== See also ==
- Jain meditation
- Jain literature
- Tattvartha sutra
- Yoga Sutras of Patanjali
- Folding book manuscript

== Bibliography ==
- Haribhadra. Yogadṛṣṭisamuccaya, ed. and trans. K. K. Dixit, Ahmedabad, 1970.
