= Haribhadra =

Jain leader, philosopher and author (c. 459–529)

Aacharya Shri Haribhadra Suriji
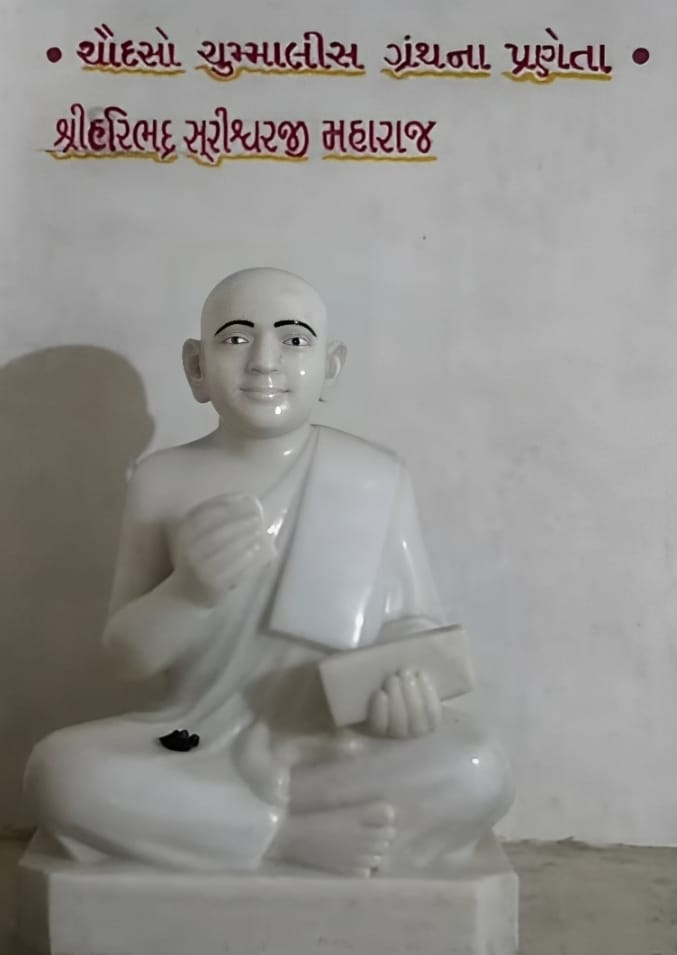
- Author of 1444 volumes: Yākini Mahattarā Sūnu Acharya Haribhadrasuri Maharaja

Personal life
- Born: 459
- Died: 529 (aged 69–70)

Religious life
- Religion: Jainism
- Sect: Śvetāmbara

Acharya Haribhadra Suri was a Śvetāmbara mendicant Jain leader, philosopher, doxographer, and author. There are multiple contradictory dates assigned to his birth. According to tradition, he lived in c. 459–529 CE. However, in 1919, a Jain monk named Jinvijay pointed out that given his familiarity with Dharmakirti, a more likely choice would be sometime after 650. In his writings, Haribhadra identifies himself as a student of Jinabhaṭasūri of the Vidyadhara Kula. There are several, somewhat contradictory, accounts of his life. He wrote several books on Yoga, such as the Yogadṛṣṭisamuccaya and on comparative religion, outlining and analyzing the theories of Hindus, Buddhists and Jains.

== Life ==
The earliest story of his life say that Haribhadra was born in Dharmapuri and that he was an educated Brahmin who decided that he would become a pupil of anyone who could state a sentence which Haribhadra could not understand. After hearing a Jain nun named Yākinī Mahattarā recite a verse that he could not understand, he was sent to her teacher Jinabhaṭa, who promised Haribhadra that he would instruct him if Haribhadra accepted initiation into Jainism. Haribhadra agreed, and took the name Yākinīputra (Spiritual Son of Yākinī).

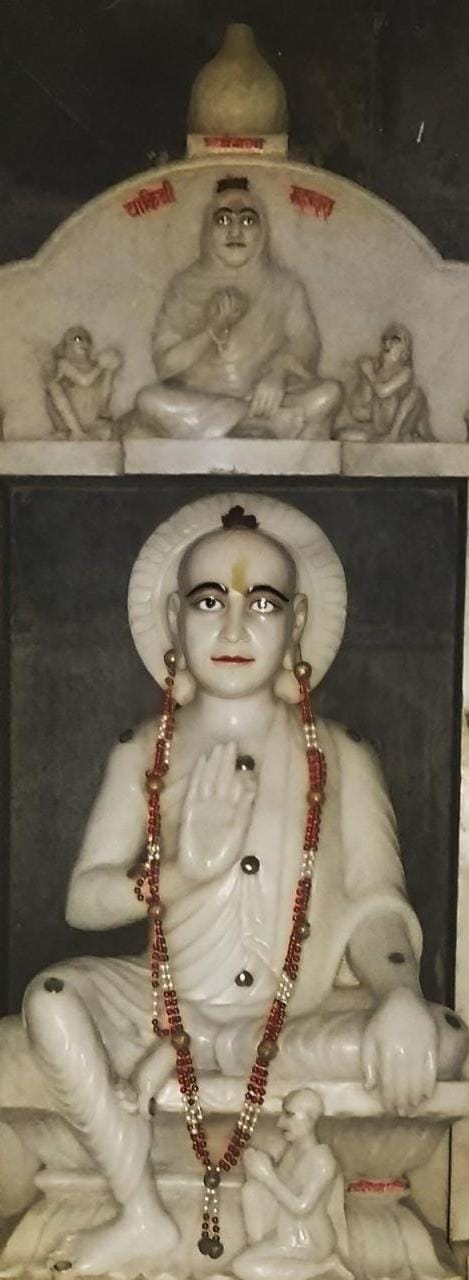
An idol of Yākiniputra Ācārya Haribhadrasuri and Yākini Mahattarā at Chittorgarh Śvetāmbara Jain Temple, Rajasthan

The second account, which bears similarities to the story of Akalanka Digambara, also shows the state of relations between Buddhist and Jain mendicants at the time. In this story, Haribhadra was teaching two of his nephews. These nephews went to secretly study logic at a Buddhist temple, and fled after being discovered there. One of them was killed by the Buddhists, and the other died of grief later. Haribhadra engaged the monks of this monastery in a philosophical debate, and emerged victorious. He then ordered the losing monks to jump into a vat of hot oil. When Haribhadra's own teacher heard of this, he ordered Haribhadra to undertake severe penances for his unseemly display of anger and attachment. Haribhadra did so, and took the title "Virahānka", which means "having separation (or viraha, from his nephews) as a distinguishing characteristic".

Tradition ascribes some 1444 different works to him. A more creditable number is in the vicinity of 100, some of which are among the most highly regarded works in Jainism. Scholar H.R. Kapadia attributes eighty-seven works to Haribhadra, Jinavijaya attributes twenty-six and Sukhlal Sanghvi attributes forty-seven. Some have even suggested that, based on the language and subject material of the books ascribed to Haribhadra, there were two Haribhadras, the first of which, Haribhadra Virahāṅka, may have lived around the sixth century, and the second, Haribhadra Yākinīputra, was a monk who lived in a temple around the eighth century. Scholars of the Śvetāmbara community itself tend to hold with the belief that there was only one Haribhadra. Among his important teachings were tolerance for other traditions, and that ultimate reality can be grasped from multiple different perspectives.

== Philosophy and influence ==
With his writings, he established that Sanskrit, rather than Prakrit, would be the language of Jain study. He used his only familiarity with the techniques of brahmanical study and wrote in the same style. He is also noted for the great respect he displays toward other religious traditions. He even did what few other Jain scholars have done, and wrote a commentary on the Nyāyapraveśa, a text by Śaṅkarasvāmin on the form of Indian logic formulated by the Buddhist scholar Dignāga. He does however ultimately support Jain thought, arguing that the other beliefs tend to display only a one-sided view of the greater reality. He tried to combine the good points of various religious philosophies that existed in his times for spiritual liberation in his work Yogadṛṣṭisamuccaya.

Haribhadra promoted a form of religious pluralism, perennialism and a respect for different religious traditions. He writes that though they have different names, the teachings of those who have achieved liberation (mokṣa, nirvāṇa, kevala) are grounded on a common truth. He wrote: "Perhaps the teaching is one, but there are various people who hear it. On account of the inconceivable merit it bestows, it shines forth in various ways."

== Works ==
Among his other works are:

- Anekāntajayapatākā [The Victory Banner of Anekantavada (Relativism)] - which puts forward arguments about Anekantavada
- Anekāntavādapraveśa, - a primer to help beginner to master works like Anekāntajayapatākā.
- Anekāntasiddhi, It establishes the concept of non-absolutism (anekānta).
- Ātmasiddhi (Realization of Self), a work of Soul
- Upadeśapada, collection of stories which depicts how difficult it is to secure a human birth
- Daṃsaṇasuddhi, text deals with Samyagdarśana (right faith) and its purity
- Darisaṇasattari, another work on Samyagdarśana
- Dhammasaṅgahaṇi, work on Dharma
- Lokatattvanirṇaya, a work of comparative religion where he talks about Hindu Gods
- Saṃsāradāvānalastuti,a work praising Tīrthaṅkaras
- Samarāiccakahā, a tale of Agniśarman and Guṇasena
- Sambohapayaraṇa, a work on philosophy
- Samasaṃskṛtaprākṛta stotra - a stotra in praise of Jina written in style such that it can be read in both Saṃskṛta and Prākṛta.
- Aṣṭakaprakaraṇa (The Eightfold Explanation): Thirty-two 8-versed works on various topics.
- Dharmabindu - which outlines the duties of the laity, outlines rules for mendicants, and describes the bliss of moksha
- Dhūrtākhyāna (The Rogue's Stories).
- Pañcāśaka Prakaraṇa - a Prakrit work on rituals and spiritual matters
- Ṣaḍdarśanasamuccaya (Compendium of Six Philosophies) - which compares Jainism with other schools of Indian philosophy
- Samarāiccakahā (The Story of Samarāicca) - a narrative which outlines the effects of karma in a story about the enmity of its characters which endures over several reincarnations
- Sāstravārtāsamuccaya (The Array of Explanatory Teachings)
- Yogabindu (The Seeds of Yoga) - a work on yoga
- Yogadṛṣṭisamuccaya (An Array of Views on Yoga) - another work on yoga
- Yogaśataka - a third work on yoga. In these three volumes, he compares the yoga of Jainism with the other varieties of yoga prevalent in India at the time
- Sarvajñasiddhi

Apart from his original works, he has also authored following commentaries:

- Śiṣyahitā on anuyogadvārasūtra
- Śiṣyahitā on Āvaśyaka Sūtra and its niryukti
- Caityavandanasūtravṛtti or Lalitavistara (Jaina)
- Laghuvṛtti on Jīvājīvābhigama-sūtra
- Śiṣyabodhinī on Daśavaikālika-sūtra
- Pradeśavyākhyā on Prajñāpanā-sūtra
- Ḍupaḍipkā on Tattvartha Sutra
