= Robert J. Zydenbos =

Dutch-Canadian scholar

- Born: 1957 (age 68–69)

Robert J. Zydenbos (born 1957) is a Dutch-Canadian scholar who has doctorate degrees in Indian philosophy and Dravidian studies. He also has a doctorate of literature from Utrecht University in the Netherlands. Zydenbos also studied Indian religions and languages at the South Asia Institute and at Heidelberg University in Germany. He taught Sanskrit at Heidelberg University and later taught Jain philosophy at the University of Madras in India. Zydenbos later taught Sanskrit, Buddhism, and South Asian religions at the University of Toronto in Canada. He was the first western scholar to write a doctoral thesis on contemporary Kannada fiction.

Zydenbos is a strong opponent to some writers, like Koenraad Elst or N. S. Rajaram, who reject the scholarly consensus that the ultimate historical origin of the Indo-Aryan languages is outside India. Zydenbos characterizes such views, which are fringe positions outside India, as driven by the far-right political agenda of Hindutva ideology.

Zydenbos has written the first comprehensive Western history of Kannada literature and translated Kannada literature into both German and English. He also translated Dvaita, Virasaiva, and Jain writings from Sanskrit.

Zydenbos was born in Toronto, Ontario, Canada, and has lived in Mysore, India for 17 years.

== Books ==
- A Manual of Modern Kannada (2020)
- Mokṣa in Jainism, according to Umāsvāti (Steiner, 1983)
- The Calf Became an Orphan: A Study in Contemporary Kannada Fiction (Institut Français de Pondichéry, 1996)
- Jainism Today and Its Future (Manya, 2006)
