= Nyasa (ritual) =

Hindu ritual

Nyasa (English: placing; literally, "deposit" or "setting down") is a concept in Hinduism. It involves touching various parts of the body while chanting specific portions of a mantra. This imposition of mantras upon the body is considered as the assigning or locating of divinity inside one's own body. For example, nyasa is part of the equipment of a sculptor as a sādhaka and yogi.

Each mantra is associated with a specific nyasa. There are various types of nyasas, the most important of them being kara nyasa and anga nyasa.

The number seven is commonly written before nyasa mantras in ritual handbooks, indicating that the seven bijaksaras (sacred letters) should be recited before the mantra.

Srividya followers practice matruka nyasa.

The word vinyasa commonly used in yoga practice stems from the word "nyasa" meaning "to place" and the word "vi" meaning "in a special way."

The Ahirbudhnya Samhita describes nyasa as a devotional act of taking refuge.
